= Dietrich und Wenezlan =

Dietrich und Wenezlan (Dietrich and Wenezlan) is a fragmentary Middle High German poem about the legendary hero Dietrich von Bern, the counterpart of the historical Ostrogothic king Theodoric the Great in Germanic heroic legend. It usually considered part of the so-called "historical" Dietrich material, as it appears to cite Dietrich's exile at the court of Etzel described in the "historical poems" Dietrichs Flucht and the Rabenschlacht. The fragment of about 500 lines tells of Dietrich's challenge by Wenezlan of Poland, who has captured one of Dietrich's warriors. It is unclear whether the fragment was the main focus of a poem or a single episode from a longer poem.

== Summary ==
Dietrich und Wenezlan has only survived in a single, incomplete and fragmentary version of about 499 rhyming couplets. Dietrich is at the court of Etzel, when Wolfhart, who, along with Hildebrand, has been captured by Wenezlan, arrives to tell him that Wenezlan wants to engage Dietrich in single combat – if Dietrich wins, then Wenezlan will release Wolfhart and Hildebrand. Initially, Dietrich seems reluctant, but when Wolfhart grows angry and accuses Dietrich of cowardice, saying that if Dietrich refuses Wenezlan will attack Etzel with an army, Dietrich says he had been joking and of course would fight to free his vassals. There is then a lacuna. The combat between Dietrich and Wenezlan begins in between their two armies and in the company of courtly ladies. When they have dehorsed each other, they fight on foot all day. The fragment ends before a conclusion is reached.

== Manuscript transmission and dating ==
Dietrich und Wenezlan is transmitted in a single manuscript fragment of two leaves:

- Öffentliche Bibliothek der Universität Basel, Cod. N I 1 Nr. 67, parchment, north-eastern Bavarian dialect, around 1250.

The text itself may have been written around the same time as the manuscript. Alternatively it may have been written earlier. Due to stylistic influence from Wolfram von Eschenbach (died c. 1220), it cannot have been written earlier than 1220. It appears to predate the other historical poems in the Dietrich cycle by at least a decade.

== Genre ==
Dietrich und Wenezlan is one of the few Dietrich poems written in rhyming couplets. The poem only loosely fits into the category of "historical Dietrich poems," although it clearly takes place within the exile situation described in Dietrichs Flucht and the Rabenschlacht. Victor Millet challenges this classification as uncertain on the grounds that the poem is too fragmentary. The challenge to single combat is more reminiscent of the fantastical poems. Dietrich's initial refusal to fight and the accusation of cowardice (zagheit) also has more in common with the fantastical poems, where this is a frequent occurrence. His admission that he was merely playing a joke may be a game played by the author. Wenezlan challenges Dietrich to combat by the honor of all women, another aspect more reminiscent of the fantastical poems and courtly romance. Elisabeth Lienert thus describes Dietrich und Wenezlan as between the two groups of Dietrich poems: at the same time the poem offers an alternative to the sort of fighting found in poems such as Dietrichs Flucht in that it is fairly and chivalrous.

== Relation to the oral tradition ==
Wenezlan von Bôlân (Poland) is possibly inspired by Wenceslaus I of Bohemia. However, Wenezlan is king of Poland and his warriors are actually Riuzen (Russians), something that weakens the connection to Wenceslaus. The name Wenezlan is also similar to Witzlân of Bohemia, an enemy of Etzel's in Biterolf und Dietleib. Gerhard Eis argued that the source for the poem is a Low German oral tale about Dietrich's battles against the Slavs, basing his theory on the presence of such battles in the Thidrekssaga, some of which show parallels to Wolfhard's captivity, and the mentioning of battles against Russians and Wilzen in a poem by Der Marner. Although Joachim Heinzle finds this suggestion unlikely, Victor Millet finds it plausible.

== Editions ==
- Wackernagel, Wilhelm (1836). "Bruchstück eines unbekannten Gedichtes aus der Dietrichssage". Altdeutsche Blätter. 1: 329–342.
- Zupitza, Julius, ed. (1870). "Bruchstücke von Dietrich und Wenezlan". Das Heldenbuch, fünfter Teil: Dietrichs Abenteuer von Albrecht von Kemenaten nebst den Bruchstücken von Dietrich und Wenezlan. Berlin: Weidmann. pp. 267-274.
- Lienert, Elisabeth; Meyer, Viola, eds. (2007). Alpharts Tod; Dietrich und Wenezlan. Tübingen: Niemeyer. ISBN 9783484645035.
