= Thibert =

Thibert is a French surname. Notable people with the surname include:

- Art Thibert, American comic book artist
- Colin Thibert (born 1951), Swiss writer and screenwriter
- Marie-Élaine Thibert (born 1982), Canadian singer

== See also ==
- Theudebert
