= Dietrichs Flucht =

13th-century German poem

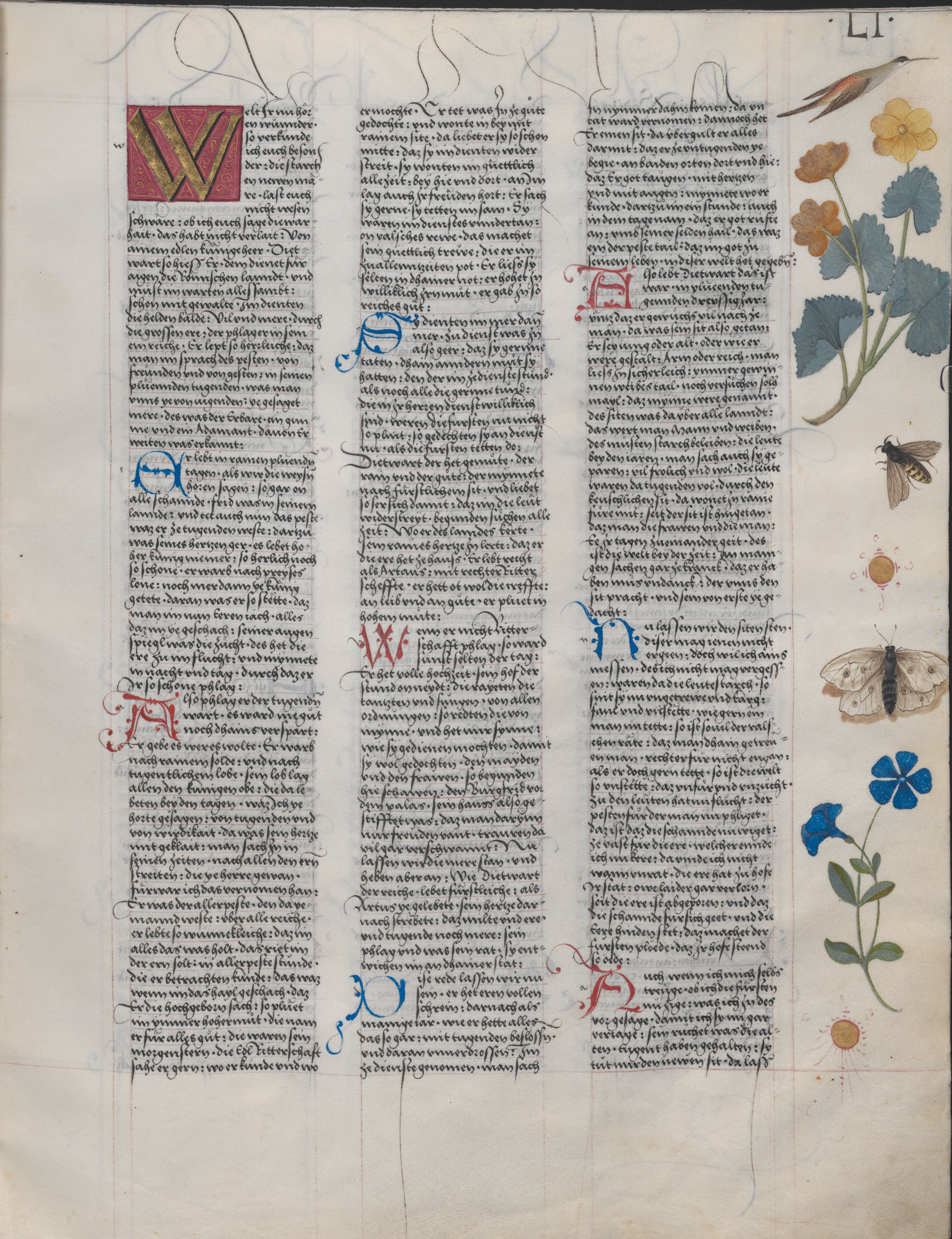
Page from the Ambraser Heldenbuch. Fol. 51r. The large initial marks the start of Dietrichs Flucht.

Dietrichs Flucht (Dietrich's Flight) or Das Buch von Bern (The Book of Verona) is an anonymous 13th-century Middle High German poem about the legendary hero Dietrich von Bern, the legendary counterpart of the historical Ostrogothic king Theodoric the Great in Germanic heroic legend. It is part of the so-called "historical" Dietrich material and is closely related to, and always transmitted together with a second Dietrich poem, the Rabenschlacht. A Heinrich der Vogler is named as author in an excursus of the poem. Earlier scholarship considered him to be the author of Dietrichs Flucht and possibly also of the Rabenschlacht, however more recent scholarship believes he is only author of this excursus.

Dietrichs Flucht describes the rule of Dietrich's ancestors in his kingdom in northern Italy; his betrayal and exile by his wicked uncle Ermenrich, and his flight to the Huns, where he is warmly received by Etzel and his wife Helche. With Etzel's help, Dietrich makes two attempts to reclaim his kingdom from Ermenrich, but each time his victory is pyrrhic and he is forced to return to exile with the Huns.

Unlike most German heroic poems, the poem is written in rhyming couplets, suggesting that it may have been intended to be read as a historical document like a rhymed chronicle. Alternatively, the choice of couplets may suggest a nearness to the genre of chivalric romance. The poem unites figures from various German heroic traditions, including the Nibelungenlied, Wolfdietrich, and Ortnit.

== Summary ==
Dietrichs Flucht begins with a long history of Dietrich's ancestors, who all live exceptionally long, Methuselan and virtuous lives and leave a single heir to the kingdom. They are native to Italy (called Lomparten or Rœmischlant) and spend their lives acquiring brides and fighting dragons. This easy line of inheritance is broken first by Ortnit, who is killed by a dragon, but the succession is restored by Wolfdietrich, who marries Ortnit's widow and becomes king. Wolfdietrich has 56 children, but all die except for Hugdietrich. Hugdietrich's son Amelung, has three sons: Ermenrich, Dietmar, and Diether. When Hugdietrich dies, he divides the country among his children, Dietmar receiving Bern (Verona). Ermenrich is the father of Friderich, Dietmar of Dietrich and Diether (II), and Diether of the two Harlungen.

Dietmar places his children into Ermenrich's care when he dies, however, Ermenrich proves treacherous. First he murders the two Harlungen and takes over their country, failing to capture their regent Eckehart, then invites Dietrich to visit him in order to murder him as well. Ermenrich's messenger warns Dietrich, however, and so Ermenrich is forced to invade with an army. Dietrich defeats Ermenrich decisively in battle at Milan, capturing Ermenrich's son Friderich. He is left without any money to reward his soldiers, so he sends a group of vassals to fetch some. This group falls into an ambush by Witege, a former vassal of Dietrich's who switched sides. This results in the capture of Dietrich's best warriors, among them Hildebrand and Wolfhart. Ermenrich refuses Dietrich's offer to exchange Friderich for the prisoners and says he will only release Dietrich's men if the latter leaves the country, which, against the advice of his remaining warriors, Dietrich chooses to do. All the inhabitants of Bern leave the city, including women and children.

Dietrich goes into exile with 50 warriors, making his way to the court of Etzel, King of the Huns, at Gran. There with the help of Rüdiger and Etzel's wife Helche, Dietrich receives Etzel's support to return to Italy. Dietrich's vassal Amelolt comes to Etzel's court at this time and announces he was able to recapture Bern. Dietrich sets out immediately with the Hunnish army and his remaining warriors, followed by a large army commanded by Rüdiger. They defeat Ermenrich once again in battle at Milan, and Ermenrich fleas to Ravenna, where Dietrich besieges him. Ermenrich is able to slip out of the city to Bologna, however. Ermenrich ransoms his captured men, except for Witige, whom Dietrich refuses to release due to his treachery. On the advice of his vassals and Rüdiger, however, Dietrich forgives Witige, makes him governor of Ravenna, and gives him the horse Schemming as a gift. Dietrich then heads back to Etzel's residence at Etzelburg. Etzel and Helche suggest that Dietrich marry Helche's niece and lady-in-waiting Herrat, which Dietrich initially refuses. Hildebrand and Rüdiger eventually convince him to accept the offer.

Now Eckehart arrives and tells Dietrich that Witege has betrayed him, handing Ravenna over to Ermenrich who has killed all the inhabitants. Dietrich despairs, but Etzel is enraged and puts together a large army, which marches and defeats Ermenrich outside Bologna. Ermenrich flees into the city, but Dietrich's victory is Pyrrhic, as he has lost many good warriors. Dietrich is particularly saddened by the death of Wolfhart's brother Alphart. He is forced to return to Etzel.

== Dating, creation, and transmission ==
Dietrichs Flucht is transmitted together with tee Rabenschlacht in four complete manuscripts and alone in one fragmentary manuscript:

- Riedegger Manuscript (R), Staatsbibliothek Berlin, Ms. germ 2^{o} 1062, on parchment from the end of the thirteenth century, from Niederösterreich. Contains various literary texts.
- Windhager Manuscript (W), Österreichische Nationalbibliothek Vienna, Cod. 2779, parchment, first quarter of the fourteenth century, from Niederösterreich. Contains various literary texts and the Kaiserchronik.
- (P) Universitätsbibliothek Heidelberg, Cpg 314, paper, 1443/47, from Augsburg. Contains various literary texts.
- Ambraser Heldenbuch (A), Österreichische Nationalbibliothek Vienna, Cod. Series Nova 2663, parchment, 1504/1515, from Tyrol. Various literary texts.
- (K) Universitätsbibliothek Innsbruck, B III, parchment, in Austro-Bavarian dialect, beginning of fourteenth century. Contains a fragment of Dietrichs Flucht.

Excerpts from Dietrichs Flucht are also transmitted in some manuscripts of the World Chronicle of Heinrich von München.

The origins of the earliest manuscripts as well as the dialect of the poem indicate that it was composed in Austria, sometime before 1300. Given several allusions to the ways that the dukes of Austria are reducing the rights of their vassals, the poem is typically dated to after the beginning of the rule of the Habsburgs in Austria in 1282. Alternatively, this may simply provide a date for when the poem was reworked by the author of these portions, Heinrich der Vogler (see below).

== Genre and interpretation ==
Dietrichs Flucht is about 10000 lines long. The poem is unusual in that it is written in rhyming couplets rather than in stanzas, as is the case with most German heroic epics. It may indicate that the author was trying to make his work more similar to either courtly romance, or, more probably to a rhyming chronicle. With a single exception near the beginning, the narrator is absolutely insistent about the veracity of his story, repeating over and over again that what he is telling is true. His claims of both written and oral sources might serve to convince his audience that he is narrating historical truth while still providing the poem with the authority of the oral tradition. The poem also features a realistic geography of Northern Italy, with Norbert Voorwinden noting that the poem contains more Italian place names than any other medieval German source. He concludes that all of this indicates the work intends to imitate a chronicle. These claims appear to have been taken seriously, as the World Chronicle of Heinrich von München describes the life of the historical Theoderic according to Dietrichs Flucht.

At the same time, the poem seeks to create something like a complete tale of the heroic world, including figures from Wolfdietrich, Ortnit, and the Nibelungenlied in Dietrich's genealogy. Moreover, Siegfried, Gunther, and Gernot all appear as figures in the poem. The opening lines of the poem also take their inspiration from the Nibelungenlied, but the opening of Dietrichs Flucht instead proclaims that it will tell newe maeren (new tales) rather than the alte maeren of the Nibelungenlied. Dietrich's repeated failed attempts to reclaim his homeland and his proclamations that he is armer Dieterich (poor Dietrich) may also derive from Dietrich's monologue in the Nibelungenlied upon losing his men. At the same time, the poem excludes any references to any tales found in the fantastical Dietrich poems. Heinzle suggests that these poems may not have seemed historical to the author. Several of Dietrich's ancestors nevertheless fight against dragons—the only time this occurs in the historical Dietrich poems.

Stylistically, the poem is notable for its portrayal of escalating violence: each battle that Dietrich fights is bloodier and deadlier than the last. The battle scenes are described in drastic terms, as the heroes literally wade in blood. Despite its drastic portrayal of warfare, the poem does not seem to criticize violence or warfare; while leaving little room for the heroic warrior ethos in the traditional sense, it nonetheless portrays battle as a tool that a ruler must use. Thematically, the poem largely deals with the topic of loyalty, especially between vassal and lord, with Dietrich and Etzel representing fealty, while Ermenrich, his deceitful advisor Sibeche, and the treacherous Witige represent disloyalty. Ermenrich appears to bring a sort of fall from grace and is described as the first figure to bring evil into the world. Dietrich is nevertheless unable to defeat him, showing that evil cannot be removed from the world. The long list of Dietrich's ancestors serves to legitimate his rule in Italy.

Lienert notes that, although the poem clearly supports Dietrich over Ermenrich, it nevertheless questions some of his decisions. For instance, Dietrich decides to go into exile to save the men Ermenrich had captured against the advice of his vassals. His pardon of Witege, while advised by his vassals, far exceeds their advice by appointing Witege governor of Ravenna in his absence.

== Authorship and relationship to the Rabenschlacht ==
A certain Heinrich der Vogler names himself as author in an excursus against princely caprice in the middle of Dietrichs Flucht. He is not attested elsewhere and may have been a wandering poet or minstrel. His authorship is now generally discounted, as it he is not named at the beginning or end of the text. Victor Millet notes, furthermore, that the excursus has some stylistic characteristics otherwise absent in the romance. Heinzle suggests that it is still possible that Heinrich is the author of Dietrichs Flucht, but finds it more likely that he merely wrote the excursus where he is named. Werner Hoffmann believes that Heinrich reworked and expanded a pre-existing poem and connected it with the Rabenschlacht. Hoffmann is highly critical of what he believes is Heinrich's work, pointing to numerous inconsistencies within Dietrichs Flucht (e.g. the hero Alphart dies twice) and between Dietrichs Flucht and Rabenschlacht. Sebastian Coxon argues that Heinrich's naming himself is a strategy to grant authorial authority to the excursus, in the same way as the poem's frequent recourse to oral and fictionalized written sources for its narrative. The excursus appears to describe the situation in Austria at the time of the poem's composition.

Early scholarship believed that both Dietrichs Fluch and the Rabenschlacht had a single author; however, the formal and stylistic differences between the two epics have caused this theory to be abandoned. The manuscript transmission nevertheless makes clear that the Rabenschlacht and Dietrichs Flucht were viewed as a single work by contemporaries. Most scholarship holds the Rabenschlacht to be the older of the two poems, providing a model for the third battle and end of Dietrichs Flucht, though Millet questions this interpretation. It is clear, at any rate, that both works were deliberate brought together and adapted to be transmitted together, possibly by Heinrich der Vogler.

== Relation to the oral tradition ==
Unlike for the supposedly older Rabenschlacht, the connection between Dietrichs Flucht and the oral tradition is disputed. Some debate exists over whether the oral tradition merely contained Dietrich's exile prior to the events of the Rabenschlacht, or whether or not tales of at least one failed attempt to return prior to the events of that poem existed. Dietrichs Flucht is sometimes seen as a stringing together of the same episode (Dietrich's failed return from exile) by the poet in order to expand his material. The scholar Norbert Voorwinden has suggested that the entire poem is the invention of an author inspired by the Italian campaigns of Emperor Frederick II.

== Editions ==
- von der Hagen, Friedrich Heinrich; Primisser, Anton, eds. (1825). "Dietrichs Ahnen und Flucht zu den Heunen. Aus der Heidelberger und Wiener Handschrift". Der Helden Buch in der Ursprache herausgegeben. Vol. 2. Berlin: Reimer. pp. 1–104.
- Martin, Ernest, ed. (1866). "Dietrichs Flucht". Deutsches Heldenbuch. Vol. 2. Berlin: Weidmann. pp. 55–215.
- Lienert, Elisabeth; Beck, Gertrud, eds. (2003). Dietrichs Flucht: textgeschichtliche Ausgabe. Tübingen: Niemeyer. ISBN 3484645016.
