= Heinz Ritter-Schaumburg =

German author (1902–1994)

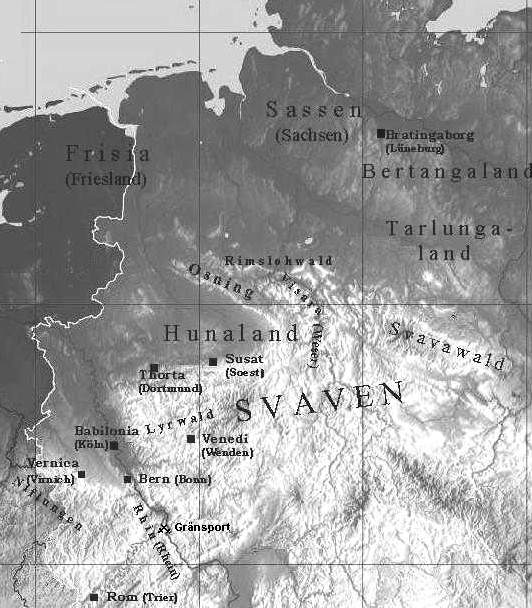
The places of the Thidrekssaga according to Heinz Ritter-Schaumburg

Heinz Ritter-Schaumburg (born 3 June 1902 in Greifswald as Heinrich Adolf Ritter; died 22 June 1994 in Schaumburg) was a German scholar and writer, who developed a hypothesis about the origin of the legends about Dietrich von Bern and the Nibelungs. He postulated that Dietrich von Bern was a historic king ruling in Bonn in Germany, who was later confused with Theodoric the Great. Similarly he proposed that the legendary Etzel (also Atilla, Atli or Atala) was a historic king residing in Soest, who was later confused with Attila the Hun. His hypothesis was either ignored or rejected by most scholars in the field, but gained a relatively large amount of attention in public since 1975.

== Life ==
Heinz Ritter grew up in Greifswald as a child, later in Posen and in Düsseldorf in Germany. He studied medicine, German studies, Hispanism and Biology, spoke seven languages and gained a PhD "Dr. phil." in German studies. He was teacher at a school at Hanover until it was closed in 1936. Thereafter he founded a residential child care community in Schaumburg, which he led until 1967.

Heinz Ritter is author of a number of books with a total edition over 100,000. His most famous book was Die Nibelungen zogen nordwärts, 1981. With it he proposed that the Thidrekssaga is the most basal form of the Germanic heroic legends. Based on that he also proposed that Dietrich von Bern was now an unknown king ruling over Bonn at around 500 AD.

== Hypothesis about the Germanic heroic legends ==
Despite sharing few similarities, the legendary Dietrich von Bern and the historic Theodoric the Great were treated as the same figure since the Middle Ages. The differences between both are usually explained by motifs of oral tradition. In contrast to that, Heinz Ritter-Schaumburg postulated that the Thidrekssaga is the most ancient form of the Germanic heroic legends, and that it tells from historic events of late 5th and early 6th century in northern Germany. According to his concept, those parts of the legends, which are clearly related to Theodoric the Great and Italy, are later changes in the wrong believe that Theodoric the Great and Dietrich von Bern would be the same figure.

Ritter postulates that Dietrich von Bern was originally not based on Theodoric the Great, but instead reflects the live of another nowadays unknown king who ruled at around 500 A.D. over Bonn and the neighboring area. He points out that Bonn has reportedly been called Bern during the Early and High Middle Ages. According to the Thidrekssaga, Dietrich is driven to exile by his uncle Ermenrik residing in Rome. Dietrich seeks refuge in Susat, the capital in the kingdom called Hunaland. The king of this Hunaland is called Attala, Attila, Atilius or Aktilius in the Thidrekssaga and the Swedish Didrikssagan. The figure Ermenrik is traditionally believed to originate in the Gothic king Ermanaric, who died in 376, while Attala is believed to originate in the Hunnic ruler Attila, who died in 453. Since both persons were not contemporaries of Theodoric the Great in reality, it is generally accepted that the legends about Dietrich von Bern have been transformed in such a way that both lack any historical correctness. Ritter however postulates that Attala of the Thidrekssaga was a nowadays unknown king ruling about the Hunaland at its capital Soest in Germany. Ritter also believes that Rome in the Thidrekssaga is not Rome in Italy, but the post-RomanTrier which was the largest city north of the Alps in the Late antiquity of High Roman culture and known as Roma secunda.

Ritter further postulated that the legendary Nibelungs (called Niflungs in the Thidrekssaga) came from the area of the Neffel, a little river in western Germany. According to the Thidrekssaga, the Nibelungs crossed the Rhine on their way to Susat, "where Rhine and Duna come together". This sentence of the legend was traditionally believed to reflect just the bad geographic knowledge of the writers, since it was assumed that the Duna of the Thidrekssaga must be the Danube. Since it is known, however, that the Danube is not a tributary of the Rhine, Ritter pointed out that there is indeed a little river called Dhünn, documented as the Dune in the Middle Ages. This watercourse was once a tributary of the Rhine and later redirected into the Wupper which also flows into the Rhine. Thus Ritter proposes that the Duna of the legend is the Dhünn.

== Selected works ==
Germanistik

Studies about Novalis:
- Die Datierung der ‹Hymnen an die Nacht›. In: Euphorion 52, C. Winter, Heidelberg 1958, ISSN 0012-0936, pp. 114–141.
- Die Geistlichen Lieder des Novalis. Ihre Datierung und Entstehung. In: Jahrbuch der Deutschen Schiller-Gesellschaft 4, Wallstein, Göttingen 1960, ISSN 0070-4318, pp. 308–342.
- Das Azzo-Fragment. Eine unbekannte Novalis-Handschrift. In: Deutsche Vierteljahrsschrift für Literaturwissenschaft und Geistesgeschichte 34, Metzler, Stuttgart 1960, ISSN 0012-0936, pp. 378–383.
- Die Entstehung des Heinrich von Ofterdingen. In: Euphorion 55, C. Winter, Heidelberg 1961, ISSN 0014-2328, pp. 163–195.
- Der unbekannte Novalis. Sachse & Pohl, Göttingen 1967.
- Novalis' Hymnen an die Nacht. Ihre Deutung nach Inhalt und Aufbau auf textkritischer Grundlage. 2nd substantially expanded edition with the facsimile of the hymn manuscript, C. Winter, Heidelberg 1974, ISBN 3-533-02348-6 und ISBN 3-533-02349-4.
- Novalis: Schriften. Die Werke Friedrich von Hardenbergs. Ed. Heinz Ritter and Gerhard Schulz, 3rd supplemented and expanded edition, Kohlhammer, Stuttgart 1977, ISBN 978-3-17-001299-8.
- Novalis und seine erste Braut. Urachhaus, Stuttgart 1986, ISBN 3-87838-480-7.
- Novalis vu par ses contemporains. Karl von Hardenberg. Trad. de l’allemand par Vincent Choisnel. Préf. de Paul-Henri Bideau. Postface de Heinz Ritter, Ed. Novalis, Montesson 1994, ISBN 2-910112-08-X.

German studies
- Dietrich von Bern – König zu Bonn. Herbig, München 1982, ISBN 3-7766-1227-4.
- Die Thidrekssaga oder Didrik von Bern und die Niflungen. In der Übersetzung von Friedrich von der Hagen. Völlig neu bearb. Aufl. der 2. Ausgabe Breslau 1855. Hrsg. und mit geographischen Anmerkungen versehen von Heinz Ritter, Reichl, St. Goar 1990, ISBN 978-3-87667-101-7.
- Sigfrid – ohne Tarnkappe. Herbig, München 1990, ISBN 978-3-7766-1652-1.
- Die Didriks-Chronik oder die Svava. Das Leben König Didriks von Bern und die Niflungen. Erstmals vollständig aus der altschwedischen Handschrift der Thidrekssaga übersetzt und mit geographischen Anmerkungen versehen, 2. unveränderte Auflage, Reichl, St. Goar 1991, ISBN 3-87667-102-7.
- Die Nibelungen zogen nordwärts. 6th unchanged edition, Herbig, München 1992, ISBN 3-7766-1155-3.
- Die Nibelungen zogen nordwärts. Paperback edition with index, 8th unchanged edition, Reichl, St. Goar 2002, ISBN 3-87667-129-9.
- Der Schmied Weland. Olms, Hildesheim 1999, ISBN 3-487-11015-6.

Language
- Die Kraft der Sprache. Von der Bedeutung der Vokale und Konsonanten in der Sprache. Herbig, München 1985, ISBN 3-7766-1287-8.
- Ursprache lebt. Reichl, 2nd unchanged edition, St. Goar 1999, ISBN 3-87667-207-4.

Early history of the first century:

- Der Cherusker. Arminius im Kampf mit der römischen Weltmacht. Herbig Verlag, München/Berlin 1988, ISBN 3-7766-1544-3; new edition with identical contents under the title: Hermann der Cherusker. Die Schlacht im Teutoburger Wald und ihre Folgen für die Weltgeschichte. VMA-Verlag, Wiesbaden 2008, ISBN 978-3-928127-99-8.

Poetry

Erzählende Dichtung:
- Welche Kraft war es? dipa, Frankfurt a. M. 1972, ISBN 3-7638-0900-7.
- Der Traum vom Gralsfelsen. Erzählungen und Gedanken, Ogham, Stuttgart 1982, ISBN 3-88455-853-6.
- Mit Lied und Laute durch Spanien. Jahn & Ernst, Hamburg 1993, ISBN 3-89407-067-6.

Epic poetry:
- Das Erdeneiland. Reichl, St. Goar 1990, ISBN 3-87667-130-2.

Poetry for children:
- Die schönsten Sagen. 2nd edition (21–28k), Bertelsmann, Gütersloh o. J. (1960).
- Die goldene Kugel. Singspiel, Möseler, Wolfenbüttel/Zürich 1966.
- Sagen der Völker. 5th unchanged edition, Freies Geistesleben, Stuttgart 1987, ISBN 3-7725-0664-X.

Poems:
- Der goldene Wagen. Bösendahl, Rinteln 1953.
- Wachsende Ringe, Gedichte meines Lebens. Reichl, St. Goar 1995, ISBN 3-87667-205-8.
- Sehnen und Streben. Gedichte meiner Wanderzeit, Manufactur, Horn 1984, ISBN 3-88080-061-8.
- Der Pfeiffer von Hameln. Mit Illustrationen von Christiane Lesch, Ogham, Stuttgart o. J. (1986), ISBN 3-88455-153-1.
- Eins und Alles. Gedichte für Kindheit und Jugend. 12th unchanged edition, Freies Geistesleben, Stuttgart 2009, ISBN 978-3-7725-2373-1.
- Liebe Erde. Gedichte und Sprüche. 5th expanded edition, Ogham, Stuttgart 1982, ISBN 3-88455-006-3.
- Das Maulwurfs-Igelchen. Ogham, Stuttgart 1989-2, ISBN 3-88455-037-3.
- Die Kunterbunte Dichterwerkstatt. edition fischer, Frankfurt a. M. 1993, ISBN 3-89406-809-4.

Others:

- Die Jahreszeiten in Liedern. Initialmalerei von Adolph B. G. Ritter, Ed. Heinz Ritter, Reichl, St. Goar o. J. (1993), ISBN 978-3-87667-228-1.

== Bibliography ==
- Gunnar Olof Hyltén-Cavallius (Ed.): Sagan om Didrik af Bern (Samlingar utg. af Svenska Fornskrift-sällskapet, issue 14, 15, 22, = vol. 10). Stockholm 1850.
- Hinrich Jantz: Heinz Ritter. Arbeitskreis für deutsche Dichtung, Niederems 1963.
- Fritz Raeck: Pommersche Literatur. Proben und Daten. Pommerscher Zentralverband, Hamburg 1969, p. 351.
- "SAGEN: Etzels Ende". Der Spiegel. No. 40. 1975. pp. 222–225.
- Walter Böckmann: Der Nibelungen Tod in Soest. Neue Erkenntnisse zur historischen Wahrheit. Econ Verlag, Düsseldorf u.a. 1981, ISBN 3-430-11378-4.
- Kürschners Deutscher Gelehrten-Kalender, München 1983.
- Heinz Ritter: Zu Andreas Heeges "Neue Märchen über Alte – Nibelungen". In: Soester Zeitschrift Nr. 97 (1985), ISSN 0176-3946, pp. 26–28.
- Gernot Müller: Allerneueste Nibelungische Ketzereien. Zu Heinz Ritter-Schaumburgs "Die Nibelungen zogen nordwärts". In: Studia Neophilologica 57 (1985), pp. 105–116; cf. Ritter’s response.
- Heinz Ritter: Die Bergen-Hypothese und die Thidrekssaga. Eine Stellungnahme zum Aufsatz von J. Janota und J. Kühnel. In: Soester Zeitschrift Nr. 98 (1986), ISSN 0176-3946, pp. 150–154.
- Roswitha Wisniewski: Mittelalterliche Dietrichdichtung. Metzler, Stuttgart 1986, ISBN 3-476-10205-X (Sammlung Metzler 205).
- Kürschners Deutscher Literatur-Kalender. de Gruyter, Berlin/New York 1988, ISBN 3-11-010901-8.
- Heinz Ritter-Schaumburg: Die Didriks-Chronik (German translation of the Old Swedish version of the Thidrekssaga by Ritter-Schaumburg). Otto Reichl Verlag, St. Goar 1989, ISBN 3-87667-102-7.
- Hans Rudolf Hartung: Thidreksaga vor Nibelungenlied. In: Soester Anzeiger, 5. März 1991.
- Hans den Besten: Bemerkungen zu einer Kritik Johannes Jonatas u. a. zu Ritter-Schaumburgs „Die Nibelungen zogen nordwärts“. In: Amsterdamer Beiträge zur älteren Germanistik 33, 1991, ISSN 0165-7305, pp. 117–130.
- Renate Klink: Was uns die Sagen sagen. In: Feuilleton, Hannoversche Allgemeine Zeitung, 3. Juni 1992.
- Der Streit um die Frühzeit von Soest. Soester-Anzeiger, 25. Mai 1993.
- Heinrich Beck: Zur Thidrekssaga-Diskussion. In: Zeitschrift für deutsche Philologie 112, 1993, ISSN 1865-2018, pp. 441–448.
- Hans Rudolf Hartung: Soest in der Sage. Eine Anzeiger-Serie. Griebsch, Hamm 1994, ISBN 3-924966-04-4.
- Heinz Ritter – Querdenker auf den Spuren der Nibelungen. In: Schaumburger Zeitung, 25. Juni 1994.
- Reinhard Schmoeckel: Deutsche Sagenhelden und historische Wirklichkeit. Zwei Jahrhunderte deutscher Frühgeschichte neu gesehen. Georg Olms Verlag, Hildesheim/Zürich/New York 1995, ISBN 3-487-10035-5.
- Peter-Paul Koch: De Thidrekssaga. Waarheid in oude verhalen? In: Tijdschrift voor Geschiedenis 110 (1997), ISSN 0040-7518, pp. 423–442.
- Heinz Ritter-Schaumburg: Die Nibelungen zogen nordwärts. 2. Auflage. Reichl-Verlag Der Leuchter, St. Goar 2002, ISBN 3-87667-129-9.
- Hermann Reichert: Die Nibelungensage im mittelalterlichen Skandinavien. In: Joachim Heinzle, Klaus Klein, Ute Obhof (Hrsg.): Die Nibelungen. Sage – Epos – Mythos. Reichert, Wiesbaden 2003, ISBN 3-89500-347-6, pp. 29–88.
- Reinhard Schmoeckel: Bevor es Deutschland gab. Expedition in unsere Frühgeschichte – von den Römern bis zu den Sachsenkaisern. 4. Auflage. Bastei Lübbe, Bergisch Gladbach 2004, ISBN 3-404-64188-4 (Bastei Lübbe 64188).
- Harry Böseke: Sagenhafte Irrtümer. Ah!-Erlebnis-Verlag Frank Ahlert, Mönchengladbach 2006, ISBN 3-9811054-0-0.
- Martin Huber: Saat der Rache – Die Chronik der Niflungen. Neopubli GmbH, Berlin 2017, ISBN 978-3-7450-9702-3.
