= Wolfdietrich =

Protagonist of the heroic epic Wolfdietrich

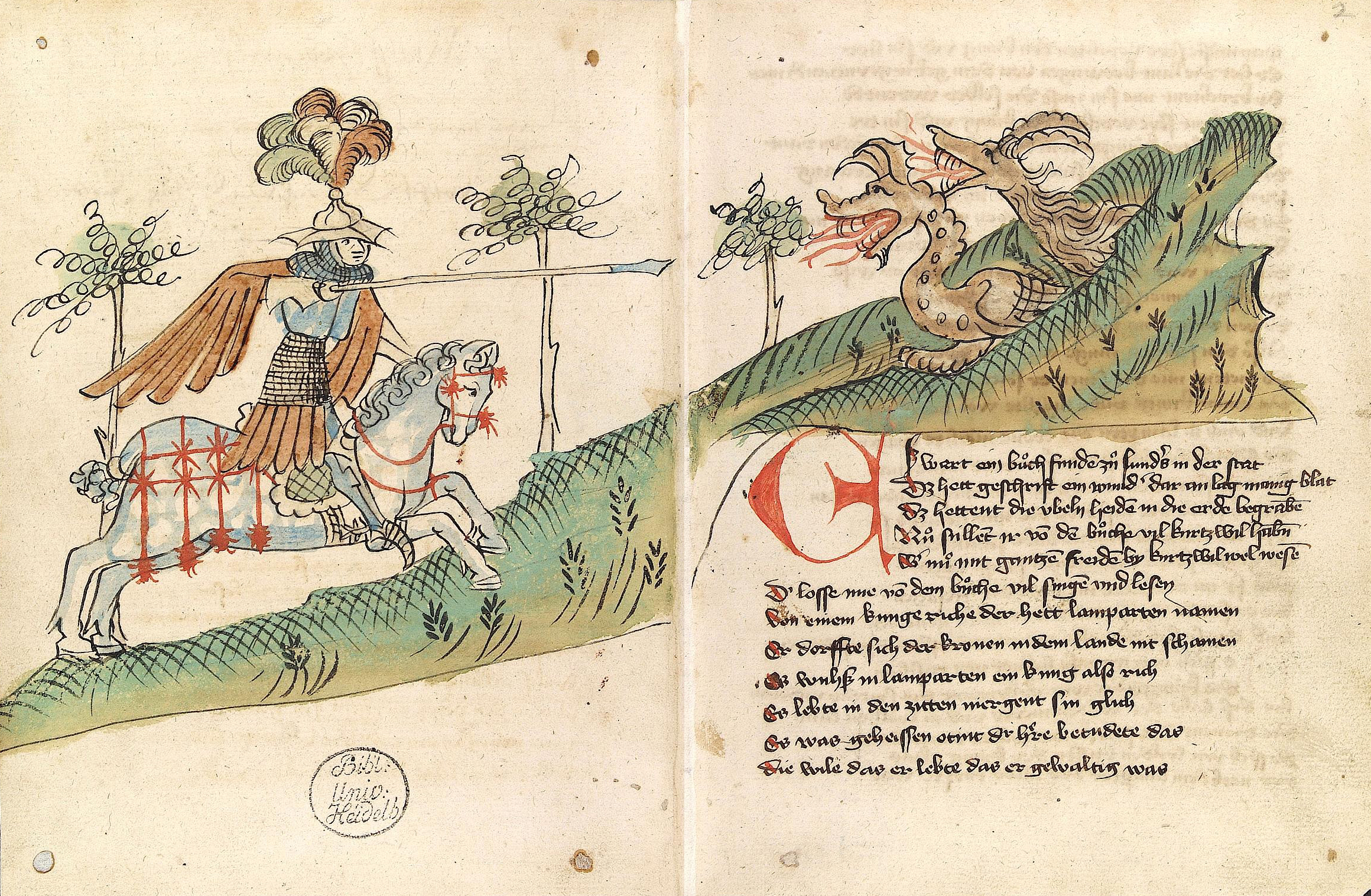
Wolfdietrich attacking the dragons. From Heidelberg, Universitätsbiblothek, Cpg 365, folios 1v and 2r.

Wolfdietrich is the eponymous protagonist of the Middle High German heroic epic Wolfdietrich. First written down in strophic form in around 1230 by an anonymous author, it survives in four main versions, widely differing in scope and content, and largely independent of each other.

Wolfdietrich is closely associated with another heroic epic poem of the same period, Ortnit. The two stories have distinct (if disputed) origins but they were combined at an early stage, possibly by a single author, and appear together in most sources. In the earliest surviving version of the first story, Ortnit is killed by two dragons sent by his father-in-law after he abducts and marries his daughter; in the second, Wolfdietrich, deprived of his inheritance by two brothers and an evil counsellor, sets out to seek Ortnit's help but, finding he has been killed, avenges him by killing the dragons, he then defeats his brothers and the counsellor, and marries Ortnit's widow.

While the earliest version is similar to other heroic epics such as the Nibelungenlied, the tale gradually accretes more episodes, becoming a popular adventure story.

With their motifs of the bride-quest, inheritance regained, faithful and faithless vassals, dragon-killing, magic suits of armour, and encounters with dwarves, witches and giants, this pair of stories remained continuously popular, repeatedly re-cast, copied and, later, printed until the early 17th century. This makes it one of the most long-lived and popular German narratives of the medieval and early modern period.

Though Wolfdietrich and Ortnit do not seem originally to have been among the legends surrounding Theodoric the Great, the Dietrich von Bern cycle, Wolfdietrich became identified as the grandfather of Dietrich, and material from the two stories found its way into a number of Dietrich tales, including the Old Norse Thidreksaga.

== Versions ==
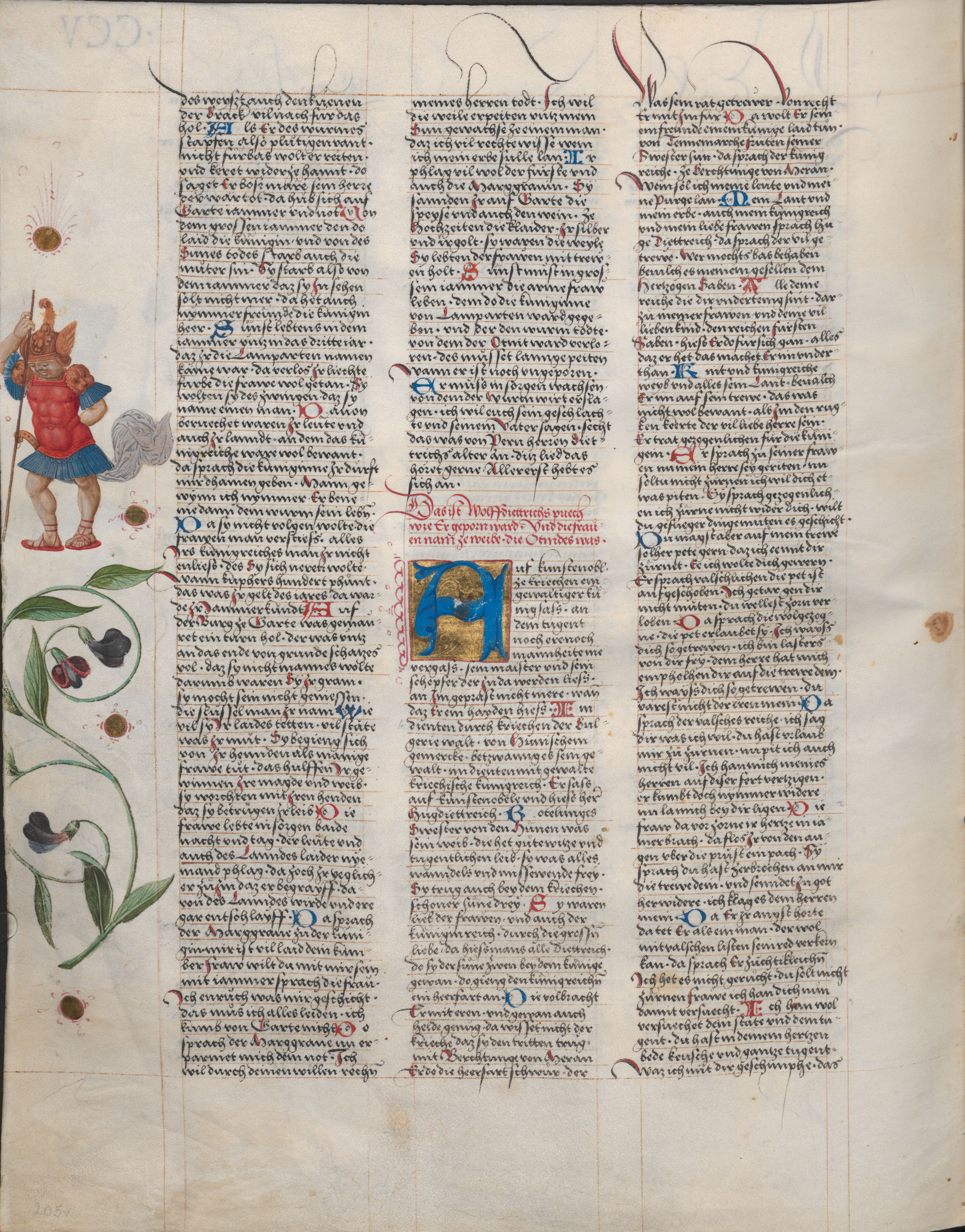
The start of Wolfdietrich A, folio 220^{v} of the Ambraser Heldenbuch

The story survives in four versions. Three of these (A, B, C) are largely independent of each other, and each gives Wolfdietrich a different birthplace. The fourth, D, is a compilation of material from versions B and C.

Wolfdietrich A ("Wolfdietrich of Constantinople") is the oldest version, written around 1230, though only surviving in a much later manuscript, the Ambraser Heldenbuch (MS A). The first 505 strophes (A1) are probably written by the same author as the version of Ortnit which precedes it in the manuscript, but the remaining 101 strophes (A2) show a more condensed narration by a continuator using material from the tradition of Wolfdietrich B. The end of the story is missing in the Ambraser Heldenbuch (it ends as Wolfdieterich's sword breaks in his fight against the dragon), but can be reconstructed from the Dresden Heldenbuch of 1472, which draws on the same source as MS A.

Wolfdietrich B ("Wolfdietrich of Saloniki") greatly expands the story of Wolfdietrich's youth.

Wolfdietrich C ("Wolfdietrich of Athens") survives only in five widely spread fragments, one of which is now missing.

Wolfdietrich D is the most extensive version (hence "The Large Wolfdietrich") and combines material from versions B and C as well as a further, unknown version related to B. With 10 manuscripts and six printed editions it is "one of the great literary successes of the late Middle Ages".

== The story ==
=== Ortnit A ===
King Ortnit of Lambarten (Lombardy) abducts Liebgarte, the daughter of King Machorel. Under the guise of an attempt at reconciliation, Machorel sends Ortnit two dragon eggs, and the dragons terrorise the kingdom after they hatch. After a year Ortnit sets out to defeat the dragons, but is caught asleep and killed by them. His widow is forced into seclusion, to await the birth of Ortnit's avenger.

=== Wolfdietrich A ===
Wolfdietrich is born as third son to Hugdietrich, King of Greece. The king's evil counsellor Sabene persuades him that the child is the spawn of the devil, and Duke Berchtung of Meran is ordered to kill him. But Berchtung saves the child and brings about the banishment of Sabene.

After Hugdietrich's death, Sabene returns to Constantinople and persuades the two elder brothers to banish the queen and deprive Wolfdietrich, now living in Berchtung's castle Lilienport, of his inheritance. Wolfdietrich leads a military campaign against his brothers but it fails and he is besieged in Lilienport. After four years he breaks out and makes his way to seek help from King Ortnit.

He eventually makes his way to Garte, where he finds Ortnit's widow lamenting her husband's death. He defeats the dragons, marries Liebgart, and becomes King of Lambarten.

Disguised as a pilgrim, Wolfdietrich reconnoitres Constantinople, where Berchtung's sons are being held captive by his brothers. After recovering his wife, who had been abducted in the meantime, he sails to Greece, where after a successful siege of his brothers he has Sabene executed and rewards his faithful vassals. He then returns to Lambarten.

After twelve years of marriage, Wolfdietrich moves to a monastery, where devils torment him until his death.

== Origins ==
Various theories have attempted to connect Wolfdietrich (and his father Hugdietrich) with historical persons from the Germanic Migration Period:

- The Ostrogothic theory equates Wolfdietrich with Dietrich von Bern. This is supported by the name Dietrich (Wolfdietrich is a nickname for the child baptized Dietrich), by the Italian and Near East geography, and by the exile and reconquest story. However, given the prominence of the other Dietrich stories, this seems unlikely.
- The Frankish theories identify Wolfdietrich with various Merovingian rulers, Theudebert, Theuderich or Gundoald. Support for this lies in the motif of the conflict between the brothers over the inheritance, and the name Hugdietrich is Frankish. The closest parallels are with Chlodwig I (=Hugdietrich) and his son Theuderich (=Wolfdietrich): the accusation of bastardy, fraternal conflict and a mixed marriage. The conception of Berchtung may be based on Hildebrand, loyal follower of Dietrich von Bern, but also allude to the Frankish ruler type Majordomus. According to Joachim Heinzle, the Wolfdietrich tradition has to be considered as "an independent saga, whose origins are not to be found in Gothic but Frankish history." Elisabeth Lienert regards approaches to recognize the hero Wolfdietrich as saga equivalent to Theodoric the Great as a long obsolete thesis. Roswitha Wisniewski assumes that "the Wolfdietrich apparently points to a very old version of the Dietrichsage, which, however, had to give way to the younger saga versions of the Middle High German epics."

However, there is no consensus on these theories, and it can be argued that the many anti-historical elements essential to the story (rescue by wolves, magic armour, giants, dragons) suggest it combines a variety of legendary and fantastic sources divorced from any specific historical personalities. In this view Wolfdietrich is essentially a montage, which draws on not only the heroic epic, but also the chanson de geste, crusade literature, the bride-quest story, and other sources, with what Miklautsch calls a "hybrid hero".

== Form and structure ==
Wolfdietrich and Ortnit are written in a strophic form called the Hildebrandston (similar to the Nibelungenstrophe used in the Nibelungenlied and Kudrun). It consists of four long-lines: each long-line has three feet with a feminine ending, a caesura, then three feet with a rhymed masculine ending.

Wolfdietrich A
1. Auf Kunstenobl ze Kriechen || ein gewaltiger kuanig sass
an dem tugent noch ere || noch manheite nie vergass
sein maister und sein schepfer || der in da werden liess
an im geprast nicht mere || wann daz er ein hayden hiess.

Translation:

In Constantinople in Greece there ruled a mighty king.
In virtue or honour or manliness he was not left wanting
By his lord and creator, who gave him these qualities
He was lacking in nothing except that he was a heathen.

The strophes are marked in the manuscripts by a Lombardic capital.

In the printed Heldenbücher, the Hildebrandston is transformed into the Heunenweise, an eight-line strophe: the long-line is split at the caesura and unrhymed line-endings are given rhymes, with the resulting rhyme scheme ABABCDCD. This necessarily involved considerable rewriting of the text:

Wolfdietrich D, Strassburger Heldenbuch, 1479
6. Zuo constantinopel für ware
da saß ein künig reich
er was gewaltig zware
der hieß Hugdietereich
auff von kindes jugent
kund der künig wol leben
durh got und durch sein tugent
beide lihen und auch geben

Translation:

In Constantinople it is true
There ruled a wealthy king
He was mighty indeed
His name was Hugdieterich
From his earliest youth
The king lead a good life
Through God and his own virtue
Both giving and receiving.

== Manuscripts and printed books ==
The four versions of Wolfdietrich survive in 11 complete manuscripts and several fragments of a twelfth. In many cases Wolfdietrich (and Ortnit) form part of a larger collection under the title of Heldenbuch ("Book of Heroes").

=== Wolfdietrich A ===
- MS A, the Ambraser Heldenbuch (Vienna, Austrian National Library, Cod. Ser. nova 2663), written 1507–1516 by Hans Ried—contains Ortnit and 606 strophes of Wolfdietrich
- MS k, the Dresden Heldenbuch (Dresden, State Library, Mscr. M 201), dated 1472, written by Kaspar von der Roen
- MS W (Vienna, Austrian National Library, Cod. 2779), early 14th century, contains only Ortnit in the same version as A and k. However, Ornit was originally followed by a number of blank pages, which may originally have been meant for Wolfdietrich.

=== Wolfdietrich B ===
- MS B (Vienna, Austrian National Library, Cod. 2947), late 15th century
- MS H (Berlin, State Library, mgq 761), second half of 15th century
- MS K (Heidelberg, University Library, Cpg 109), written 1516–1527

The MSS of Wolfdietrich B do not include Ortnit.

=== Wolfdietrich C ===
- The Berlin-Wolfenbüttel Heldenbuch, written in the first half of 14th century, preserved in five fragments ranging from a single sheet to two folios, though two of the fragments are now missing.

=== Wolfdietrich D ===
Ten manuscripts from the late 15th and early 16th centuries, including

- MS c, the Strassburg Heldenbuch of Diebolt von Hanow
- MS d, the Johanniter Heldenbuch
- MS y, Lienhart Scheubels Heldenbuch, 1480–1490

==== The Strassburg Heldenbuch ====
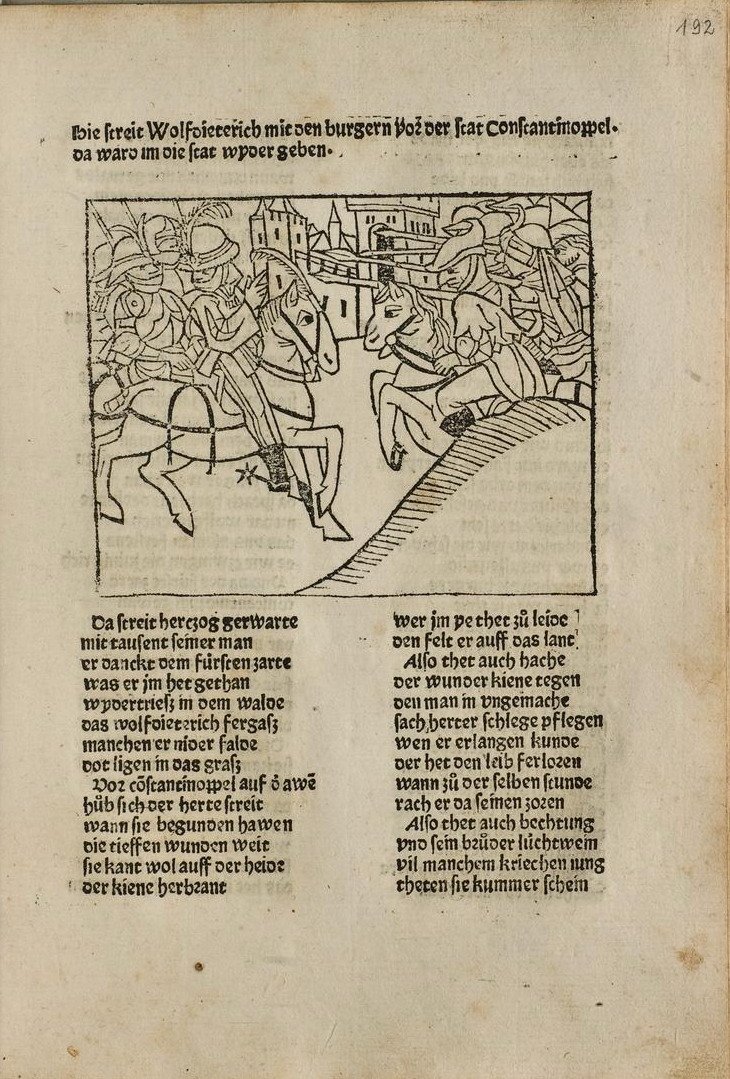
Page from the Strassburg Heldenbuch of Johann Prüss, 1479 (page 383). The caption reads, "Here Wolfdieterich fought with the citizens before the city of Constantinople; the city was given back to him."

In 1479 Johann Prüss printed a Heldenbuch which included Ornit, Wolfdietrich and three other works, with 230 woodcuts. The text came primarily from the source used in the Heldenbuch of Diebolt von Hanow (MS c). It was subsequently reprinted, with variations and different woodcuts, by others in 1491, 1509, 1545, 1560 and 1590.

The Strassburg Heldenbuch was used as the source for a dramatic trilogy by Jakob Ayrer published in 1618:

- Vom HuegDieterichen / und seinem Sohn WolffDieterichen / König in Griechenland
- Vom dem Keiser Ottnit
- Von WolffDieterichen / dem König aus Griechenland

== Editions ==
- von der Hagen, Friedrich Heinrich (1855). Heldenbuch: altdeutsche Heldenlieder aus dem Sagenkreise Dietrichs von Bern und der Nibelungen. Vol. I. Leipzig: Hermann Schultze. (Wolfdietrich A, B and C)
- Holtzmann, Adolf, ed. (1865). Der grosse Wolfdietrich. Heidelberg: Mohr.
- von Keller, Adelbert, ed. (1865). Ayrers Dramen. Vol. 2. Stuttgart: Literarischer Verein in Stuttgart. pp. 943–1205.
- von Keller, Adelbert, ed. (1867). Das deutsche Heldenbuch Nach dem mutmasslich ältesten Drucke. Stuttgart: Literarischer Verein in Stuttgart. Reprint. Hildesheim: Georg Olms. 1966. ISBN 978-3487512983. (The Strassburg Heldenbuch of 1479)
- Amelung, Arthur; Jänicke, Oskar, eds. (1871). Deutsches Heldenbuch, dritter Teil: Ortnit und die Wolfdietriche. Berlin: Weidmann. (Includes editions of all four versions of the poem, with detailed introductions.)
- Lunzer, Justus, Edler von Lindhausen (1906). Ortneit und Wolfdietrich nach der Wiener Piaristenhandschrift. Tübingen: Laupp. (MS y, Lienhart Scheubels Heldenbuch—the text of Wolfdietrich starts on p. 58.)
- Schneider, Hermann, ed. (1931). Wolfdietrich: 1. Heft: der Echte Teil des Wolfdietrich der Ambraser Handschrift (Wolfdietrich A). Altdeutsche Textbibliothek, 28. Tübingen: Niemeyer.
- Fuchs, Edward A. H., ed. (1935). Studies in the Dresdener Heldenbuch: An Edition of Wolfdietrich K. Chicago: University of Chicago. (MS k in current usage, not the Heidelberg MS K.)
- Kofler, Walter, ed. (1999). Das Strassburger Heldenbuch : Rekonstruktion der Textfassung des Diebolt von Hanowe. Göppingen: Kümmerle. ISBN 3874529134.
- Kofler, Walter, ed. (2001). Ortnit und Wolfdietrich D. Kritischer Text nach Ms. Carm. 2 der Stadt- und Universitätsbibliothek Frankfurt am Main. Stuttgart: Hirzel. ISBN 978-3777611297.
- Kofler, Walter, ed. (2006). Das Dresdener Heldenbuch und die Bruchstücke des Berlin-Wolfenbütteler Heldenbuchs : Edition und Digitalfaksimile. Stuttgart: Hirzel. ISBN 9783777614359.
- Kofler, Walter, ed. (2008). Wolfdietrich B. Paralleledition der Redaktionen B/K und H. Stuttgart: Hirzel. ISBN 9783777616230.
- Kofler, Walter, ed. (2009a). Ortnit und Wolfdietrich A. Stuttgart: Hirzel. ISBN 978-3777616438.
- Fuchs-Jolie, Stephan; Millet, Victor; Peschel, Dietmar, eds. (2013). Otnit. Wolf Dietrich. Frühneuhochdeutsch / Neuhochdeutsch. Stuttgart: Reclam. ISBN 978-3-15-019139-2.

== Translations ==
- Weber, Henry William; Jamieson, Robert; Scott, Walter (1814). "Das Heldenbuch—The Book of Heroes". Illustrations of Northern Antiquities from the earlier Teutonic and Scandinavian Romances; being an abstract of the Book of Heroes and Nibelungen Lay; with translations from the old German, Danish, Swedish, and Icelandic languages; with notes and dissertations. Edinburgh: Longman, Hurst, Rees, Orme, and Brown. pp. 45–136. (Prose translation of Wolfdietrich A, with some passages of verse.)
- Guerber, H.A. (1896). Legends Of The Middle Ages Narrated With Special Reference To Literature And Art. New York, Cincinnati, Chicago: American Book Company. pp. 94–109. (A retelling rather than a translation. Reprinted several times under various titles.)
- Ortnit and Wolfdietrich. Two Medieval Romances. Translated by Thomas, J.W. Columbia, SC: Camden House. 1986. ISBN 0938100408.
- Kudrun: With the Book of King Otnit and the Book of Wolf Dietrich. Translated by Whobrey, William T. Indianapolis: Hackett Publishing. 2025. ISBN 9781647922108.
