= Treuer Eckart =

Character from Germanic heroic legend and German folklore

Eckart, commonly called der treue Eckart or treuer Eckart (the faithful Eckart (German: [deːɐ̯ ˈtʁɔɪ̯ə ˈɛkaʁt]) or faithful Eckart (German: [ˈtʁɔɪ̯ɐ ˈɛkaʁt]) respectively), is a character of Germanic heroic legend, particularly the legends about Dietrich von Bern, and also features in German legends about the wild hunt.

== In heroic legend ==
In heroic legend, Eckart, also called Eckehart or Eckewart, is the guardian of the Harlungs, two young men whose late father Diether bequeathed them the Breisgau territory, Breisach Castle, and immeasurable treasure. He is a Harlung himself, and has great renown for his loyalty and faithfulness, treating his charges, the cousins of Dietrich von Bern, as faithfully as their father before them, whose trusty advisor he had been.

One day, when Eckart was absent, King Ermenrich, uncle of the Harlungs, driven by both greed for his nephews’ heritage and his advisor Sibeche’s slanderous, fraudulent remarks about the Harlungs' allegedly licentious life including assault on the queen, suddenly and without warning conquered Breisach Castle, hung his nephews, and took their property for himself.

During the Rabenschlacht battle, Eckart took Sibeche captive and dragged him away on horseback to be hung on the gallows. He also took revenge for the demise of his charges when he and other heroes slew Ermenrich.

== As guardian spirit ==
The rich treasure of the Harlungs, the Harlungenhort, is said to be enchanted and hidden inside the mountain Bürglenberg near Breisach. This treasure is guarded by the spirit of treuer Eckart who warns every treasure seeker that this treasure is fated to fall into the hands of the true heir of the Harlungs, making him a rich lord of the territory. This gave rise to the saying, Du bist der treue Eckart, du warnest jedermann, i.e. you are the faithful Eckart, you are warning everybody.

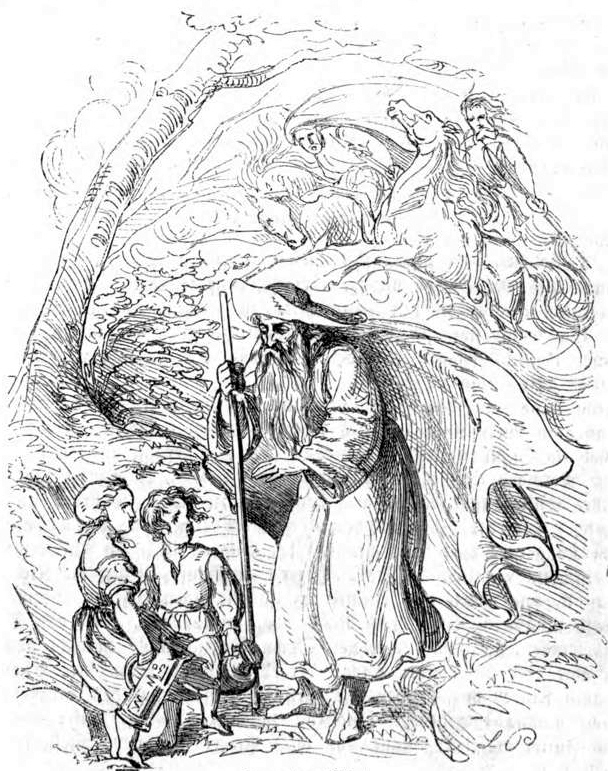
Eckart consoling the children whose beer was taken

In Thuringia, der treue Eckart is connected with the wild hunt, locally called wütendes Heer or furious host. Leader of the wild hunt is Frau Holle or Frau Holla who roams the countryside with the furious host during Christmas, namely the Zwölften, that is the Twelve Nights of Christmas. Der treue Eckart goes ahead of the wild hunt, warning the people to step out of the way so they will suffer no harm. Near Schwarza, once some boys had fetched beer in the tavern for their parents when they encountered the furious host. Stepping aside, the boys still caught the eyes of some women travelling with the wild hunt who stepped up and drank the beer. The frightened children did not dare utter a word. When the furious host had passed, der treue Eckart told the children that their silence and willingness to part with the beer had saved their lives, for otherwise the women would have wrung their necks. He further added that as long as the boys would keep silent about their encounter the jugs would remain filled with beer, thus keeping them safe from the scolding which would have occurred had they returned with empty jugs. The children told their parents after three days, which according to a different version was the time Eckart told them to keep the secret.

According to other variants, the leader of the furious host is Frau Venus, Frau Hulda or Herodias, but always there is der treue Eckart, proverbially warning everybody to stay out of the way. His appearance is that of an old man with a staff. When the furious host doesn’t travel and stays inside Hörselberg Mountain, der treue Eckart sits outside the cave, warning everybody against entering the realm of Frau Venus from where there is no return. Thus, he also is called an angel in human shape placed there by God. That der treue Eckart guards the entrance to the Venusberg, i.e. the mountain of Frau Venus, and advises people against entering is known since 1453 if not longer, giving rise to the saying mentioned above. In Denmark, he also is found warning people before entering a brothel, and a chronicle from 1566 places him as a judge at the gates of hell. His appearance is also given as a tall gray man with a scepter in his hand, or as an old man with a white staff. He also is said to not only warn the people to step aside when the wild hunt comes through but also tell some people to go quickly home to avoid harm. In 1677, the buzzing in the ears was called Eckart’s warning voice.

== Literature ==
- Ludwig Bechstein: Deutsches Sagenbuch. Meiningen 1852. (reprint: F. W. Hendel Verlag, Meersburg/Leipzig 1930.)
- Ludwig Bechstein: Thüringer Sagenbuch: Band 1. Coburg 1858. (reprint: Verlag Rockstuhl, Bad Langensalza 2014, ISBN 978-3-936030-07-5)
- Wilhelm Grimm, Jacob Grimm: Deutsche Sagen: Vollständige Ausgabe mit Illustrationen von Otto Ubbellohde. Kassel 1818 (reprint: Nikol, Hamburg 2014, ISBN 978-3-86820-245-8).
- Edmund Mudrak: Das große Buch der Sagen. Ensslin, Würzburg 2007, ISBN 978-3-401-45307-1)
- Singer: Eckart. In: Hanns Bächtold-Stäubli, Eduard Hoffmann-Krayer: Handwörterbuch des Deutschen Aberglaubens: Band 2 C.M.B.-Frautragen. Berlin 1930. (reprint: Walter de Gruyter, Berlin/New York 2000, ISBN 978-3-11-016860-0)
