= Theudebert =

Theudebert (also Theodobert, Theudibert, Theodebert, Theodbert, Dietbert, Tibert, etc.) is a Germanic dithematic name, composed from the elements theo- "people" and bert "bright". The name is attested primarily in the German Middle Ages. The Cat character in Reynard the Fox is called either Tibert or Tybalt.

Historical people called Theobert include:

- Two Frankish kings of Austrasia:
  - Theudebert I (r. 533–548); his name is given as Θευδιβερτος by Procopius and Agathias
  - Theudebert II (r. 595–612)
- Theodbert of Bavaria, Duke of Bavaria c. 716 – c. 719
- Theodebert, Count of Meaux in 877–888
- one Dietbert or Theobert of Tholey, locally venerated as a saint in the 13th century
