= Wade (folklore) =

Figure in Germanic and Norse mythology

Wade (Old English: Ƿada [ˈwɑdɑ]) is the English name for a common Germanic mythological character who, depending on location, is also known as Vadi (Norse) and Wate (Middle High German).

== Overview ==
The earliest mention occurs in the Old English poem Widsith. According to the Þiðrekssaga, he was born between king Wilkinus and a serpent-legged mermaid named Wachilt, a goddess of the sea and sometimes referred to as a "sea witch". His famous son is Wayland, and his grandson Wudga. Though not explicitly stated as such, Egil and Slagfin may be Wade's sons, since they are Wayland's brothers according to the Poetic Edda.

A medieval English romance about Wade once existed, for Chaucer alluded to the "Tale of Wade" in one of his works, Troilus and Criseyde, (Note: Troilus and Criseyde: "With sobre chere, although his herte pleyde: / And in the feld he pleyde tho leoun; / He song; she pleyde; he tolde tale of Wade. / But natheles, he japed thus, and pleyde, / And on the walles of the town they pleyde, / From haselwode, there joly Robyn pleyde.") and used the phrase "Wade's boat" (Middle English: Wades boot), meaning some sort of trickery, in The Merchant's Tale. At the end of the 16th century, the tale and the boat were apparently familiar to an editor of Chaucer's works Thomas Speght, who remarked that Wade's boat bore the name Guingelot. A c. 1330 manuscript version of Bevis of Hampton also may have alluded to an episode in the lost romance, in naming Wade as an early example of a knight who slew a fire-breathing dragon. To the Angles, Wade was the Keeper of the Ford, and acted as both ferryman and protector.

== Thidrekssaga ==
Wade has always had a strong association with the sea or water. In the saga about Wade's family, the Vilkina saga (part of the Þiðrekssaga), it is said that Wade (Vadi; Old Norse: Vaði) was born between King Vilkinus and a mermaid ( Old Norse: sjókona; lit. "sea woman").

Wade first apprenticed his son Wayland (Old Norse: Vǫlundr) to Mimir, from the age 9 to 12, and later to two dwarves living in Mount Kallava. He went from his home in Sjoland (=Sjælland, i.e., Zealand) to Grœnasund sound (in Denmark), and finding no ship sailing out, he waded across the sound in waters nine ells deep while carrying his young son Wayland on his shoulder. (Note: This ability is one which is also ascribed to Thunor, and was the cause of a friendship which grew up between them.) After the boy studied for two stretches of 12 months, Wade came to fetch his son from the reluctant dwarves, and was killed in a landslide caused by an earthquake.

In the aftermath, the son (Wayland) slays the dwarves and sets off in a boat he crafts, windowed with glass, reaching the land of King Nidung.

== Wade in Chaucer ==
In Chaucer's Merchant's Tale, the following reference to Wade's boat occurs:

And bet than old boef is the tendre veel... And eek thise old wydwes, God it woot, They konne so muchel craft on Wades boot, So muchel broken harm, whan that hem leste, That with hem sholde I nevere lyve in reste... —1.209-14	And better than old beef is tender veal... and also these old widows, God knows it, They can play so much craft on Wade's boat, So much harm, when they like it, That with them should I never live in rest....

It is clear that, in this context, Wade's boat is being used as a sexual euphemism. However, it is debatable whether this single indirect reference can be taken to demonstrate fertility aspects are a part of his character.

Wade is also mentioned in Chaucer's poem Troilus and Criseyde (Book 3, line 614), when Pandarus tells the "tale of Wade" to Criseyde.

=== Guingelot ===
Thomas Speght, an editor of Chaucer's works from the end of 16th century, made a passing remark that "Concerning Wade and his bote called Guingelot, and also his strange exploits in the same, because the matter is long and fabulous, I pass it over" There may have been widespread knowledge of Wade's adventure in his time, but it has not been transmitted to the present day, and subsequent commentators have deplored Speght's omission. "Wingelock" is Skeat's reconstructed Anglicized form of the boat's name. (Note: Skeat objects to Michel's conjecture that the name reduces to Ganglate "going slowly".)

The boat's name closely resembles Gringolet, the name of Sir Gawaine's horse. Gollancz tries to make a reconstruction on the Germanic origins of the name. Still, it is based on a lot of assumptions: that Wade's boat was a winged boat, whose Germanic name was Wingalet or Wingalock, confused with Wade's son Wayland's feathered flying contraption. And while he concedes that the better form of the horse's name is "Guingelot" without the "r", he was dismissive of the view the name was of Celtic in origin, as expressed by Gaston Paris.

== Old English fragment of Wade ==
In the 19th century, three lines from the lost Old English Tale of Wade were found, quoted in a Latin homily in MS. 255 in the Library of Peterhouse, Cambridge:

Ita quod dicere possunt cum Wade:

Summe sende ylves & summe sende nadderes,
sumne sende nikeres the biden watez wunien.
Nister man nenne bute ildebrand onne.

"The homilist cites some comments made by Wade in the Tale:

Some are elves, some are adders,
and some are nixies that (dwell near water?).
There is no man except Hildebrand alone."

—Wentersdorf tr.

On the same passage, Gollancz gave the following alternate translation: "We may say with Wade that [all creatures who fell] became elves or adders or nickors who live in pools; not one became a man except Hildebrand" (Note: Note that while Wentersdorf above had interpreted (and interpolated) that these words were spoken "by Wade in the Tale", Gollancz allowed for narrator or any character in the tale entitled Wade to have spoken, not necessarily Wade himself.)

The context of the quote has been variously conjectured. Rickert speculated that the situation resembled the scene in the Waldere fragment, "in which Widia, Wate's grandson, and Hildebrand rescue Theodoric from a den of monsters". Karl P. Wentersdorf stated that "Wade is here boasting of his victorious adventures with many kinds of creatures". Alaric Hall ventures that some antagonistic force has magically "sent" monstrous beings to beset Wade, though he cautions that the fragment is too short for certainty. (Note: Gollancz and Wentersdorf evidently identify the verb here as wesan "to be" thus translating as "became" or "are", whereas A. Hall construed the verb as sendan "to send".)

In 2025 it was suggested by James Wade and Seb Falk that the quote was misquoted and reads as follows:

Some are wolves and some are adders; some are sea snakes that dwell by the water. There is no man at all but Hildebrand.

“Here were three lines apparently talking about elves and sea monsters which exactly puts you in this world of Beowulf and other Teutonic legends,” said Dr. Wade. “What we realized is that there are no elves in this passage, there are no sea monsters and, in the study of the handwriting, everyone has gotten it wrong until now.”

== Folklore ==
Stones at Mulgrave near Whitby were said to be the grave of the dead sea-giant (they were known as "Waddes grave"). A tale was told of Sleights Moor in Eskdale, North Yorkshire. During the building of Mulgrave Castle and Pickering Castle, Wade and his wife Bell would throw a hammer to and fro over the hills. (A possible Roman road, called "Wade's Causeway" or "Wade's Wife's Causey" locally, was also said to have been built in this manner.) One day Wade's son grew impatient for his milk and hurled a stone that weighed a few tonnes across Eskdale to where his mother was milking her cow at Swarthow on Egton Low Moor. The stone hit Bell with such force that a part of it broke off and could be seen for many years until it was broken up to mend the highways.

In local folklore, the Hole of Horcum in North Yorkshire was formed where Wade scooped up earth to throw at his wife.

== Legacy ==
The Middle-earth character Eärendil sails the sky in a ship named Vingilot or Wingelot, which scholars note is close to the name of Wade's boat Guingelot. In one of his linguistic writings, Parma Eldalamberon 15, the creator of Middle-earth, J. R. R. Tolkien, explicitly noted "Wade = Earendel". Tolkien's biographer Humphrey Carpenter remarked that Eärendil "was in fact the beginning of Tolkien's own mythology".
