= Velents þáttr smiðs =

Velents þáttr smiðs is the name given to the part of the Þiðrekssaga af Bern saga that deals with Wayland the Smith (Velent, Wieland, Völundr).

== Summary ==
Velent is the son of the giant Vaði from Sjaelland. He is sent as an apprentice to Mímir, a smith from Húnaland. But Sigurðr is also there by that time, and he beats the other apprentices. When Vaði learns that, he brings Velent back home and sends him to two skilful dwarves who live in a mountain called Kallava. The dwarves agree to teach Velent everything they know, but threaten to kill him if his father does not fetch him at the appointed time. Vaði dies in an avalanche, but Velent escapes the dwarves' threat by killing them.

Velent then sails to Denmark in a hollowed-out tree and eventually arrives at Jutland, where king Niðung is reigning. Velent is soon challenged by Niðung's smith Amilias. Amilias forges a suit of armour, while Velent forges the sword Mímung, with which he easily kills his rival. Velent thus gains great fame as a smith.

At the eve of a battle, Niðung realises that he has forgotten his victory stone and offers his daughter and half of his kingdom to the one who can get it before sunset. Velent fetches the stone but, when he brings it to the arm, the king's dróttseti (seneschal) asks for it. Velent refuses to give it up and kills the knight. Niðung banishes him.

Later, Velent tries to avenge himself by poisoning the king and his daughter, but he gets caught, is hamstrung, and is set to work in the forge. But he eventually kills Niðung's two younger sons in his smithy and makes a whole set of tableware for the king out of their bones. He also seduces the king's daughter, getting her pregnant.

Velent's brother Egill comes to the court. He is a famous archer and Niðung challenges him to shoot an apple from the head of his son. Egill is only allowed to shoot only one arrow, but prepares three. After he succeeds with his first arrow, the King Niðung asks him what the other two were for, and he explains that had he hit the King's son, he would have shot the king with the others.

Velent asks his brother to collect feathers, with which he makes himself wings. He flies to Niðung and reveals to him that he has killed his sons and got his daughter pregnant. He then flies away. Egill is ordered by the king to shoot him down. But Velent has tied a bladder filled with blood under his arm. Egill hits it, thus deceiving the king, and Velent returns to Sjaelland.

Niðung dies shortly after and his surviving son Otvin succeeds him. The princess gives birth to a son called Viðga. Velent settles a peace agreement with Otvin and he marries the princess, as they both had agreed before his escape.

== See also ==
- Völundarkviða
