= Völundarkviða =

Eddic poem

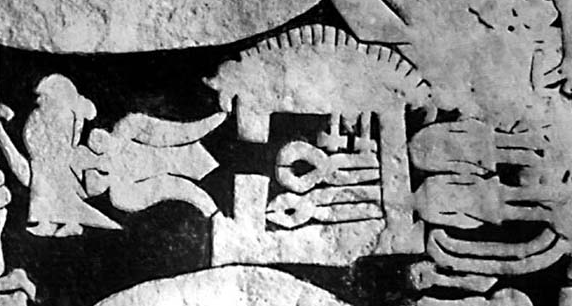
From Ardre image stone VIII. Vǫlundr's smithy in the centre, Níðuðr's daughter to the left, and Níðuðr's dead sons hidden to the right of the smithy. Between the girl and the smithy, Vǫlundr can be seen flying away, apparently in bird form.

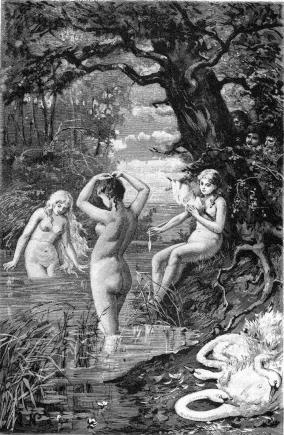
Völundr and his two brothers see the swan-maidens bathing. Illustration by Jenny Nyström, 1893.

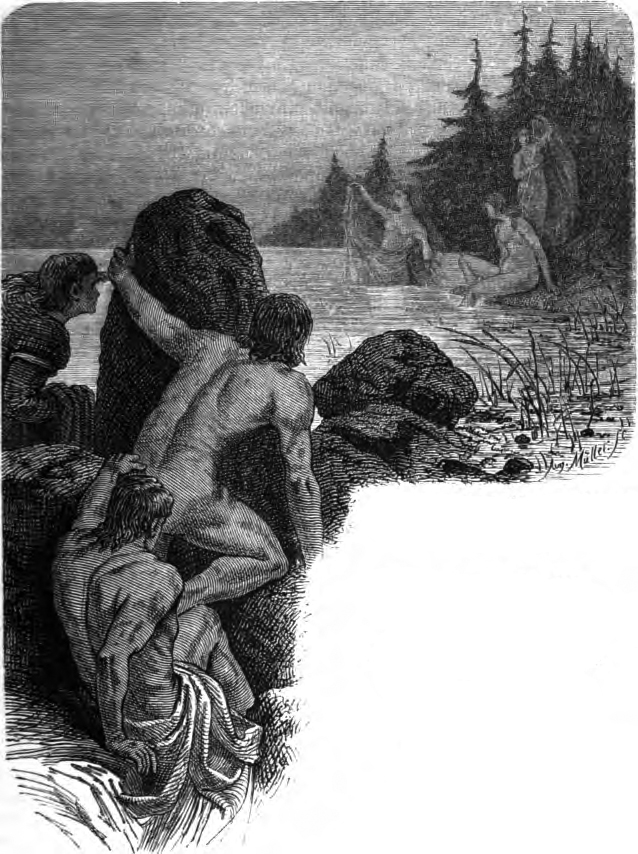
"The three smith boys spy and later marry three valkyrie maidens" (1882) by Friedrich Wilhelm Heine.

Vǫlundarkviða (Old Norse: 'The lay of Völund'; modern Icelandic spelling: Völundarkviða) is one of the mythological poems of the Poetic Edda. The title is anglicized in various ways, including Völundarkvitha, Völundarkvidha, Völundarkvida, Volundarkvitha, Volundarkvidha and Volundarkvida.

== Manuscripts, origins, and analogues ==
The poem is preserved in its entirety among the mythological poems of the thirteenth-century Icelandic manuscript Codex Regius, and the beginning of the prose prologue is also found in the AM 748 I 4to fragment.

The vocabulary and some of the formulaic phrasing of the poem is clearly influenced by West Germanic, with the strongest case being for influence specifically from Old English (a West Germanic dialect). It is thought likely, therefore, that Vǫlundarkviða was composed in, or otherwise influenced by traditions from, the Norse diaspora in England. This would suggest origins around the tenth or eleventh century. This fits in turn with the fact that most of the analogues to Vǫlundarkviða are West-Germanic in origin.

In visual sources, the story told in Vǫlundarkviða seems also to be portrayed on the front panel of the eighth-century Northumbrian Franks Casket and on the eighth-century Gotlandic Ardre image stone VIII, along with a number of tenth-to-eleventh-century carvings from Northern England, including the Leeds Cross, a fragment in Leeds City Museum, and Sherburn in Elmet fragments 2 and 3.

In written sources, a largely similar story (Velents þáttr smiðs) is related in the Old Norse Þiðrekssaga af Bern (translated from lost Low German sources), and an evidently similar story is alluded to in the first two verse-paragraphs of Old English poem Deor.

Equivalent character names
Vǫlundarkviða	Dēor	Þiðreks saga
Vǫlundr	Wēlund	Velent
Níðuðr	Nīðhād	Níðungr
Bǫðvildr	Beaduhild	Heren

== Synopsis ==
The poem relates the story of the artisan Völundr, his capture by Níðuðr, implicitly a petty-king of Närke (currently in Sweden), and Vǫlundr's brutal revenge and escape.

=== Prose introduction ===
Vǫlundarkviða begins with a prose introduction, setting the scene, giving background about the characters, and partly summarising the poem. It is possible that this passage is much younger than the verse.

=== Stanzas 1–6 ===
The poem opens by describing the flight of three swan-maidens identified in stanza 1 as meyjar, drósir, alvitr and suðrœnar ('young women, stately women, foreign beings, southerners') to a 'sævar strǫnd' ('lake/sea-shore') where they meet the three brothers Egill, Slagfiðr and Vǫlundr. Each maid takes one of the brothers as her own.

However, nine winters later, the women leave the brothers. The poem does not explain this, simply saying that the women depart 'ørlǫg drýgja' ('to fulfil their fate'). Slagfiðr and Egill go in search of their women, but Vǫlundr remains at home instead, forging baugar (‘(arm-)rings’) for his woman.

=== Stanzas 7–19 ===
Discovering that Vǫlundr is living alone, a local king, Níðuðr, ‘lord of the Njárar’, has him captured in his sleep (stanzas 7–12).

Níðuðr takes Vǫlundr's sword and gives one of the rings which Vǫlundr made for his missing bride to his daughter Bǫðvildr, and, at his wife's instigation, he has Vǫlundr's hamstrings cut, imprisoning him on an island called Sævarstaðr, where Vǫlundr makes objects for Níðuðr (stanzas 13–19).

=== Stanzas 20–41 ===
Vǫlundr takes his revenge on Níðuðr first by enticing Níðuðr's two sons to visit with promises of treasure, killing them, and making jewels of their eyes and teeth (stanzas 20–26). He then entices Bǫðvildr by promising to mend the ring which she was given, getting her drunk, and implicitly having sex with her (stanzas 27–29).

The poem culminates in Vǫlundr taking to the air by some means which is not clearly described and telling Níðuðr what he has done, laughing (stanzas 30–39). It focuses finally on the plight of Bǫðvildr, whose lament closes the poem (stanzas 40–41):

Ek vætr hánom
vinna kunnak,
ek vætr hánom
vinna máttak.

Translation:

I did not know how to
struggle against him at all,
I was not able to
struggle against him at all.

It relates to type 313 and 313C in the Aarne–Thompson–Uther Index. Similar tales have types 400 and 465.

== Editions and translations ==
=== English translations ===
- Henry Adams Bellows (trans.), The Poetic Edda, Scandinavian Classics, 21-22 (Princeton [N.J.]: Princeton University Press, 1936): translation only; translation with facing Old Norse text.
- Benjamin Thorpe (trans.), Edda Sæmundar Hinns Froða: The Edda Of Sæmund The Learned, 2 vols (London: Trübner & Co. 1866). Reprinted 1906 as Rasmus B. Anderson & J. W. Buel (Eds.) The Elder Eddas of Saemund Sigfusson. London, Stockholm, Copenhagen, Berlin, New York: Norrœna Society. Available online at Google Books. Searchable graphic image version requiring DjVu plugin available at University of Georgia Libraries: Facsimile Books and Periodicals: The Elder Eddas and the Younger Eddas.
- W. H. Auden and P. B. Taylor (trans.), The Elder Edda: A Selection (London: Faber, 1969): here.
- Dronke, Ursula (ed. & trans.) (1997). The Poetic Edda, vol. II, Mythological Poems. Oxford: Clarendon. ISBN 0-19-811181-9.

=== Old Norse editions ===
- Sophus Bugge (ed.), Norrœn fornkvæði: Islandsk Samling af Oldtidsdigte om Nordens Guder og Heroer almndelig kaldet Sæmundar Edda hins fróða (Oslo: Aschehough, 1926): Völundarkviða, manuscript spelling.
- Guðni Jónsson (ed.), Eddukvæði (Sæmundar-Edda), 2 vols (Reykjavík: Íslendingasagnaútgáfan, 1949): Völundarkviða, normalised spelling.
- Jón Helgason (ed.), Tvær kviður fornar: Vọlundarkviða og Atlakviða (Reykjavík: Heimskringla, 1966).
- Ursula Dronke (ed. & trans.), The Poetic Edda, Volume II: Mythological Poems (Oxford: Clarendon, 1997). ISBN 0-19-811181-9.
