= Culture of Närke =

Traditional Swedish provencial culture

Närke, is a province in Central Sweden, which historically formed part of Svealand. The name of the province is partly derived from an old name for the people of the province, the Njarar (Njars) or Nerikjar (today Närkingar). The root nari, neri is cognate to English narrow and refers to the narrow inlets that characterized the geography, a tribe that is also mentioned in the lay of Völund (Weyland the Smith):

"When the Lord of the Njars, Nidud, heard
That Völund sat in Wolfdale alone,
He sent warriors forth: white their shield-bosses
In the waning moon, and their mail glittered."

- Translated by W. H. Auden and P. B. Taylor

The next source for Närke appears in Heimskringla by Snorri Sturluson, where we learn that Nerike had a king named Olof the Sharp-sighted whose granddaughter married king Ingjald ill-ruler, the king of Sweden. King Ingjald kills King Sporsnjall of Nerike, proclaiming himself the ruler of all of Sweden. When Ingjald is killed by Ivar Vidfamne, Ingjald's son Olof Trätälja settles in Närke with what remains of the House of Yngling and their loyal men. They are later chased away and have to settle in the wasteland of Värmland which they colonize.

A powerful man in Närke called Sigtryg received the Norwegian King Olaf the Holy 1028-1029 before Olaf's departure for Russia and its ruler Yaroslav I the Wise:

"It is to be related of King Olaf's journey, that he went first from Norway eastward through Eid forest to Vermaland, then to Vatnsby, and through the forests in which there are roads, until he came out in Nerike district. There dwelt a rich and powerful man in that part called Sigtryg, who had a son, Ivar, who afterwards became a distinguished person. Olaf stayed with Sigtryg all spring (A.D. 1029); and when summer came he made ready for a journey, procured a ship for himself, and without stopping went on to Russia to King Jarisleif and his queen Ingegerd"

According to local traditions Olaf baptized many locals and the well he used can be seen near Hallsberg in the parish of Hardemo.
