= Wayland the Smith =

Germanic mythological blacksmith

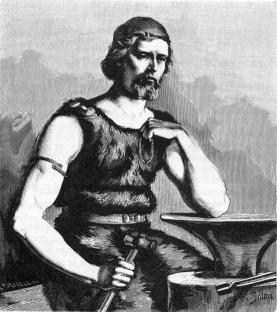
Wayland in Fredrik Sander's 1893 Swedish edition of the Poetic Edda

Wayland the Smith (Old English: Wēland; Old Norse: Vǫlundr) is a legendary master blacksmith in Norse and Germanic mythology, renowned for his craftsmanship, cunning, and the saga surrounding his captivity and revenge.

Wayland's story is most clearly told in the Old Norse sources Völundarkviða (a poem in the Poetic Edda) and Þiðreks saga. In them, Wayland is a smith who is enslaved by a king. Wayland takes revenge by killing the king's sons and then escapes by crafting a winged cloak and flying away. Other sources clearly allude to similar stories, most prominently the Old English poem Deor and the Franks Casket. Wayland is also mentioned in passing in a wide range of texts, such as the Old English Waldere and Beowulf, as the maker of weapons and armour.

== Name ==
The name "Wayland" originates from Proto-Germanic *Wēlandaz, deriving from *Wilą-ndz (literally "crafting one"). It appears in Old Norse as "Vǫlundr" or "Velent", in Old Frisian as "Wela(n)du", in Old High German as "Wiolant" (compare modern German Wieland Der Schmied), and in Old French as "Galans" or "Galant".

== Attestations ==
=== Earliest evidence ===
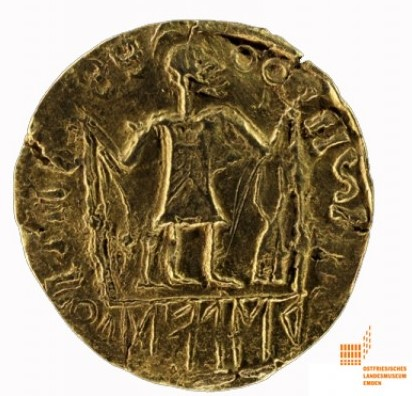
Gold solidius dated AD 575−625; wela(n)du in runes of the Elder Futhark. Found near Schweindorf, East Frisia, Germany.

The oldest reference known to Wayland the Smith is possibly a gold solidus with a Frisian runic inscription ᚹᛖᛚᚪᛞᚢ wela[n]du 'wayland'. It is not certain whether the coin depicts the legendary smith or bears the name of a moneyer who happened to be called Wayland (perhaps because he had taken the name of the legendary smith as an epithet). The coin was found near Schweindorf, in the region Ostfriesland in north-west Germany, and is dated AD 575–625.

=== Scandinavian ===
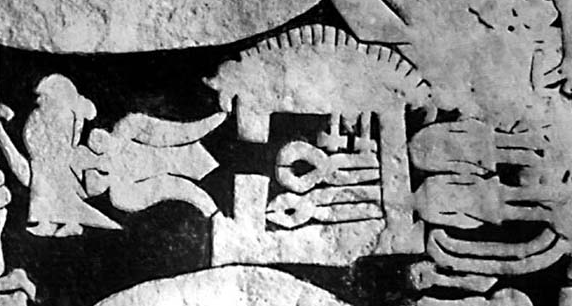
Völund's smithy in the centre, Niðhad's daughter to the left, and Niðhad's dead sons hidden to the right of the smithy. Between the girl and the smithy, Völund can be seen in a fjaðrhamr flying away. From the Ardre image stone VIII.

==== Visual ====
Wayland's legend is depicted on Ardre image stone VIII, and probably on a tenth-century copper mount found in Uppåkra in 2011. A number of other possible visual representations exist in early medieval Scandinavia, but are harder to verify as they do not contain enough distinctive features corresponding to the story of Wayland found in textual sources.

==== Völundarkviða ====
According to Völundarkviða, the king of the Finns (the Old Norse term for the Finnish people, Baltic Finnic peoples and Sámi) had three sons: Völundr (Wayland) and his two brothers Egil and Slagfiðr. In one version of the myth, the three brothers lived with three Valkyries: Ölrún, Hervör alvitr and Hlaðguðr svanhvít. After nine years, the Valkyries left their lovers. Egil and Slagfiðr followed, never to return. In another version, Völundr married the swan maiden Hervör, and they had a son, Heime, but Hervör later left Völundr. In both versions, his love left him with a ring. In the former myth, he forged seven hundred duplicates of this ring.

Later, King Niðhad captured Völundr in his sleep in Nerike and ordered him hamstrung and imprisoned on the island of Sævarstöð. There Völundr was forced to forge items for the king. Völundr's wife's ring was given to the king's daughter, Böðvildr. Niðhad wore Völundr's sword.

In revenge, Völundr killed the king's sons when they visited him in secret, and fashioned goblets from their skulls, jewels from their eyes, and a brooch from their teeth. He sent the goblets to the king, the jewels to the queen and the brooch to the king's daughter. When Böðvild takes her ring to Völundr for mending, he tricks and seduces her, and gets her pregnant. Later, he flies to Niðhad's hall where he explains how he has murdered the king's sons, fashioned jewelry from their bodies and fathered a child with Böðvild. The crying king laments that his archers and horsemen can't reach Völundr, as the smith flies away never to be seen again. Niðhad summons his daughter, asking her if Völundr's story was true. The poem ends with Böðvild stating that she was unable to protect herself from Völundr as he was too strong for her.

==== Þiðreks saga ====
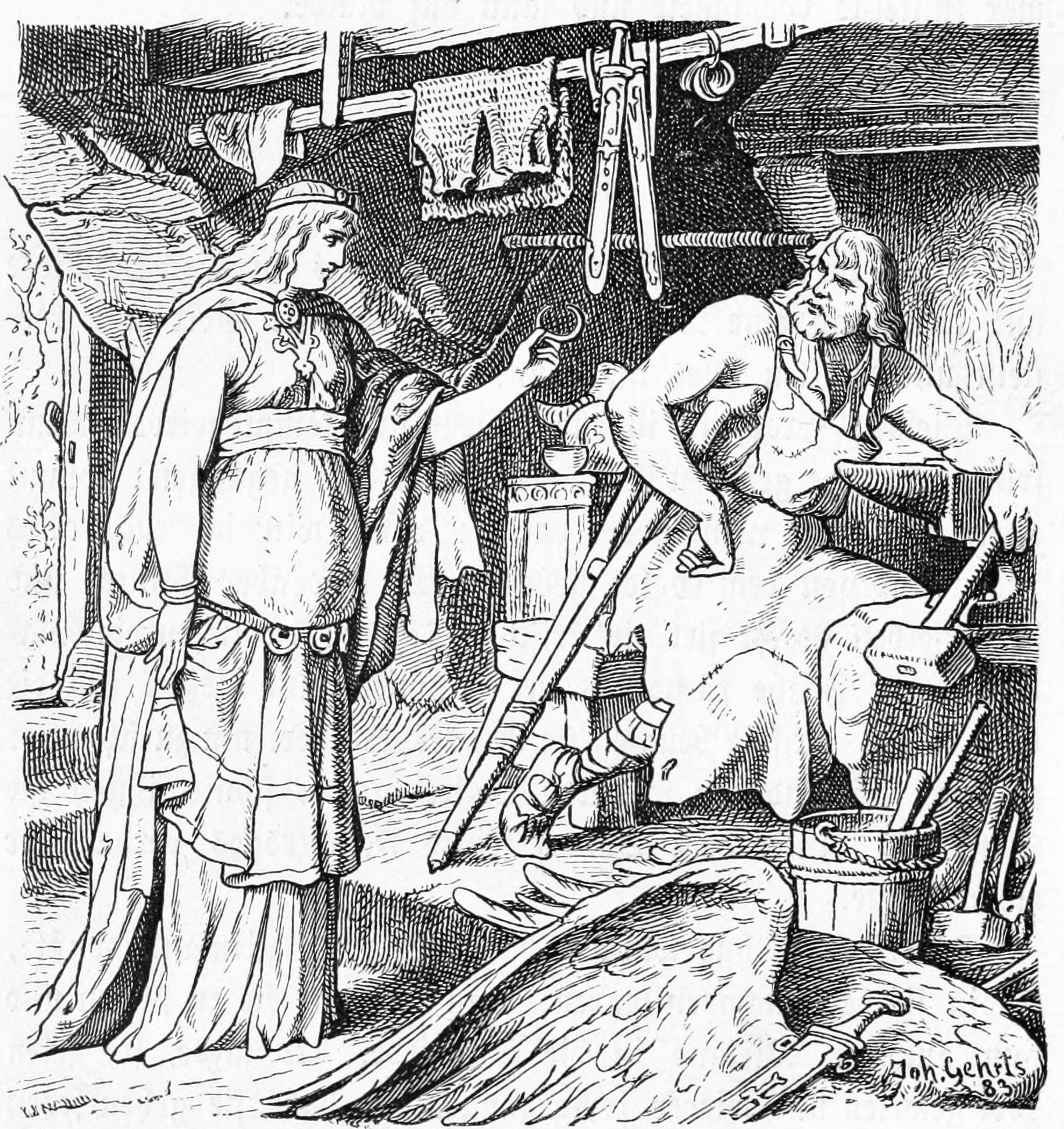
Böðvild in Wayland's forge

Þiðreks saga also includes a version of the story of Wayland (Old Norse: Velent). This part of the saga is sometimes called Velents þáttr smiðs.

The events described at King Niðung's court (identifiable with Niðhad in the Eddic lay) broadly follow the version in the Poetic Edda (though in the saga his brother, Egil the archer, is present to help him to make his wings and to help Velent escape). However, the rest of the story is different. It tells of how Wayland was the son of a giant named Wade (Old Norse: Vadi), and how he was taught to smith by two dwarfs. It also tells of how he came to be with King Niðung, crossing the sea in a hollow log, and how he forged the sword Mimung as part of a bet with the king's smith. And it also tells about the argument that led to Niðung's hamstringing of Wayland, and ultimately to Wayland's revenge: Niðung had promised to give Wayland his daughter in marriage and also half his kingdom, and then went back on this promise.

The saga elaborates on the flying contraption he builds using feathers collected by Egil; the contraption was called the flygil which suggests it was a pair of wings (German: Flügel) in the original German version, but conceived of as a fjaðrhamr (feather cloak) by the saga-writers. Wayland here also wears a blood-filled bladder as a prop, instructing Egil to aim his arrow at this bag, thus feigning injury and deceiving the king.

The saga also tells of the birth of a son, Wideke (Old Norse: Viðga), to Wayland and Niðung's daughter. While he was still in captivity, the couple have a conversation, and they vow to each other love; the smith also reveals that he has fashioned a weapon and hidden it in the forge for his unborn son. He settles in his native Sjoland and eventually marries the princess with the blessing of her brother who became the next king after Niðung's death.

This son inherits the sword Mimung, and goes on to become one of Þidrek/Didrik's warriors.

==== Other ====
In Icelandic manuscripts from the fourteenth century onwards, the terms Labyrinth and Domus Daedali ('home of Daedalus') are rendered Vǫlundarhús ('house of Vǫlundr'). This shows that Völundr was seen as equivalent to, or even identical with, the classical hero Daedalus.

In Þorsteins saga Víkingssonar, Völundr is the manufacturer of the magic sword Gram (also named Balmung and Nothung) and the magic ring that Þorsteinn retrieves.

=== English ===
==== Visual ====
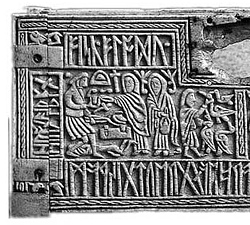
The smith Wayland from the front of the eighth-century Northumbrian Franks Casket in the British Museum.

The Franks Casket is one of a number of other early English references to Wayland, whose story was evidently well known and popular, although no extended version in Old English has survived. In the front panel of the Franks Casket, incongruously paired with an Adoration of the Magi, Wayland stands at the extreme left in the forge where he is held as a slave by King Niðhad, who has had his hamstrings cut to hobble him. Below the forge is the headless body of Niðhad's son, whom Wayland has killed, making a goblet from his skull; his head is probably the object held in the tongs in Wayland's hand. With his other hand Wayland offers the goblet to Böðvildr, Niðhad's daughter. Another female figure is shown in the centre; perhaps Wayland's helper, brother Egil, or Böðvildr again. To the right of the scene his brother catches birds, from whose feathers he makes wings with which he escapes.

During the Viking Age in northern England, Wayland is depicted in his smithy, surrounded by his tools, at Halton, Lancashire, and fleeing from his royal captor by clinging to a flying bird, on a cross at Leeds Minster, West Yorkshire, and stone carvings at Sherburn, North Yorkshire and Bedale, also in North Yorkshire.

English local tradition placed Wayland's forge in a Neolithic long barrow mound known as Wayland's Smithy, close to the Uffington White Horse in Oxfordshire. If a horse to be shod, or any broken tool, were left with a sixpenny piece at the entrance of the barrow the repairs would be executed.

==== Textual ====
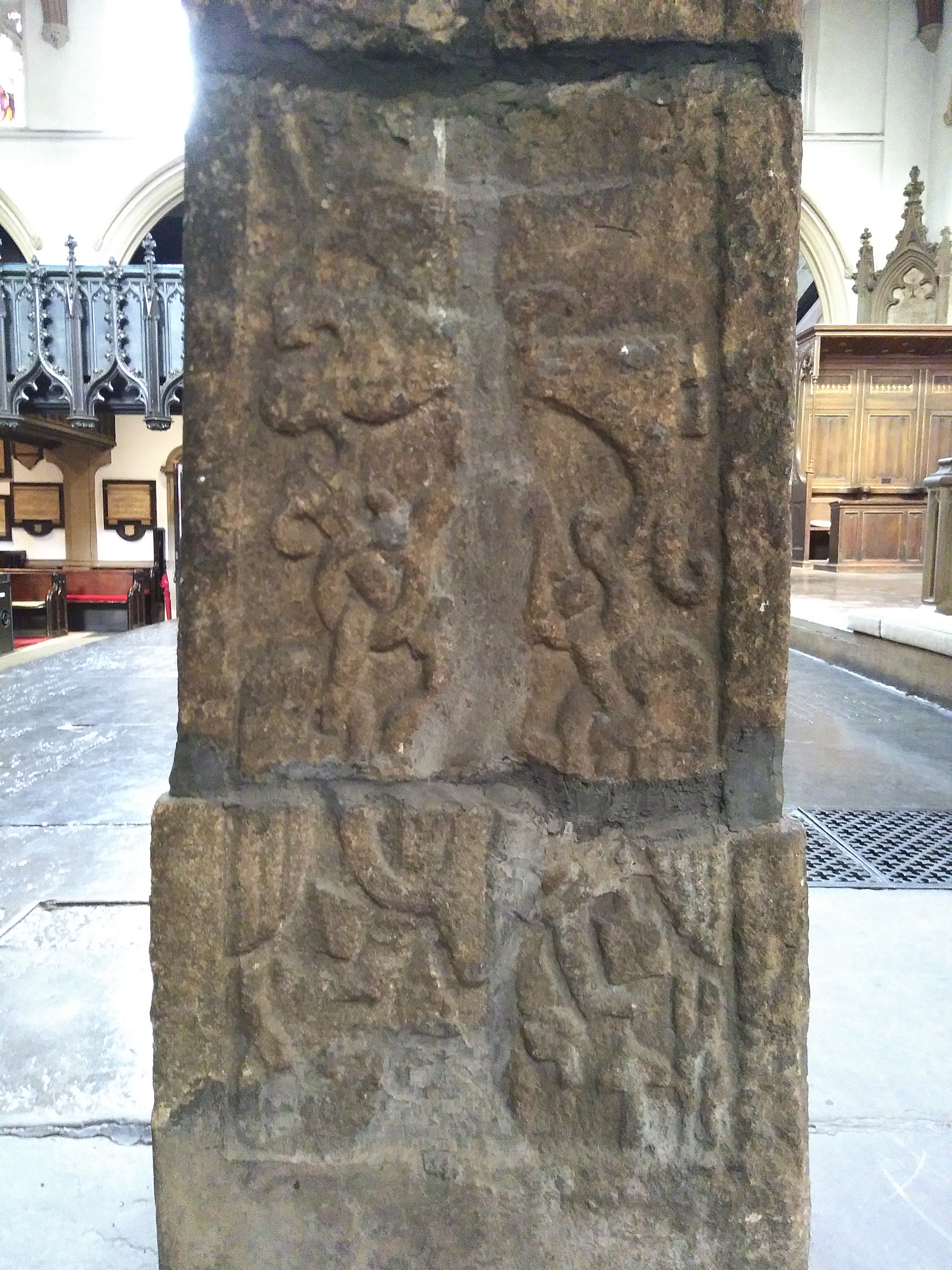
Panel Civ (south face, lowest panel) of the c. tenth-century Leeds Cross found in Leeds Minster, depicting Wayland (below) holding Beaduhild/Bǫðvildr above his head, at a right angle. Wayland's head has been lost, but his wings are visible to the left and right, and his tools at the bottom of the panel.

The Old English poem Deor, which recounts the famous sufferings of various figures before turning to those of Deor, its author, begins with "Welund":

Welund tasted misery among snakes.
The stout-hearted hero endured troubles
had sorrow and longing as his companions
cruelty cold as winter - he often found woe
Once Nithad laid restraints on him,
supple sinew-bonds on the better man.
That went by; so can this.

To Beadohilde, her brothers' death was not
so painful to her heart as her own problem
which she had readily perceived
that she was pregnant; nor could she ever
foresee without fear how things would turn out.
That went by, so can this.

Weland had fashioned the mail shirt worn by Beowulf according to lines 450–455 of the epic poem of the same name:

No need then
to lament for long or lay out my body.
If the battle takes me, send back
this breast-webbing that Weland fashioned
and Hrethel gave me, to Lord Hygelac.
Fate goes ever as fate must.

— (Heaney trans.)

The reference in Waldere is similar to that in Beowulf – the hero's sword was made by Weland – while Alfred the Great in his translation of Boethius asks plaintively: "What now are the bones of Wayland, the goldsmith preeminently wise?"

Swords fashioned by Wayland are regular properties of medieval romance. King Rhydderch Hael gave one to Merlin, and Rimenhild made a similar gift to Child Horn. English literature was also aware of the character Wade, whose name is similar to that of Vaði, the father of Wayland in Þiðreks saga.

=== Continental Germanic ===
Wayland is known by the name Wieland in line 965 of the Latin epic Waltharius, a literary composition based on Old High German oral tradition, as the smith who made the poem's eponymous protagonist's armor:

Et nisi duratis Wielandia fabrica giris
Obstaret, spisso penetraverit ilia ligno.

Translation:

And had not Weland's work obstructed with hardened rings,
He would have pierced his guts with the tough wood.

== Toponyms and folklore ==
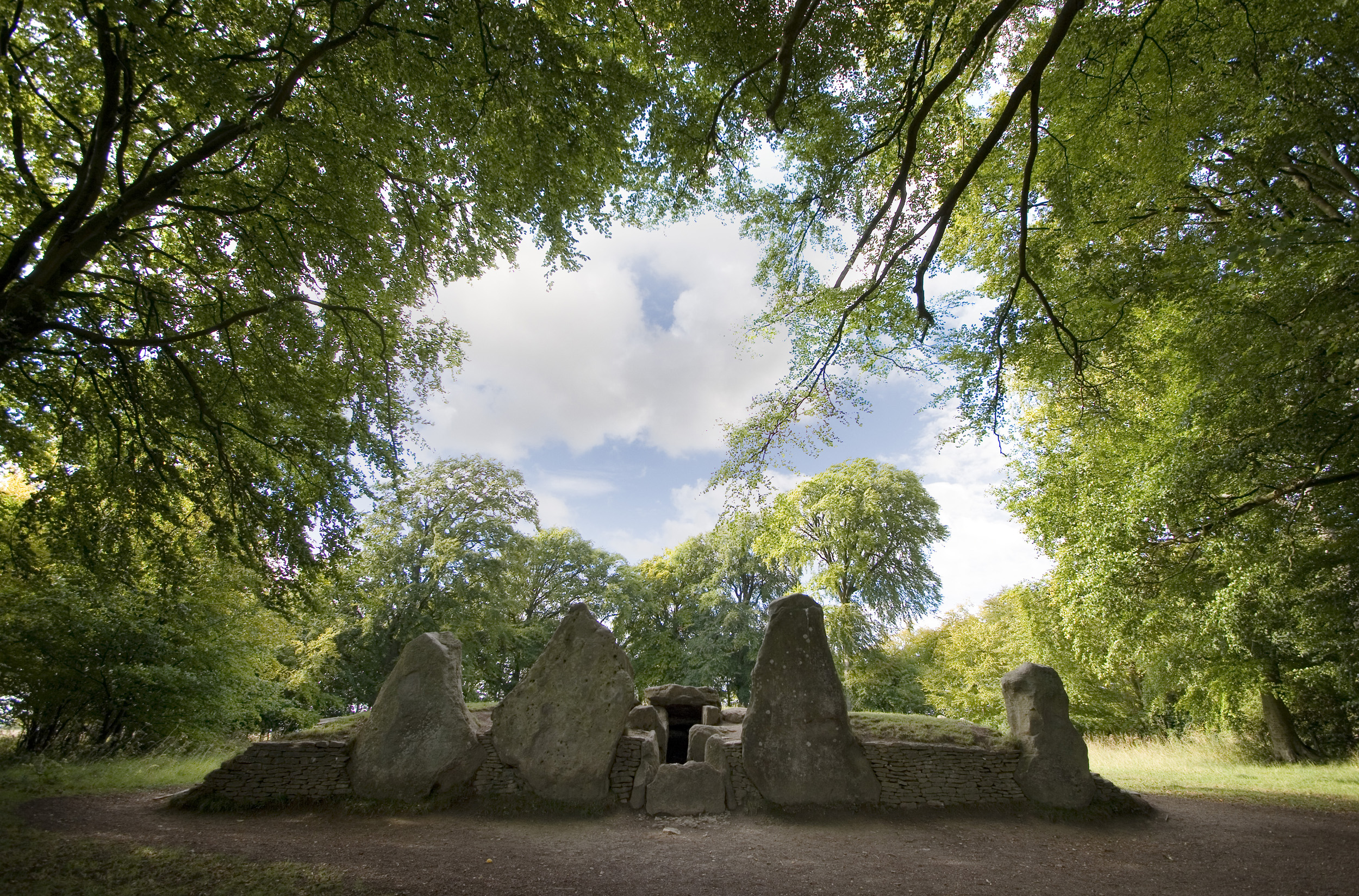
The entrance to the Neolithic long barrow of Wayland's Smithy

Wayland is associated with Wayland's Smithy, a burial mound in the Berkshire Downs. This was named by the English, but the megalithic mound significantly predates them. It is from this association that the folk belief came about that a horse left there overnight with a small silver coin (groat) would be shod by morning.

This belief is mentioned in the first episode of Puck of Pook's Hill by Rudyard Kipling, "Weland's Sword", which narrates the rise and fall of the god.

== In modern culture ==
Sir Walter Scott includes Wayland Smith as a character in his novel Kenilworth set in 1575.

Rudyard Kipling's first three stories in Puck of Pook's Hill feature a sword made by Wayland Smith in the first of them.

In the 1978 BBC TV series The Moon Stallion, the character of the Green King (played by Michael Kilgarriff) states that he is also known as Wayland the Smith.

In the ITV series Robin of Sherwood, Wayland the Smith was credited for creating seven swords charged with "the Power of Light and Darkness".

”Morax, Solas, Orias, Albion, Elidor, Beleth, Flauros. On each of them, words of high magic unspoken since they were made. Wayland knew the danger. Oh yes, he knew. That’s why he scattered them, and for hundreds of years they remained apart. Two of them were buried. Others lost in battle, and some so cunningly hidden that none had knowledge of them, except the Cauldron of Lucifer. They knew. The search took many years, many lives.” — Morgwyn of Ravenscar

Of the seven, the protagonist Robin of Loxley is given Albion by Herne the Hunter at the beginning of the series.

In Gene Wolfe's book The Wizard Knight, Weland the smith was the forger of the sword Eterne, which forms a central part of the novel's plot.

In the Rivers of London book series, the Sons of Weyland are a modern day magical blacksmithing society responsible for creation of magical artefacts in the United Kingdom.

Joanna Eden's 2026 novel The Wind Road, a mythical reimagining of the Gresford disaster, is based on the legend of Weyland the Smith.

== See also ==
- Culture of Närke
- Deor
- Flibbertigibbet
- Gobannus
- Goibniu
- Ilmarinen
- Kāve
- Kenilworth
- Kurdalægon
- Sigurd
- Tlepsh
- Widia
- Wieland der Schmied
- Velents þáttr smiðs
- Vulcan (mythology)
- Wieland der Schmied (Hitler)
