= Bathilde =

Bathilde is a Germanic given name, with variants as Bathilda, Balthild, Bathildis' or Böðvildr. It may refer to:

== Persons ==
- Böðvildr, Germanic legendary character
- Balthild of Chelles (c. 626–680), Merovingian queen
- Bathilde d'Orléans (1750–1822), French princess
- Bathilda Bagshot, fictional character from the Harry Potter universe
- Bathilde (character), fictional character from the ballet Giselle
- Princess Bathildis of Anhalt-Dessau (1837–1902), wife of Prince William of Schaumburg-Lippe
- Princess Bathildis of Schaumburg-Lippe (1873–1962), consort of Friedrich, Prince of Waldeck and Prymont, daughter of the above

== Animals ==
- Bathilda, a genus of birds
