= Slagfiðr =

One of a trio of brothers along with Völundr and Egil

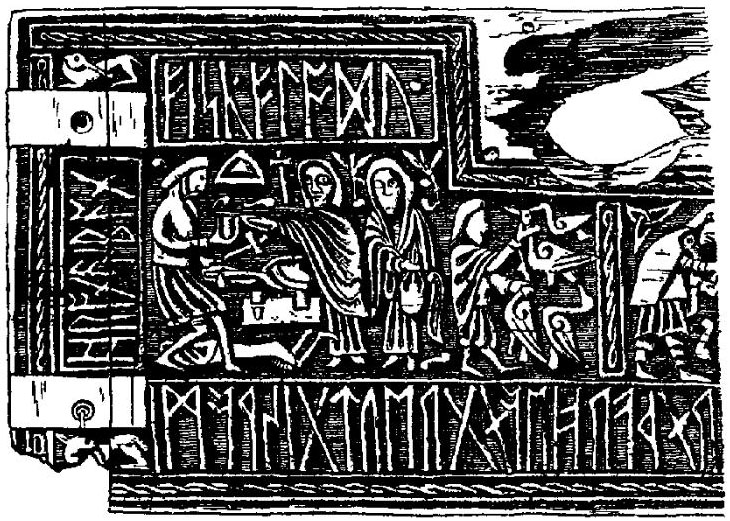
Drawing of a portion of Franks Casket relevant to the tale of Wayland the Smith, showing Völundr holding with a pair of tongs the skull of one of Níþoþr's children, which he is fashioning into a goblet. The boy's body lies at his feet. Böðvildr and her attendant also appear, and Egil, who in one version made Völundr's wings, is depicted in the act of catching birds.

In Norse mythology, Slagfiðr (Old Norse "beating-Finn") is one of a trio of brothers along with Völundr and Egil. In the Poetic Edda poem Völundarkviða, Slagfiðr is attested as the seven-year husband of the valkyrie Hlaðguðr svanhvít.
