= Deor =

Old English poem

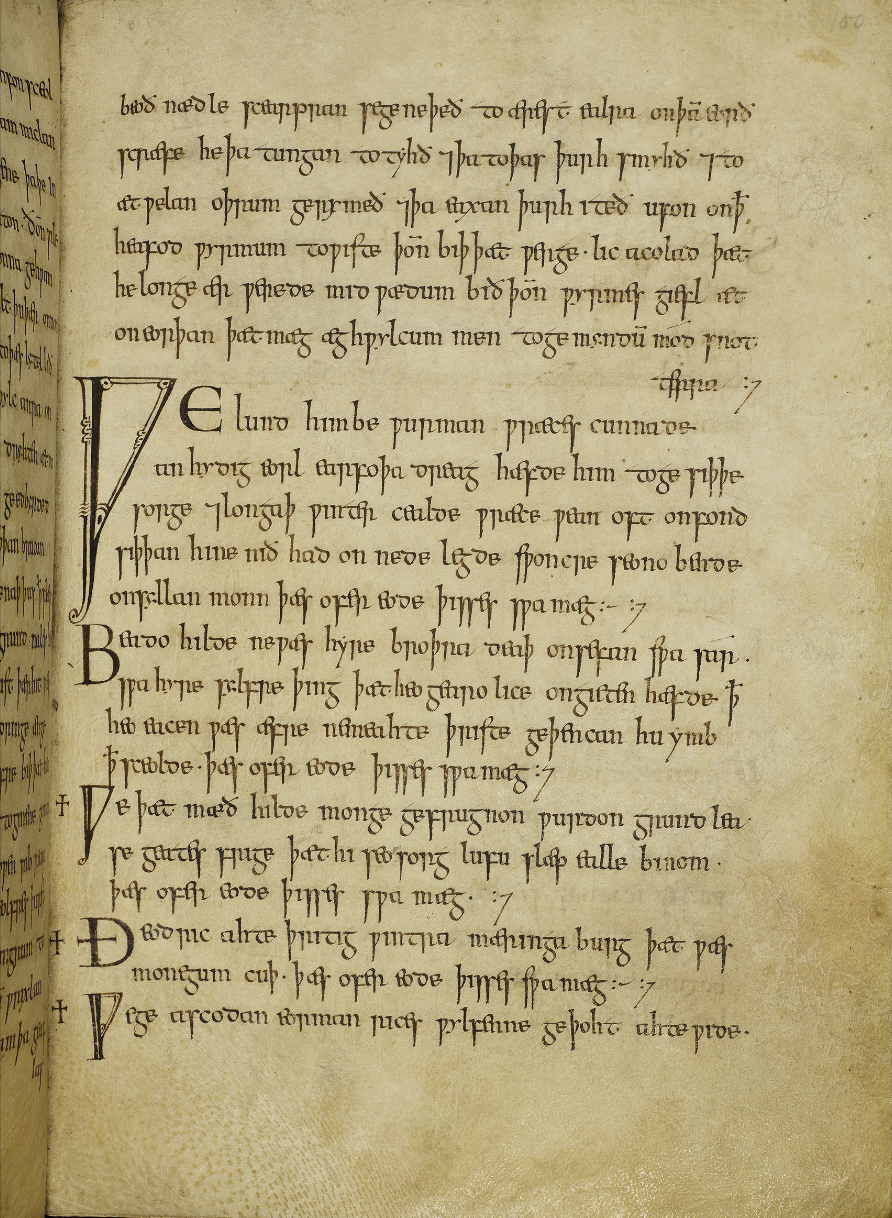
- The first stanzas of "Deor" in the Exeter Book (beginning with the stylised letter about a third down the page)
- Language: Old English
- Date: 9th or 10th century
- Manuscript(s): Exeter Book
- Genre: Elegy; consolatio; satire (possibly)
- Length: 42 lines
- Subject: Perseverance and consolation
- Personages: Welund; Niðhad; Beadohilde; Geat; Mæðhilde; Ðeodric; Ermanaric
- Text: Deor at Wikisource

"Deor" (/ˈdeɪɔːr/ DAY-or; Old English: [deo̯ːr]) (Note: Also known as the Scaldic Poem, "Deor the Scald's Complaint", "Deor's Complaint", "Lament of Deor", "The Song of Deor", "'A Verse of Patience", or "How Deor, the Poet, Comforted Himself".) is an Old English poem found in the 10th-century Exeter Book. Most of the poem comprises several vignettes about tragedies befalling different legendary figures in Germanic mythology, each ending with a refrain on the transience of hardship. At the end, the poet reveals that he has fallen into a period of hardship himself; he too concludes that his own misfortune will pass. The moral of the poem is generally thought to be that undergoing hardship is inevitable, but that comfort can be found in knowing that it will pass.

The poem is composed of 42 lines sectioned into six unequal stanzas or strophes, a rarity among Old English poems. Scholars are split on what genre of poetry "Deor" belongs to, but it is generally considered an elegy and routinely linked to the works of Boethius as a consolatio. Some of the poem's Germanic allusions are a matter of substantial debate. Scholars have long argued whether the titular "Deor" is the poet's real name. Nothing is known for certain about who the characters Geat and Mæðhilde are supposed to represent; they may be references to either the traditional Scandinavian tale Harpans kraft ('The Power of the Harp') or the Old Norse poem Hávamál, though other theories have been proposed as well. Beside the narrator, each of the characters appears to have a relationship to the Goths, though it is unclear why they are so salient in the poem's narrative.

The use of language in "Deor" is also the subject of scholarly interest. The poem's refrain employs a particularly unusual form of the genitive case, which linguists have argued over the meaning and grammatical structure of. Several words in the poem are also of unclear meaning and may serve to link certain vignettes to different references in Germanic mythology depending on their interpretation. The role of grammatical tense in the poem has likewise served to argue against the idea that the narrator's name is "Deor". Several words appear to have been misspelled, though scholars debate whether these were textual errors, such as dittographies, or whether they signal another properly understood word entirely.

== Synopsis ==
The poem describes several vignettes of tragedy and ends each with a reminder that those difficulties eventually passed. It begins with a vignette about Welund, a legendary blacksmith, who undergoes several agonising ordeals due to the evil king Niðhad. Beadohilde's brothers have been killed and she worries what will become of her and her child after she discovers she is pregnant. (Note: See § Welund and Beadohilde) Something happens to Mæðhilde and Geat, which leads to sleeplessness. (Note: See § Geat and Mæðhilde) Ðeodric ruled over the burg (a fortified town) of the Mærings for thirty years but no longer does. Eormanric ruled the Goths with an iron fist and their warriors hoped that his administration would be destroyed.

The poem then reflects on sorrow. The narrator reveals that his name was Deor and that he was once the scop (a kind of Germanic bard) for the Heodenings, a heroic group of legendary warriors who fight a never-ending battle. Though loved by his lord, he was replaced by another skilful scop named Heorrenda, who has taken his estate and titles. Reflecting on his current condition, the narrator concludes that his situation too shall pass.

== Composition ==
"Deor" was written in Old English, a mediaeval West Germanic language from which modern English is descended. The poem dates to the 9th or 10th century and is found in the Exeter Book, a large codex of Old English poetry compiled in the 10th century. The poem itself is relatively short, composed of only 42 lines and is notable for its inclusion of a refrain, which is rare in Old English poetry. Similarly unusual is the poem's division into six unequal stanzas or strophes. (Note: North (1988) describes the stanzas in "Deor" as "a unique phenomenon in The Exeter Book", though Fjalldal (1991) points out that "Wulf and Eadwacer" also is stanzaic.) It is not clear if the original order of the stanzas is reflected in the Exeter Book version nor if other sections of the poem have been lost. Several scholars, including Kemp Malone and P. J. Frankis, have described the stanzas as being untethered to one another existing as "isolated aspect[s] of human relationships and misfortune", though modern scholarship has challenged this view. The poem's moral is generally thought to be that hardship is inevitable, but one can take some comfort in knowing that it will pass.

== Analysis ==
=== Genre ===
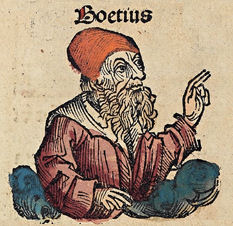
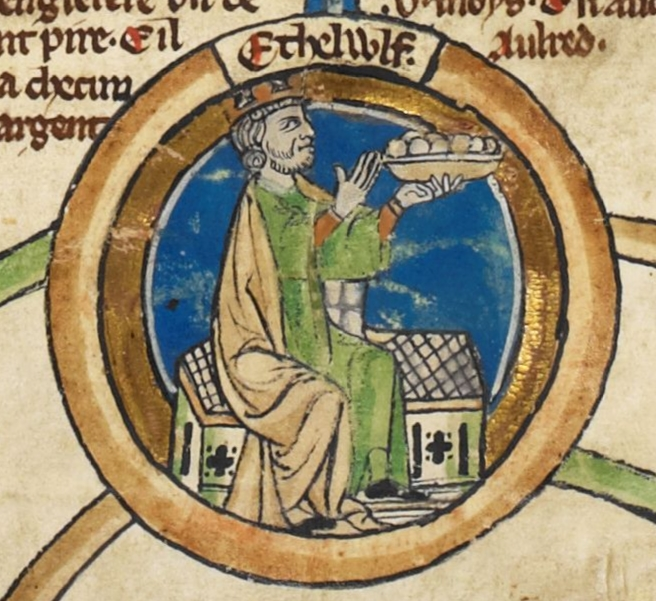
Boethius (left) is commonly attributed as a major inspiration for "Deor", though the poem may also be a satire of Æthelwulf, King of Wessex.

The genre of poetry that "Deor" belongs to has been the subject of some debate. It is typically categorised in the Exeter Book as one of the elegies, which also include the poems "The Wanderer, "The Seafarer", "The Wife's Lament", "The Husband's Message", "The Ruin", and "Wulf and Eadwacer". (Note: "Resignation B" is sometimes also included; "Wulf and Eadwacer" is sometimes excluded.) These are defined by their focus on the transience of the physical world and personal loss, often containing consolatory Christian themes. The mediaevalist Richard North suggests that the poem was originally composed around the year 856 as a satire of Æthelwulf, King of Wessex. Given the prominence of Germanic mythology, the poem is sometimes categorized with other Germanic heroic poetry rather than the elegies, even though its content contains Christian themes. Other scholars, such as the Swiss philologist Andreas Heusler, have suggested that the poem has no genre at all.

==== Relationship to Boethius ====
"Deor" is often connected to the works of Boethius, particularly his On the Consolation of Philosophy. This connection was first made by the American philologist W. W. Lawrence in 1911, who described the work as a "Consolatio Philosophiae of minstrelsy", and more scholars began to seriously consider the relationship of the poem to the works of Boethius in the late 1960s and 1970s. The most common reading of the poem is overall optimistic and the poem is thus considered a kind of consolatio, or consolatory poem, in the vein of Boethius's work. Some scholars, such as R. D. Fulk and Christopher M. Cain, have challenged this reading, arguing that the poem "seems more naturally to express the grim admiration of sublime suffering so characteristic of heroic poetry".

=== Characters ===
The author of the poem makes several allusions to figures who appear to have been well-known to the intended readership, but several of the figures in the poem have been lost to history. Other than the narrator himself, each of the characters appears to have a relationship to the Goths, though it is unclear why the Goths play such a prominent role in the poem. Peter Heather suggests that a copy of Getica, a history of the Goths by Jordanes, was "in circulation" in England during the 9th century, which may have influenced the content of both "Deor" and "Widsith", another poem found in the Exeter Book.

==== Welund and Beadohilde ====
In the original legend of Welund, Niðhad was jealous of Welund's skill and magically enslaves him. Welund exacts his revenge by decapitating Niðhad's two sons. He tricks Niðhad into drinking from his sons' skulls and makes jewellery out of their eyes for the queen. Welund then drugs Niðhad's daughter Beadohilde with tainted beer, then rapes and impregnates her. These acts break Welund free from the spell that Niðhad placed on him and he flies away in a feathered suit. The version of the story told in Þiðreks saga instead presents Welund and Beadohilde as having fallen in love, though the consensuality of their sex remains ambiguous. In the poem "Waldere", Welund and Beadohilde's son is identified as Widia, who befriends prince Dietrich von Bern (Ðeodric). In Þiðreks saga, Widia also becomes Ðeodric's trusted ally in battle. Lorden links the first two stanzas about Welund and Beadohilde to the fourth and fifth through their son's relationship to Ðeodric even though Widia's name does not appear in "Deor" at all.

==== Ðeodric and Eormanric ====
"Ðeodric" is usually understood to be Theodoric the Great, ruler of the Ostrogothic Kingdom, who was later mythologised as the hero Dietrich von Bern. Though the mediaevalist Kemp Malone interpreted the figure as Theoderic the Frank, this position is no longer widely held. There appear to be parallels between the reference in "Deor" to the Mæringa burg and the Old Norse reference to Þjóðrekr hinn þormóði ('Theodoric the Great'; literally 'Þjóðrekr the Bold') who is called skati Mæringa ('prince of the Mærings') found on the Rök runestone, which suggests Theodoric the Great is the subject in "Deor" as well.

Eormanric (Gothic: *𐌰𐌹𐍂𐌼𐌰𐌽𐌰𐍂𐌴𐌹𐌺𐍃, *Airmanareiks) was king of the Goths and is thought to have committed suicide in 375 as the Huns prepared to invade his kingdom. It is likely that some of the legendary attributes of Eormanric are due to contamination with the stories of the later Gothic king Odoacer. In Þiðreks saga, Widia's success leads Ðeodric to place his services under Eormanric and arrange Widia's marriage to a widow in Eormanric's family. Eormanric is then tricked by his retainer into killing his own kinsman, including Widia's stepchildren. Widia ultimately forgives Eormanric, but a rift forms between Eormanric and Ðeodric. A battle ensues and although Widia attempts to warn Ðeodric of the coming conflict, he is too late and as a result of his being placed under Eormanric's service, Widia is forced to fight Ðeodric's forces. Ðeodric drives Widia into a lake, causing him to disappear. Ultimately, Ðeodric is able to regain control of the kingdom.

The Germanic literature scholar Marijane Osborn notes that both Gothic kings, Ðeodric and Eormanric, are framed as oppressors rather than victims. Frankis agrees, arguing that Theodoric the Great's dishonorable killing of Odoacer would have been remembered by some of the intended readership. Jennifer Lorden disagrees, arguing that the author does not view Ðeodric as an evil king, but rather sympathetically in light of Eormanric's betrayal of Ðeodric over his wealth and power. For her, Ðeodric's thirty-year rule before being deposed by Eormanric aligns with the story as told in the Þiðreks saga. "Deor" presents Eormanric's rule as despotic, but several scholars such as Malone and Lorden have cast doubt as to whether the author aims to make the same claims about Ðeodric's rule. Both "Widsith" and "Waldere" appear to have a positive view of Theordoric; however, if the poem is indeed influenced by Boethius, his persecution by Theodoric may signify a negative view. To the same end, the use of the word overgan ('to pass over') in the refrain seems to indicate overcoming misfortune.

==== Geat and Mæðhilde ====
Geat and Mæðhilde may be references to Gaute and Magnild, the two main characters from a Scandinavian tale known as Harpans kraft ('The Power of the Harp').

Nothing is known for certain about who Geat and Mæðhilde were. In the manuscript, Mæðhilde appears to be rendered as two separate words, as mæð hilde; Beadohilde is likewise rendered as beado hilde. Early translations attempted to view these as separate words; J. J. Conybeare translated the term as 'reward of a contest', while Wilhelm Grimm translated the whole line as 'This fate, many a battle we have heard'. Benjamin Thorpe was the first to consider Mæðhilde a personal name, followed by Malone's interpretation of Geat as a first name decades later.

The meaning of the vignette may also rely on the terms monge and frige, which are of uncertain meaning. The term monge is generally considered a dittography of *mone ('moans', plural noun), given that the following word gefrugnon also begins with ge-. Other interpretations include that the term is a version of monige ('many') as short for 'many of us have heard', though the grammar is difficult to square; that it is a variant of gemang ('sexual intercourse'); or that it is related to the term mong (lit. 'commerce', compare monger), with a metaphorical extension as an affair. The term frige is usually interpreted as 'passion', though Malone believed it was an unattested genitive singular form of freo ('lady'). Other Old English poems use the phrase weres frige ('male sexuality'; lit. 'passion of a man'), which supports the former sense.

Malone links the two to Scandinavian tales of Gaute and Magnild, (Note: Also called Gauti and Magnhild in the Icelandic kvæði.) one form of the Harpans kraft ('The Power of the Harp') tale, which has garnered acceptance. In a Norwegian version of the story, Gaute and Magnild are betrothed, but Magnild worries about dying in the Vending River. Gaute promises to build a strong bridge, but this does not comfort Magnild. While on their way home, Gaute and his retinue chase a deer, leaving Magnild behind. When they return, Magnild has been taken by a water demon into the river, but Gaute plays his harp so strongly that the water pushes Magnild and her horse out despite the water demon's magic attempts to steal her back. She survives in this Norwegian tale, but dies in a similar version from Iceland. Some critics have argued against this position. Gaute and Magnild are not the only names used for the story and are potentially later names for the characters therein, provided the reference in "Deor" is indeed a reference to this Scandinavian tale, which is not clear.

Another suggestion is that Geat and Mæðhilde are actually references to Niðhad and Beadohilde. Under this interpretation, the term Geat is a reference to the Geats, a Germanic people of southern Scandinavia, as a racial epithet for Niðhad. The separation of the name into mæð hilde has led some scholars such as Frederick Tupper and C. W. M. Grein to translate the Old English mæð hilde as 'the violation of Hild', referring to Beadohilde's rape by Welund, based on a believed connection to the Old Icelandic term meiða ('to injure'). The poem's reference to sleeplessness is thus interpreted as Niðhad's inability to sleep as he grieves his daughter's rape and his sons' deaths. Svetislav Stefanović suggested that the use of mæð in this sense may signal a potential relationship to the myth of Odin and his incestuous relationship with his valkyrie daughter Hildr. Both of these positions have been rejected, as the connection between the Old English and Old Icelandic terms is now considered unlikely.

J. R. J. North links Geat and Mæðhilde to part of the Old Icelandic poem Hávamál where an unnamed maid tricks Odin into staying up all night for sex. Odin waits all evening lying in wait in a lake and, when he finally enters her room after sneaking past her sleeping guards, she is nowhere to be found and a bitch is tied to the end of the bed to mock him. North notes that, "cynical as it may be", the story in Hávamál is a warning to the reader about the costs of being complacent. He suggests that Geat and Mæðhilde in "Deor" may be references to an Anglo-Saxon variant of Hávamál, serving to highlight the need for detachment during hardship by contrasting the discomfort of the detached Geat against the agony endured by the other characters.

Anglo-Saxon royal genealogies list Geat and Woden (the Anglo-Saxon form of Odin) as the euhemerised, legendary progenitors of the English royal lines; Geat is listed in the Anglo-Saxon Chronicle as five generations before Woden and as an ancestor of Ida of Bernicia, who ruled over Northumbria. In Norse traditions found in Iceland and Norway, however, the equivalent forms – Gautr and Óðinn, respectively – are treated synonymously, both referring to Odin. In Grímnismál, Óðinn names himself Gautr, and in Baldrs draumr, gautr is used at least twice to refer to Óðinn. North thereby considers Geat to be connected to the story of Odin in Hávamál. He reconstructs the story as Mæðhilde entices Geat into a secret affair (mong) at a specified time and place to create a new royal line of kings. However, when the night comes, Mæðhilde evades Geat and his sexual energy goes unfulfilled, depriving him of sleep. North suggests that the two following vignettes about Gothic rulers may also serve to imply that Geat found another consort and established a lineage of Gothic kings.

==== Narrator ====
The name of the poet is traditionally identified as "Deor", though modern scholars have disputed this reading.

Scholars have questioned whether the narrator's name really is "Deor", as the author describes the name in the past tense form: me wæs Deor noma ('my name was Deor'). The author identifies himself as the scop Deor, but this character does not appear in any other known work of Germanic literature even though both the Heodenings and Heorrenda appear in other works of Germanic and Icelandic mythology. Anglo-Saxon records from the period do contain the given name Deor, though there is no evidence of poets losing or changing their names in any mediaeval Germanic culture and Anglo-Saxon poets are generally nameless. Introductions in Old English literature are relatively abundant and virtually always use the present tense as in Ic eom Higelaces mæg ond magoðegn ('I am Higelac's kinsman and thane') or Beowulf is min nama ('Beowulf is my name'). One exception is the sword Hrunting, which is nicknamed in the past tense in Beowulf, but this is because Beowulf discards it after it fails to wound Grendel's mother. Thus, the sword is considered in the past tense because it presumably no longer exists.

One suggestion is that "Deor" was a title given to the Heodenings' scop and the narrator lost the title to Heorrenda, who assumed the title. This interpretation does not appear to be substantiated by other sources and has been mostly rejected by scholars. W. W. Lawrence suggested that "Deor" was a nickname given to the poet by the Heodenings. This is supported by the fact that some Old Norse documents attest to court poet nicknames, though critics argue that there is no evidence of a poet losing their nickname under any circumstances. Another possibility is that the name is a parabolic way of revealing the name of the author. The word deor was Old English for 'animal' and may have stood for the given name "Wulf" (lit. 'wolf'), while its capitalisation serves to indicate that it is indeed a name. The English scholar of mediaeval literature P. J. Frankis suggests that "Deor" and "Wulf and Eadwacer" are two monologues contained in the same heroic narrative, though this is considered mostly conjecture, including by Frankis himself.

Some scholars, such as C. L. Wrenn and Magnús Fjalldal, suggest that deor should be read in the adjectival sense meaning 'noble' or 'valued'; this adjective sense with the meaning 'valued' was usually spelt deore, though the loss of the final vowel with this sense is attested in the literature. Fjalldal suggests that the line me wæs Deor noma should be understood as 'my name [as a poet] was noble/valued'. Wrenn still considers it a name, however, while Fjalldal considers it only an adjective and suggests that the fact that the poet's name is unknown but his successor is named deepens the tragedy of the poem overall. Osborn agrees with the position that the name is an adjective, but treats the name as a pun about his former value.

=== Use of language ===
==== Genitive case ====
The poem employs a particularly strange use of the genitive case in its refrain Þæs ofereode, þisses swa mæg. The line has been translated over a hundred different ways and disagreement persists among linguists as to how to parse the line itself. The line is often translated as 'that passed away, so may this'. (Note: Other translations include: 'That passed away, so can this.'; 'That passed over, so can this.'; 'That passed over, so may this.'; 'He got through much of that, maybe we will too.'; 'That passed and so will this.') In the refrain, both þæs ('of that') and þisses ('of this') are genitive forms and the attested Old English data shows no other use of the verb ofergan with a genitive noun phrase.

Traditionally, scholars of Anglo-Saxon England have considered the use of the genitive as the result of the impersonal usage of ofergan ('to pass', lit. 'to go over') being used in conjunction with an adverbial use of the genitive noun phrase. Evidence for this position is found with verbs like faran ('to travel'), gangan ('to go'), and wendan ('to wend'), which are all found with similar genitive constructions and have a similar semantic meaning to ofergan. However, it is not clear that the verb is being used impersonally and the attested genitive constructions with the other verbs are rare.

Another possible parsing is to employ "body deletion", where the governing node is deleted as a result of metonymy. For example, in the sentence "Max is heavy", the name "Max" alone can be viewed as a stand-in for the modern English genitive construction "Max's body". This view, however, has been rejected as a "highly eccentric, potentially circular, and ad hoc grammatical analysis" and several of the original proposers' logic delves into the subjective nature of poetry as opposed to grammatical parsing.

A more likely explanation is that the genitive pronouns related to pro-dropping, where the subject of a sentence could be omitted if it could be inferred from context. This was common in Old English constructions and has been used to explain both genitive forms. This explanation considers the subject of each vignette as the presumed subject, as in the following:

[X] þæs ofereode, þisses swa mæg [Y]
[null] that.GEN pass.PST this.GEN so may [null]
'X overcame that, and may Y overcome this also.'

This position appears to be defensible both from synchronic and diachronic perspectives. J. R. J. North argues that holding back the governing subject of þisses increases the suspense for the reader by obfuscating his own hardship until the end.

==== Be wurman ====
The phrase be wurman has traditionally been thought to describe the ornamentation of Anglo-Saxon weaponry.

The phrase be wurman has also puzzled scholars. Traditionally, wurman has been translated as the plural dative of 'worm' (though it could also mean 'serpent' or 'dragon'), referring to ornate serpentine decorations such as those found on swords of the period or other pieces of metalwork such as bracelets or armbands. In this context, the term be is interpreted as a locative to signify that Welund is "among" his metalworks, though the expected preposition here would have been mid. The expected form of the Old English word for 'worm' in this context, too, is problematic; the dative plural in this context should be wyrmum. It is also possible that the term is an alternative form or misspelling of wearnum, referencing the fetters Niðhad had placed on Welund.

Another proposal suggests that Wurman is actually a proper noun that refers to the modern-day German city of Worms, formerly a Burgundian stronghold. This proposal aligns the be with the similar German-language construction bei Worms ('by Worms'). There is some evidence to suggest that the origin of the Welund myth was in the area around Worms and similar Germanic tales such as the Old English poem "Waldere" and the Medieval Latin epic Waltharius show similar features. Earlier scholarship also considered Värmland, an area in western Sweden, as a potential translation of wurman. Others such as Bruce Dickens have suggested that the name is "a blundered place or tribal name"; Theodor von Greinberger considers it a tribal name without reservation, though critics point again to the fact that mid would be a more appropriate preposition than be. Osborn considers the preposition a signal that Welund suffered near Worms, not in it.

== See also ==
- Waldere – Old English epic poem
- Waltharius – Latin epic poem
