= Gringolet =

Sir Gawain's horse from Arthurian legend

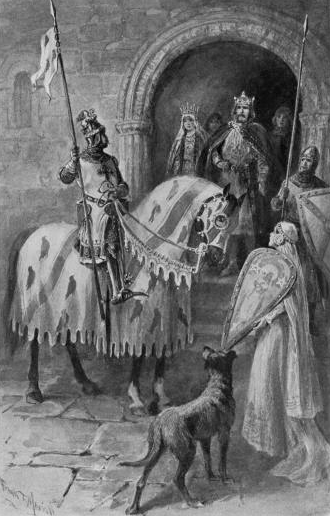
Gawain on his horse in A Knight of Arthur's Court or the Tale of Sir Gawain and the Green Knight (1910)

In Arthurian legend, Gringolet is Sir Gawain's powerful war horse.

== Derivation of name ==
Israel Gollancz in the early 20th century suggested that Gringolet was derived from the giant Wade's magic boat, Guingelot or *Wingolet – one form of magical transport (horse) being substituted for an earlier one (boat). More generally accepted is the suggestion by the prominent Arthurian scholar Roger Sherman Loomis that the French name Gringalet derived from either the Welsh guin-calet ("white and hardy"), or keincaled ("handsome and hardy") – linked to a wider Celtic tradition of heroic white horses with red ears.

== Appearances ==
His earliest appearance is in Chrétien de Troyes' Erec and Enide; in that poem he is borrowed by Sir Kay to joust against Erec. Even Gringolet cannot prevent Kay from losing to the protagonist. In the Lancelot-Grail Cycle, Gawain wins Gringolet from the Saxon king Clarion; a different story of the acquisition is given in Wolfram von Eschenbach's Parzival, where the horse bears the mark of, and comes from the stable of, the Grail castle – part of the gradual displacement of Gawain by Percival and the story of the grail.

In the Middle English poem Sir Gawain and the Green Knight, Gawain sets out atop Gringolet in search of the Green Chapel. Lines 600–604 of the poem describe Gringolet's ornate appearance in being readied for the journey:

The bridle was embossed and bound with bright gold;
So were the furnishings of the fore-harness and the fine skirts.
The crupper and the caparison accorded with the saddle-bows,
And all was arrayed on red with nails of richest gold,
Which glittered and glanced like gleams of the sun.

== Gawain's attachment ==
Gawain is always shown as attached to Gringolet, caring for his horse, and talking to it as to a beloved pet or companion. When (in The Awntyrs off Arthure) Gringolet (here called "Grissell") is killed beneath him in combat, Gawain is seized with battle fury, and runs mad, his strength amplified, until nightfall.

== See also ==
- List of fictional horses
- Embarr
- Epona
- Oisin
- White horse (mythology)
