= Böðvildr =

Legendary Character

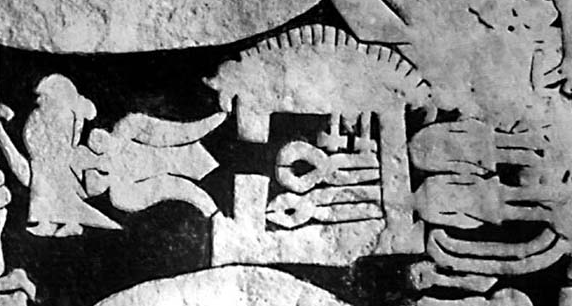
Böðvildr is walking away and her dead brothers are hidden to the right of the smithy. Between Böðvildr and the smithy, Wayland can be seen in an eagle fetch flying away. From the Ardre image stone VIII.

Böðvildr, Beadohild, Bodil or Badhild was a princess, the daughter of the evil king Níðuðr/Niðhad/Niðung who appears in Germanic legends, such as Deor, Völundarkviða and Þiðrekssaga. Initially, she appears to have been a tragic victim of Wayland the smith's revenge on her father, but in later Scandinavian versions, she becomes Wayland's wife and the mother of the hero Viðga of the Þiðrekssaga and medieval Scandinavian ballads.

The name can be etymologically reconstructed as Proto-Germanic *Badwōhildiz, with both elements ― *badwō and *hildiz ― meaning 'battle, fight'. Böðvildr therefore means something like 'battle‑maiden', 'warrior woman', or 'she who engages in battle'. It is suspected that the name is also cognate to that of the Germanic‑Celtic goddess Baudihillia, one of the Alaisiagae, who is mentioned in 2nd‑century epigraphic texts.

== Deor ==
Although preceded by the Ardre image stone, the oldest surviving textual source on her is the 10th century Anglo-Saxon poem Deor. It deals with the fact that Wayland has just murdered her brothers and raped her. It is suggested by the poet that things will turn out bad for her:

Welund him be wurman / wræces cunnade,
anhydig eorl / earfoþa dreag,
hæfde him to gesiþþe / sorge ond longaþ,
wintercealde wræce; / wean oft onfond,
siþþan hine Niðhad / on nede legde,
swoncre seonobende / on syllan monn.
Þæs ofereode, / þisses swa mæg!
-
Beadohilde ne wæs / hyre broþra deaþ
on sefan swa sar / swa hyre sylfre þing,
þæt heo gearolice / ongieten hæfde
þæt heo eacen wæs; / æfre ne meahte
þriste geþencan, / hu ymb þæt sceolde.
Þæs ofereode, / þisses swa mæg!

Translation:

Welund tasted misery among snakes.
The stout-hearted hero endured troubles
had sorrow and longing as his companions
cruelty cold as winter - he often found woe
Once Nithad laid restraints on him,
supple sinew-bonds on the better man.
That went by; so can this.
-
To Beadohilde, her brothers' death was not
so painful to her heart as her own problem
which she had readily perceived
that she was pregnant; nor could she ever
foresee without fear how things would turn out.
That went by, so can this.

== Völundarkviða ==
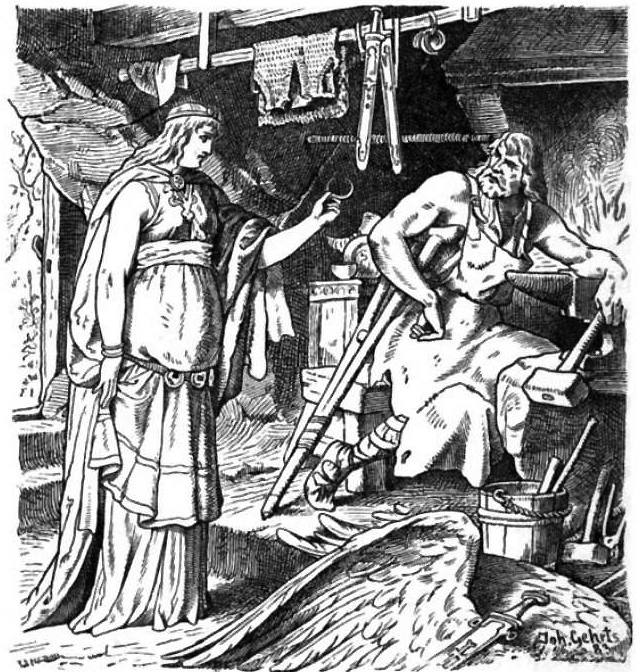
"Böðvildr in Weyland's Smithy" (1883) by Johannes Gehrts.

In Völundarkviða, she appears when her father Níðuðr has captured Wayland, and she receives from her father a gold ring that the smith had made for his lost Valkyrie lover. Wayland is hamstrung and put to work in her father's smithy.

Wayland has revenge by murdering her brothers and hiding them in the smithy. He then set their skulls in silver and sent them to the king together with jewelry for the queen made by the boys' eyes. For Böðvildr he made a brooch of the boys' teeth.

Böðvildr visited Wayland's smithy to ask him to mend a broken ring. Then, he raped her and flew away in a feather construction he had made, leaving her crying with shame:

Hlæjandi Völundr
hófsk at lofti,
grátandi Böðvildr
gekk ór eyju,
tregði för friðils
ok föður reiði.

Translation:

Laughing Völund
rose aloft,
Weeping Bothvild
went from the isle,
For her lover's flight
and her father's wrath.

Wayland, then flies to her father telling him of his revenge. The sorrow stricken king asks his thrall to go and fetch his daughter and Böðvildr has to tell her father the gruesome truth mirroring the tragedy told of in Deor:

41. "Satt er þat, Níðuðr,
er sagði þér:
Sátum vit Völundr
saman í holmi
eina ögurstund,
æva skyldi;
ek vætr hánum
vinna kunnak,
ek vætr hánum
vinna máttak."

Translation:

"True is it, Nithuth,
that which was told thee,
Once in the isle
with Völund was I,
An hour of lust,
alas it should be!
Nought was my might
with such a man,
Nor from his strength
could I save myself."

== Þiðrekssaga ==
The 13th century Þiðrekssaga has a fuller account in prose.

Wayland sailed to Denmark in a hollowed tree and eventually arrived to Jutland, where king Niðung was reigning. Wayland was soon challenged by Niðung's smith Amilias. Amilias forged a suit of armour and Wayland a sword, Mímung, with which he easily killed his rival. He thus gained great fame as a smith.

At the eve of a battle, Niðung found out that he had forgotten his victory stone and offered Böðvildr and half of his kingdom to the one who would get it before sunset. Wayland fetched the stone but, when he came back, the king's dróttseti (seneschal) asked for it. Wayland refused to give it up and killed the knight. Niðung banished him.

Later he tried to avenge himself by poisoning the king and Böðvildr but he got caught, was hamstrung and set to work in the forge. But he eventually killed Niðung's two younger sons in his smithy and made a whole set of tableware for the king with their bones. He also raped Böðvildr.

Wayland's brother Egill came at the court. He was a famous archer and Niðung challenged him to shoot an apple from the head of his son. He could shoot only one arrow, but took three. After he succeeded with his first arrow, the king asked him what the other two were for, and he explained that had he hit his son, he would have shot the king with the others.

Wayland asked his brother to collect feathers, with which he made himself wings. He flew to Niðung and revealed to him that he had killed his sons and made his daughter pregnant. He then flew away. Egill was ordered by the king to shoot him down. But Wayland had tied a bladder filled with blood under his arm. Egill hit it, thus deceiving the king, and Wayland returned to Zealand.

Niðung died shortly after and his son Otvin succeeded him. The princess gave birth to a son called Viðga. Wayland settled a peace agreement with Otvin and he married Böðvildr, as they both had agreed before his leaving.

== Toponyms ==
In England, a Burial Mound apparently existed on The Berkshire Downs, which according to local legend was Beadohilde's Barrow. The mound has now disappeared, but was excavated in 1850 when a jet ornament, a Kimmeridge ring and a bronze pin were recovered.
