= Leeds Cross =

Early medieval cross fragments

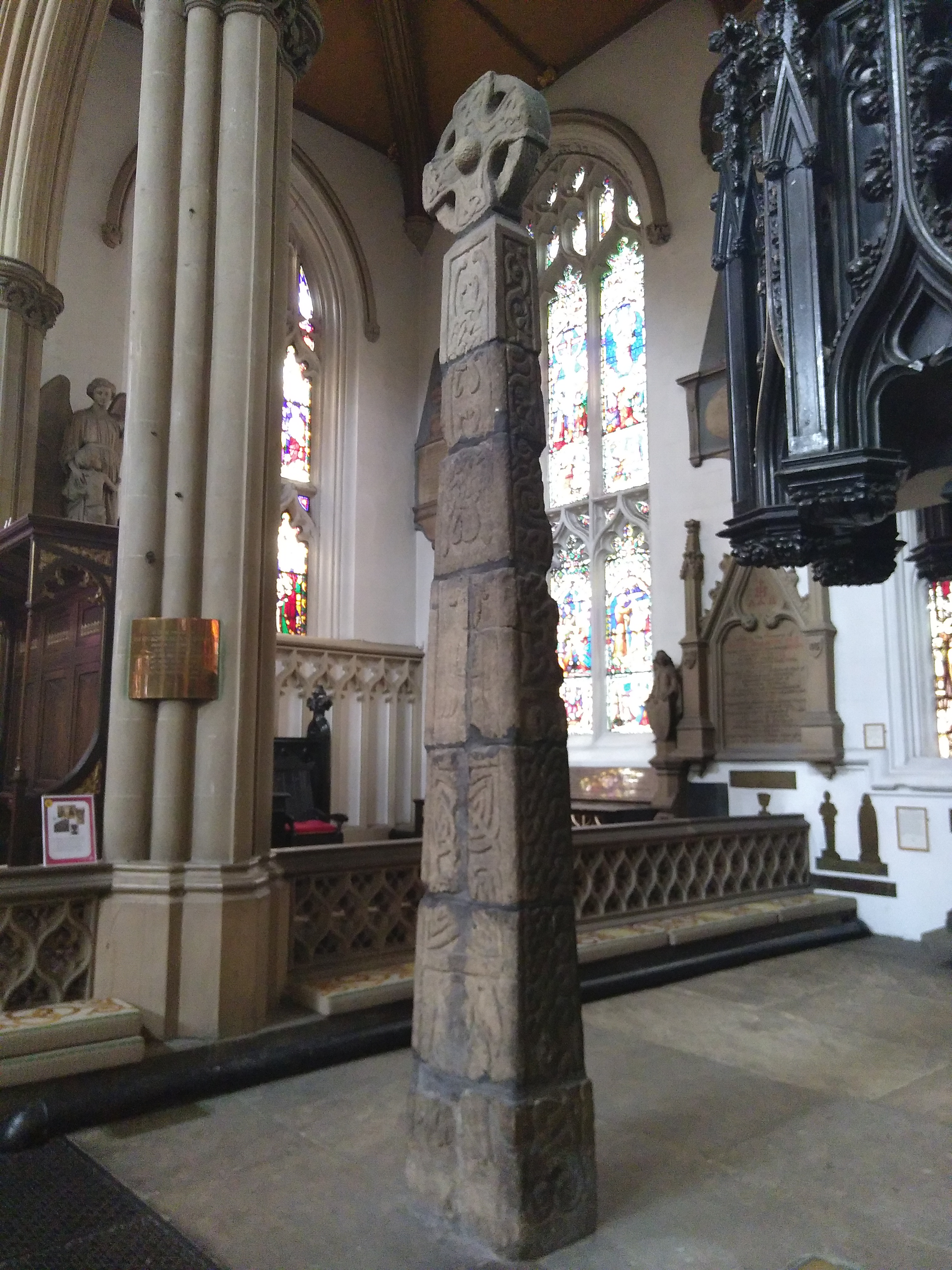
Leeds Cross

The Leeds Cross is an assembly of fragments of a tenth-century stone sculpture that has been reassembled into a cross, now on display in Leeds Minster.

The cross is located below Leeds Minister's pulpit. Made primarily out of sandstone, the cross has an older base and an artistic style consistent with Anglo-Scandinavian and Anglo Saxon sculpture.

The uppermost part of the sculpture is a brighter stone, a visual indicator of additions made in the reconstruction.The rectangular shape of the pillar allows for panel-based figural imagery on the front and floral embellishment carvings on the thinner sides.This figural imagery includes Weland and Beaduhild, two figures from Anglican folklore, as well as Christian imagery likely depicting celestial figures or a select few of the Four Evangelists.

Overall, the Leeds Cross important example of Anglo-Saxon and Anglo-Scandavian sculpture and stands out as a likely hybrid of the two styles, possibly indicating a cultural shift in the region.

== History ==
=== Origins ===
At the time of the cross's original creation, Leeds was a cultural center with a large population of Anglo-Scandinavians. The Leeds Cross is identified as an example of Anglo-Scandinavian sculpture due to its vine scrolls splitting into panels, a common differentiation indicative of a translation of the style from Anglo-Saxon to Anglo Scandinavian.

With the similarities in Anglo-Saxon and Anglo-Scandinavian culture, it is difficult to define the Leeds Cross precisely as one or the other. This hybridization of the art styles leads scholars such as Robert Halstead to believe that the item was originally meant to bring the cultures together via their shared similarities, hence the stylistic choices and the addition of shared mythological figures. This is indicative of an Anglo-Scandinavian cultural takeover of the priorly Anglo-Saxon region, with the Leeds Cross working as a symbolic conjoining of the cultures. Leeds Cross can be seen as an important transition between both the cultures and not as an imitative sculptures of Anglo-Saxon tradition. This being backed up with the few written records that remain as well as similar sculptures within the area made during the time period. Despite modern reconstruction and erosion not aiding in the identification of the iconography and the sculpture's original purposes, theories proposed by scholars such as Halstead and Lang conclude that the noble-like visages upon the panels suggest that the original construction was a memorial for a relative of the commissioner.

=== Discovery ===
The fragments of the cross were found in the fabric of Leeds Minster when the tower of the old church was demolished in 1838. In the reconstruction of the church, the architect, Robert Chantrell, noticed a collection of carved stones built into the medieval architecture, some of them forming the cross. The Leeds Cross was found due to a policy Chantrell enacted while demolishing the old church, which was to pay particular attention to finding and attempting to save stones with carvings on them. When the Leeds Cross was found, Chantrell rewarded the workers with a bonus from his own funds. His work on Leeds Minister as well as his reconstruction of the Leeds Cross led to him to work on other ecclesiastical projects within the area. According to Chantrell's will, as well as his colleague's notes, he liked the cross so much that he took it when he left Leeds and placed it in his cottage garden until it was returned posthumously.

== Reconstruction, reformation and issues ==
Besides its rediscovery and reformation, little is known about the history of the Leeds Cross. The history of the city of Leeds during this period is poorly documented, causing difficulty in clarification of the dominant culture of the area within the time of the creation of the Leeds Cross. What is assumed, due to archeological evidence, is that Anglo-Saxon and Anglo Scandinavian culture mixed during this time, which can be seen in the Leeds Cross. In addition, the matter of assembly raises questions about the validity and whether or not the final form of the Leeds Cross is the proper and original representation of the item, especially since modern reconstruction seemingly obscured several parts of the iconography.

A few fragments that were found were not assembled with the Leeds Cross, despite their likely association with the other fragments and instead, were placed elsewhere by Chantrell, eventually finding a home in Leeds City Museum. The non-assembled fragment depicts the lower half of Weland and Beaduhild. With the aforementioned difficulties surrounding precise records of prior reconstruction to Chantrell's, it is possible that the cross head and some of the visually brighter parts of the sculpture were stripped from other crosses of the same type within the region. The original object may not actually have been a cross. If this is the case, the cross would have been falsely created during the reconstruction.

== Iconography ==
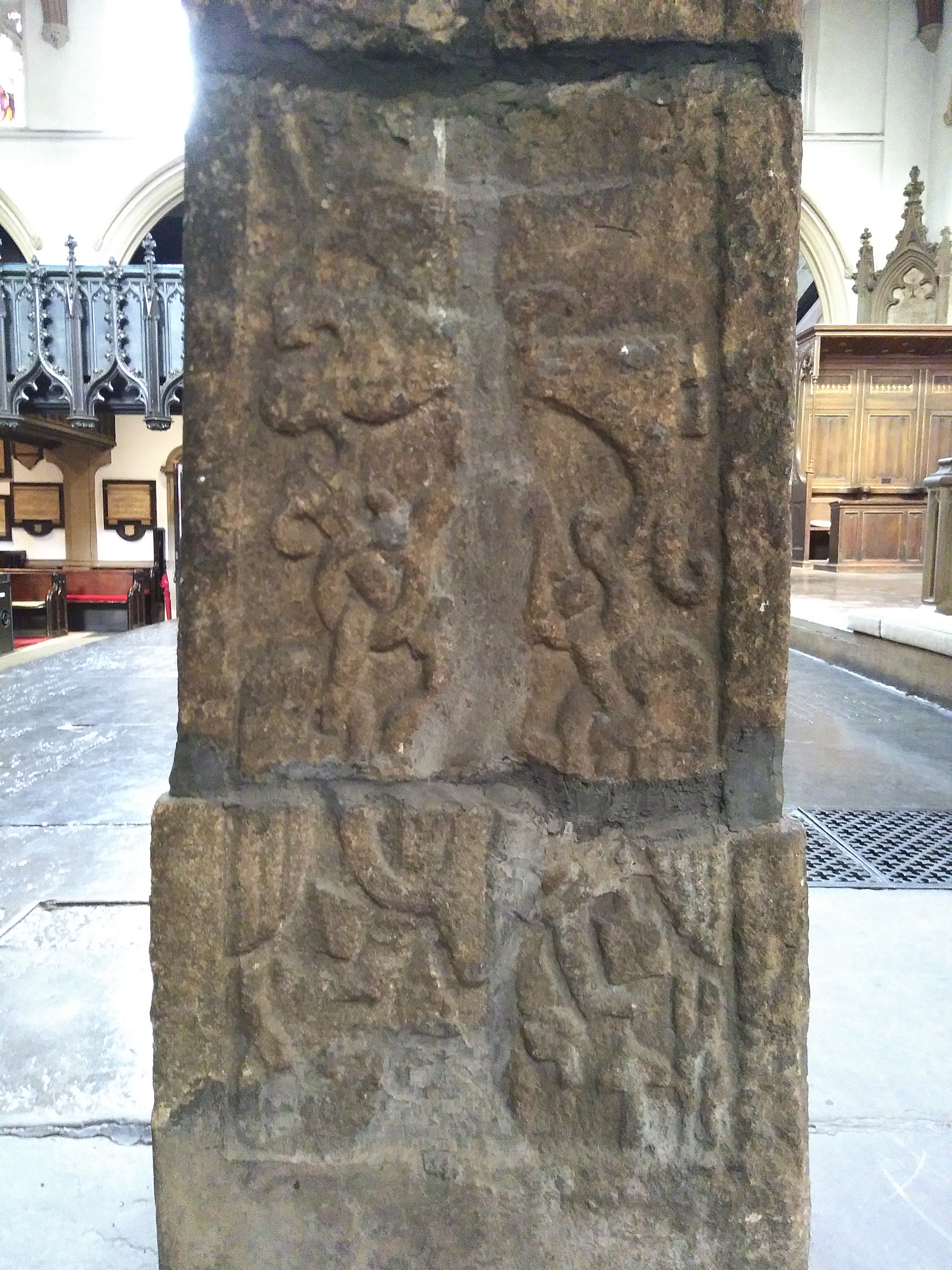
Panel Cii (3) depicting Weland holding Beaduhild/Bǫðvildr

The cross contains the most complete example of a number of depictions of the legendary smith Weland and Beaduhild, the mother of his child, from tenth-century Yorkshire. Weland, in both Scandinavian culture and Anglo-Saxon culture, is commonly used as a heraldic figure, often associated with victory. This symbolism is rooted in the mythical figure's quest to gather the stone that assured King Nithad’s victory, with depictions of him on carvings such as the Leeds Cross usually referring to a recent military victory. Weland's presence upon this carving likens him and Christ as fellow heroes in a culturally significant attempt to draw similarities between the two. The Leeds Cross contains interlaced vine decor throughout and consistently, but further analysis of the iconography beyond the figure of Weland, remains unclear. Scholars such as McGuire and Clark, as well as James T. Lang, believe there are multiple Christian figures including several Evangelists depicted in the carving, while others, such as Robert Halstead, believe there are fewer Christian figures. While the precise nature of each figure is less than definite, what is agreed upon is that the Cross contains at least one of the Evangelists. However, the exact number and identifications are highly debated by McGuire, Clark, and Halstead. St. John the Evangelist stands out as the most identifiable Evangelist while other figures such as Saint Luke and an angelic presence are debated upon. Celestial figures other than the Evangelists are slightly more certain, with the Holy Spirit in the form of a dove being the clearest familiar icon.

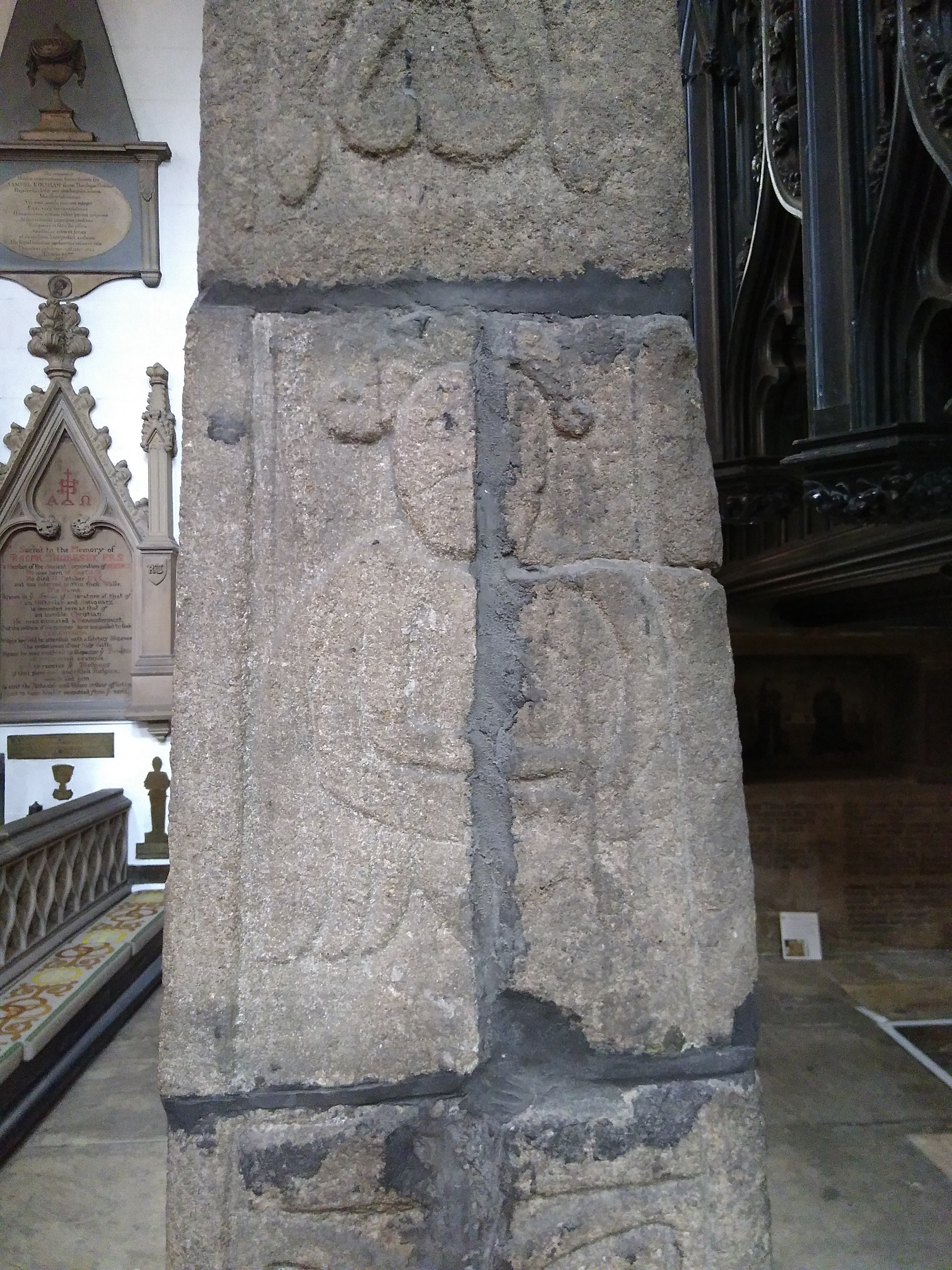
North facing panel Aii

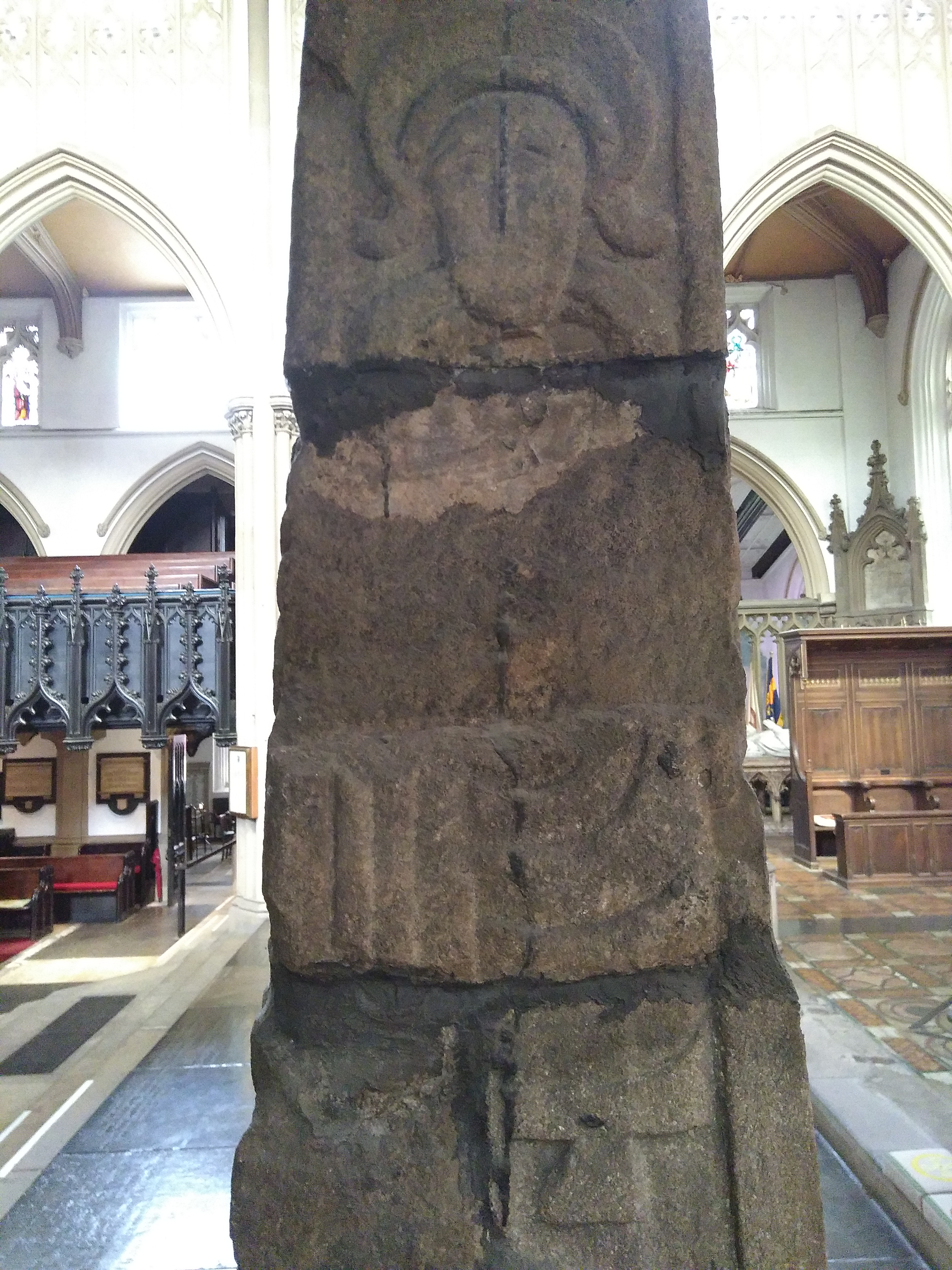
South facing Panel Ci Face A of Leeds cross fragment 2c, depicting the lower half of Weland/Vǫlundr,

The north-faced panel's iconography is debated due to its fragmented and eroded nature. It is difficult to properly discern what specifically being represented.The leading theories are that the figure is a cherub, an angel or that the figure is either is lacking Christian significance and could be simply a representation of the commissioner of the sculpture. Evidence for the iconography being a cherub, as proposed by James T. Lang, consists of the wings depicted on the figure. This would contrast with the depictions of Weland, due to the lack of Christian imagery typically associated with him. As for the possibility of it being an angel, scholars such as McGuire and Clark believe that the folds within the image combined with the wings are confirmation, due to angels typically being characterized with such imagery. In addition, despite its eroded features, Halstead theorizes that it might be possibly holding a scroll on the right hand side. If this theory is correct, it could be in reference to the Book of Revelation sculpted in a similar manner to other anglicic sculptures in Leeds. The theory of the lack of Christian significance coined by Halstead draws on the tendency for Anglo-Scandinavian sculpture to rarely depict angels in sculpture, with the lack of a halo aiding the skepticism of the figure's features being angelic in nature.

The top two panels on the south face side of the cross depict a heavy amount of Christian iconography. These house, according to Lang, an image of John the Evangelist. The bird depicted above the man, the possible book he holds in the partially destroyed side of the panel, as well as a disk-like halo behind his head seemingly confirming this. Evidence of similar evangelist iconography is present elsewhere in the region and book holding are a common in iconography associated with the Evangelists. Halstead debates the validity of this being an Evangelist and believes it to be the Virgin Mary in association with the Holy spirit, citing the similarities of associating it with the Virgin Mary and Weland's depiction on the Franks Casket.
