= Witege =

Character in several Germanic heroic legends

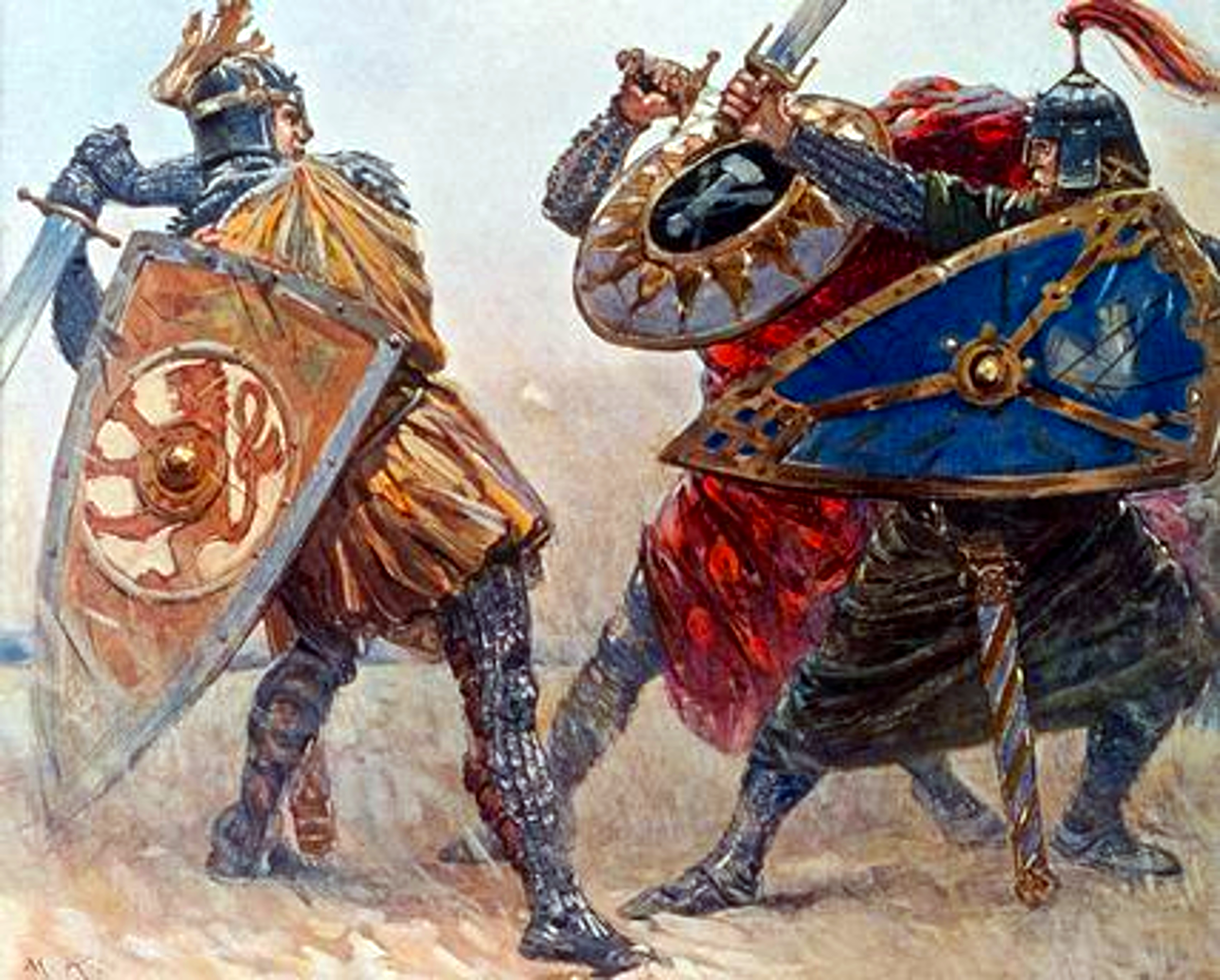
Wittich (in red) dishonourably battles two against one with Heime to defeat Alphart.

Witege, Witige or Wittich (Old English: Wudga, Widia; Gotho-Latin: Vidigoia) or Vidrik "Vidga" Verlandsson (Old Norse: Vidrīk + Viðga or Videke + Verlandsson, Vallandsson, or Villandsson) is a character in several Germanic heroic legends, poems about Dietrich von Bern, and later Scandinavian ballads.

In German legends, he was one of the warriors of Dietrich von Bern, but betrayed him and took instead the side of his wicked Uncle Ermenrich. In one of the Scandinavian ballads (TSB E 119), he won particular fame in his duel with Langben Rese/Risker (the giant Etgeir in the Þiðrekssaga).

During the Middle Ages, he became the son of Wayland the Smith and Böðvildr, and this entitled him to carry a hammer and tongs in his coat of arms. Later the origin of his name "Wayland's son" was forgotten, but the fame of the character prevailed. During the 16th and the 17th centuries, this led to the idea that his name "Villandsson" referred to Villand Hundred in Skåne, and the hundred duly began to use his coat of arms as its own. Wudga wielded the sword Mimung, forged by his father, as was the helmet he wore. His mount was the stallion Schimming, one of the finest horses of its age.

== Widsith ==
Medieval legends gave him this coat-of-arms, later appropriated by Villand Hundred in Scania.

One of the earliest appearances of Wudga is in the poem Widsith, lines 123-130, where he appears together with his friend Háma (Heimir):

Rædhere sohte ic ond Rondhere,
Rumstan ond Gislhere,
Wiþergield ond Freoþeric,
Wudgan ond Haman;
^{(125)} ne wæran þæt gesiþa
þa sæmestan,
þeah þe ic hy anihst
nemnan sceolde.
Ful oft of þam heape
hwinende fleag
giellende gar
on grome þeode;
wræccan þær weoldan
wundnan golde
^{(130)} werum ond wifum,
Wudga ond Hama.

Translation:

Raedhere sought I and Rondhere,
Rumstan and Gislhere,
Withergield and Freotheric,
Wudga and Hama;
^{(125)} not that these comrades were
the worst,
though I in the last place
name in this song.
Often from that group
hissing in flight
yelled the spear
at fierce people;
pressing their rule
to the gilded gold
^{(130)} of men and women,
were Wudga and Hama.

== Waldere ==
In the Anglo-Saxon fragment known as Waldere, Wudga (Widia) is mentioned together with his father Wayland in a praise of Mimung, Waldere's sword that Weyland had made.

:::... me ce bæteran
buton ðam anum, ðe ic eac hafa,
on stanfate stille gehided.
Ic wat þæt hit dohte Ðeodric Widian
selfum onsendon, ond eac sinc micel
maðma mid ði mece, monig oðres mid him
golde gegirwan, iulean genam,
þæs ðe hine of nearwum Niðhades mæg,
Welandes bearn, Widia ut forlet,
ðurh fifela geweald forð onette.

Translation:

... a better sword
except the one that I have also in
its stone-encrusted scabbard laid aside.
I know that Theodoric thought to Widia's self
to send it and much treasure too,
jewels with the blade, many more besides,
gold-geared; he received reward
when Nithhad's kinsman, Widia, Welund's son,
delivered him from durance;
through press of monsters hastened forth.'

Partly on the basis of this allusion, Jennifer Lorden has argued that, although he is not named in the poem, the five allusive vignettes that comprise the first half of the Old English poem Deor trace the birth and career of Widia.

== Middle High German Dietrich Poems ==
Witege is first mentioned in German literature in the early 1200s. He is alluded to briefly in the Nibelungenlied (c. 1200), where he is mentioned as the slayer of young Nuotung, the son of Rüdiger von Bechelaren. Wolfram von Eschenbach mentions Witege sarcastically as killing many thousands of men in battle in his poem Willehalm.

In the so-called fantastical Dietrich poems, Witege is one of Dietrich von Bern's warriors. In Laurin, Witige accompanies Dietrich and is responsible for destroying the dwarf King Laurin's rose garden. Dietrich then saves him from Laurin's wrath. Witige accompanies Dietrich, Hildebrand, and Dietleib into Laurin's kingdom and is captured. Dietleib arranges for their escape and the destruction of the dwarf kingdom. In Virginal, Witige, together with Heime, is one of the warriors who saves Dietrich from captivity in the hands of giants—a situation reminiscent of that in Waldere. He is also mentioned as one of Dietrich's warriors in the Rosengarten zu Worms, battling the giant Asprian.

In the so-called "historical" poems, which seem to take place after the fantastical ones, Witege has betrayed Dietrich and joined his wicked Uncle Ermenrich. No surviving poem relates the story of how Witege came to betray Dietrich, however; it is merely assumed as the situation from which the poems begin. One version of the Rosengarten, the reason is because Dietrich's man Wolfhart is angry that Witege had refused to fight unless he received Schemming—Witege requests to leave in order to avoid a feud and Dietrich allows him, reminding him of his oaths. In Dietrichs Flucht, Witege is responsible for capturing a large number of Dietrich's men. In order to have them returned, Dietrich must leave his kingdom. Witege is captured by Dietrich during the latter's attempt to reclaim his kingdom in Italy; Dietrich forgives Witege and trusts him with Ravenna. Witege soon betrays Dietrich, however, and hands the city over to Ermenrich, slaughtering the inhabitants. In the Rabenschlacht, Witege reluctantly kills the two sons of Etzel and Dietrich's brother Diether when he is forced to fight them. He is then pursued into the sea by a vengeful Dietrich, but saved by a mermaid. In Alpharts Tod, Witege and his companion Heime fight and kill the young warrior Alphart. Witege kills Alphart from behind in order to save Heime's life. He is nevertheless portrayed as reluctant to fight against his former friend Dietrich. He is mentioned as having slain the young Nuodunc in the Nibelungenlied.

Witege's horse Schemming and his sword Mimming are mentioned in multiple poems. One version of Virginal mentions that he bears a banner with a silver serpent and a hammer and tongs. In one version of the Rosengarten (A), Dietrich gives Schemming to Witege to encourage him to fight. In another, it is mentioned that Witege had lost Schemming to Dietrich, having originally received the horse from his father. In Dietrichs Flucht, however, Dietrich gives Witege Schemming when he has returned to his side. Schemming is the horse that saves Witege in the Rabenschlacht. Wielant the smith is mentioned as Witege's father in multiple poems.

== Þiðrekssaga ==
Before treating the adventures of Viðga (Wudga) and Heimir (Hama), the Þiðrekssaga introduces the Velents þáttr smiðs to explain how Wayland the Smith became the father of Viðga.

Viðga was only twelve years old when he decided to become a warrior. He was already strong and good at fighting with arms. His father gave Viðga weapons of his own manufacture, and most importantly his own sword Mimung and his horse Skemming.

Searching for the famous warrior Thiðrek (Dietrich von Bern), Viðga met Hildebrand, Háma and earl Hornbogi, but at first Hildibrand believed that Viðga was a dwarf. Viðga and Hildebrand became such good friends that they entered sworn brotherhood, but when they met Hildebrand secretly switched Viðga's sword with an ordinary one.

When Viðga finally met Þiðrek, the latter challenged Viðga to fight a duel with him, and Hildebrand failed with his attempts to make peace between the two. At first the two heroes jousted with lances during which Viðga's lance shattered on Þiðrek's shield. Viðga then cut off Þiðrek's lance and they continued on foot with their swords.

Finally Viðga's fake Mimung shattered on Þiðrek's sword and Þiðrek was about to give the unarmed Viðga his coup de grâce. Then Hildebrand returned the true Mimung to Viðga and Viðga got the upper hand in the duel. Eventually, Þiðrek had neither shield nor a functioning helmet, and Þiðrek's father Þetmar tried to stop the duel. Viðga was, however, furious with his opponent who had wanted to kill him and refused to stop the fight. It was only when a mighty stroke with the sword shattered Þiðrek's helmet and Hildebrand intervened that the fight ended. From that moment, Viðga became one of Þiðrek's companions.

There was a war between Sweden's (Vilkinaland) king Osantrix and Attila who had conquered Hunaland from Osantrix and taken his daughter. Eventually, Attila had to call on Þiðrek and his warriors who helped Attila defeat Osantrix. As the Swedes withdrew, Osantrix' duke Hertnid took Viðga prisoner and Osantrix put him in a dungeon. Viðga was then rescued by his friends Vildifer, who was disguised as a bear, and the minstrel Isung.

During his fight with Sigurd, Þiðrek borrowed Viðga's sword Mimung, and when Sigurd realised against whose sword he was fighting, he surrendered to Þiðrek.

== Historical background ==
Witege probably has a historic basis in either the Gothic national hero Vidigoia, or in Vitiges, a king of the Ostrogoths.

According to Jordanes, Vidigoia was Gothorum fortissimus and defeated the Sarmatians with a ruse for which he became the subject of epic songs among the Goths. Wudga's treachery may derive from Tufa who deserted Theodoric to join Odoacer, whereas Wudga's greatest treason, which was surrendering Ravenna, appears to be based on a merger with king Vitiges. This king surrendered Ravenna in 540 to a smaller Byzantine force led by Belisarius and the surrender was held to be a disgrace by his fellow Goths.

Further evidence that the Middle High German form "Witege" may be a worn down form of something like "Widigoia" is provided by the name "Witigouwe", a form which appears in Dietrichs Flucht together with Witige's companion Heime.
