= Njars =

Ancient Germanic people of Närke, Sweden

Njarar or Njars were an ancient Germanic people of Sweden, that appear in the Vǫlundarkviða. In the early part of the lay, King Níðuðr is introduced as a king in Sweden:

Níðuðr hét konungr í Svíþjóð.	Nidud was the name of a king in Sweden.

Later he is specified as the lord of the Njars:

Þat spyrr Níðuðr, Níára dróttinn, at einn Völundr sat í Ulfdölum; nóttum fóru seggir, neklðar váru brynjur, skildir bliku þeira við inn skarða mána. (Source)	When the Lord of the Njars, Nidud, heard That Völund sat in Wolfdale alone, He sent warriors forth: white their shield-bosses In the waning moon, and their mail glittered. (Translated by W. H. Auden and P. B. Taylor)

== See also ==
- List of Germanic tribes
