= Ardre image stones =

Runestone

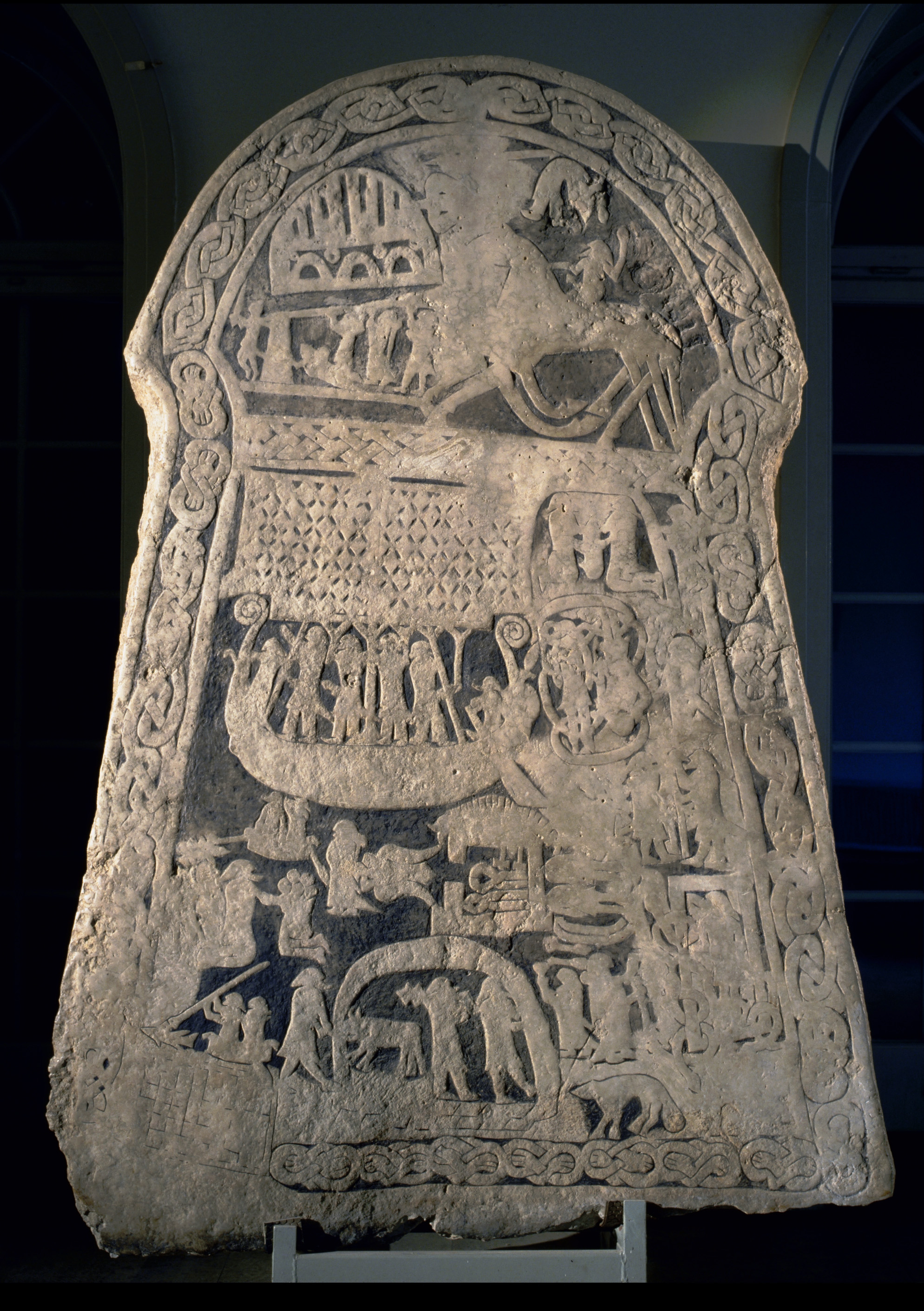
The largest of the Ardre image stones is Ardre VIII.

The Ardre image stones are a collection of ten rune and image stones, dated to the 8th to 11th centuries, that were discovered at Ardre Church, in Ardre, Gotland, Sweden. The principal edition is by Sune Lindqvist.

== Description ==
The Ardre image stones were re-used as paving under the wooden floors of the local church in the Ardre parish of Gotland. Before the historical significance of rune and image stones was understood or appreciated, they were often used as materials in the construction of roads, bridges, and buildings. The image stones were re-discovered when the church was being restored around 1900. The stones are now preserved in the Swedish Museum of National Antiquities in Stockholm.

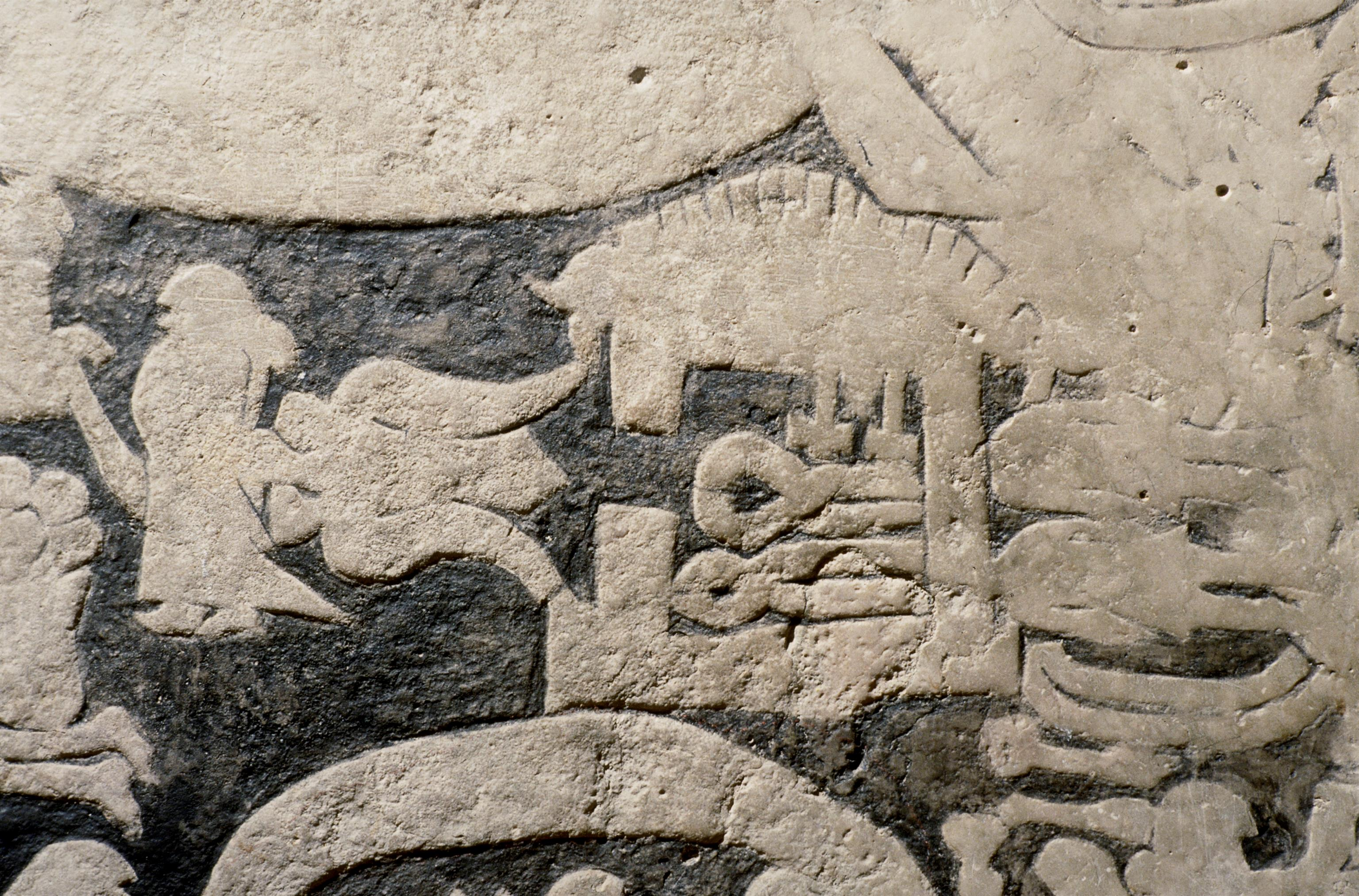
Ardre VIII detail showing the forge of Weyland.

=== Ardre VIII ===
The largest and most noted of the stones is the Ardre VIII stone, dated to the 8th or 9th century. It depicts scenes from Norse mythology, notably the Lay of Weyland the smith, Thor fishing for Jörmungandr, the punishment of Loki for the death of Baldr, and Odin riding to Valhalla on Sleipnir. Other images on this stone, such as the woman on the right with two swords, are not currently understood as they do not conform to any known Norse myth that has survived to the present time. The image-stone's longboat motif with its mariners somewhat resembles a depiction found on the Överhogdal tapestry No. III from Härjedalen. The main study of this stone is by Ludwig Buisson.

=== Ardre III ===
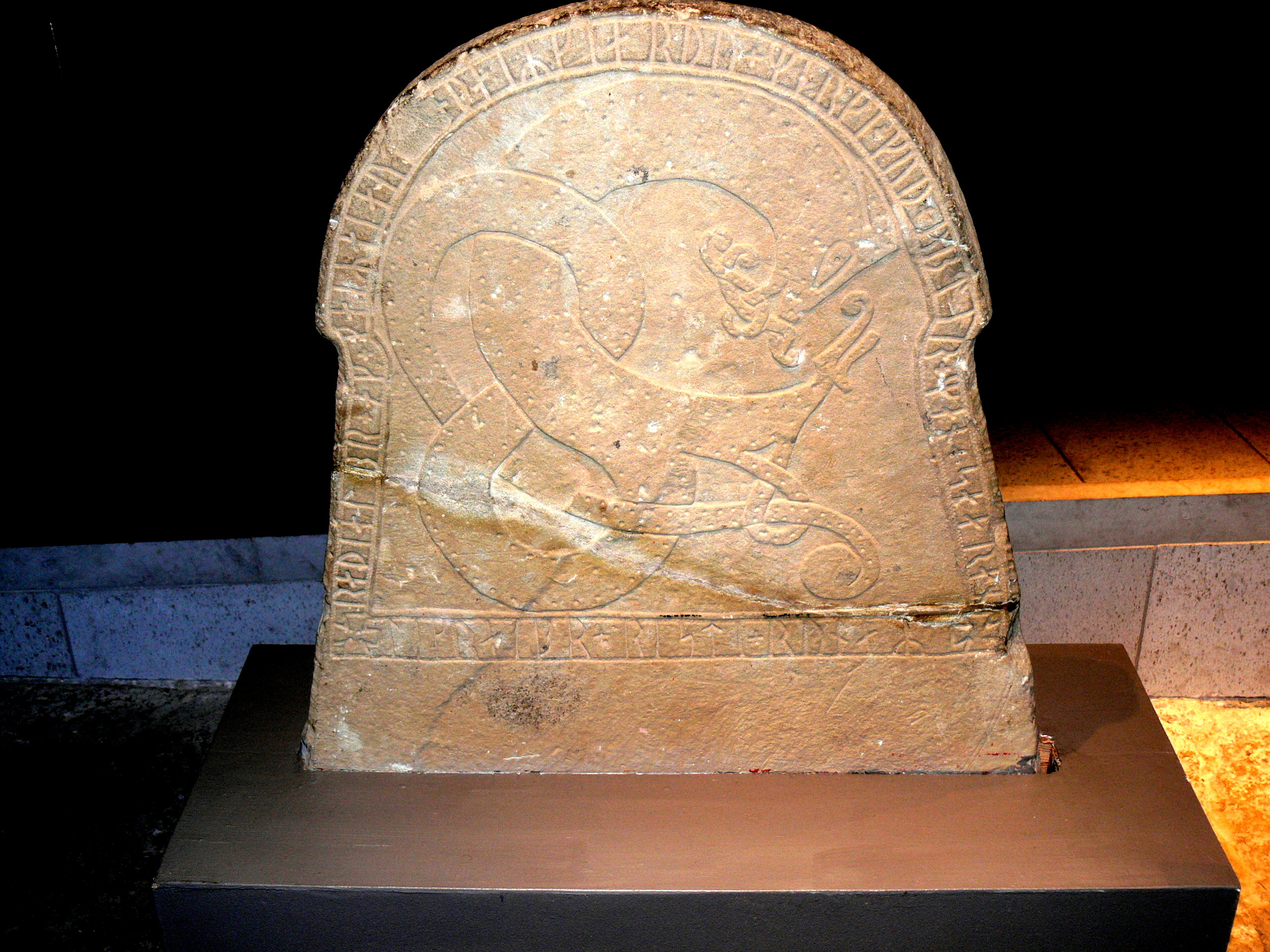
Side B of Ardre III.

The inscription on one of the two sides of the Ardre III runestone, which is listed in Rundata as Gotland Runic Inscription 113, consists of twin figure eight serpents with runic text in a band on the edge of the stone, while the second side has a single intertwined serpent with runic text on the edge of the stone. The inscription is classified as probably being in runestone style Pr3. The runic text, which is signed by a runemaster with the normalized name of Likraiv, indicates that it was raised as a memorial with different sponsors for the inscriptions on each side of the stone.

==== Inscription ====
===== Transliteration of the runes into Latin characters =====
§A ÷ utar + ak + kaiʀuatr + ak + aiuatr + þaʀ + setu + stain + ebtir + likna(t) + faþur ÷ sen +
§B ÷ raþialbr + ak + kaiʀaiau(t)- + þaiʀ kiarþu + merki + kuþ + ubtir + man + saaran ÷ likraibr + risti + runaʀ

===== Transcription into Old Norse =====
§A Ottarr ok Gæiʀhvatr ok Æihvatr þæiʀ sattu stæin æftiʀ Liknhvat, faður sinn.
§B Raðþialfʀ ok Gæiʀniut[r] þæiʀ gærðu mærki goð æftiʀ mann snaran. Liknræifʀ risti runaʀ.

===== Translation in English =====
§A Óttarr and Geirhvatr and Eihvatr, they placed the stone in memory of Líknhvatr, their father.
§B Ráðþjalfr and Geirnjótr, they made the good landmark in memory of ... man. Líknreifr carved the runes.
