= Hamstringing =

Method of crippling a person or animal by severing the hamstring tendons in the thigh

Hamstringing is a method of crippling a person or animal so that they cannot walk properly by severing the hamstring tendons in the thigh. It is used both as a swordfighting strike to incapacitate an enemy combatant, and as a method to torture the victim.

In animals, it is used as a method for disabling large prey to weaken them and prevent their escape. Once accomplished the attacker(s) can make a killing blow more safely and effectively.

== Use ==
Hamstringing is used primarily to incapacitate a human or animal and render them incapable of effective movement. The severing of the hamstring muscles results not only in the crippling of the leg, but also in pain.

== Method ==
In humans, the hamstring extends between the hip and knee joints. The hamstring muscle group is made up of the biceps femoris, semitendinosus muscle, and the semimembranosus. It facilitates both the flexing of the knee and hip extension, making it a vital contributor to normal leg-movement. By severing these muscles or the tendons involved in this process, normal leg-movement is disrupted. In addition to sustaining massive bleeding, the injured leg becomes useless and the victim is rendered lame. The severing of the hamstring is usually accomplished through use of a blade such as a knife or sword.

== Medical treatment ==
Due to a lack of research in the field of critical hamstring injuries, current injury-management practice is quite limited. Management of the injury is based solely "on clinical experience, anecdotal evidence and the knowledge of the biological basis of tissue repair". These injuries are difficult to control or repair, leading often to permanent injury or even death by blood loss.

== Historical usage ==
Sources from late antiquity indicate that hamstringing was commonly used to incapacitate combatants, prisoners and runaway slaves. The French Code Noir (1685) prescribed hamstringing as the punishment for slaves caught escaping for a second time.

== Use as metaphor ==
Literally, to "hamstring" an individual is to sever the tissues of their hamstring. As a metaphor, to be "hamstrung" suggests being limited, by external imposition or not, in a way that prevents full freedom of movement or utilization of resources.

== Biblical reference ==
Rendering chariot-horses lame by hamstringing is mentioned in the Book of Joshua in the Bible (the King James Version uses the term "houghing", from an old spelling of hock). In times of war, hamstringing an enemy's horses prevented the horses from being used in fighting.

== See also ==
•Kneecapping
