= Egil, brother of Volund =

Legendary archer of Germanic mythology

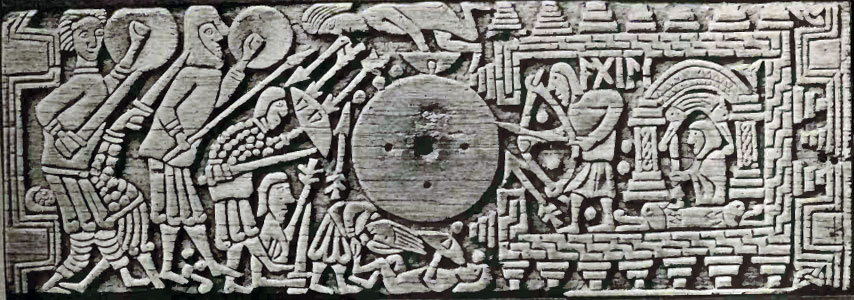
A panel of the Franks Casket showing Ægil and his wife enclosed in the keep at right, with Ægil shooting arrows against attacking troops. The name Ægili is written with runes above the archer.

Egil is a legendary hero of the Völundarkviða and the Thidreks saga. The name is from Proto-Germanic *Agilaz, and the same legend is reflected in Old English Ægil [ˈæɡil] of the Franks Casket and Alamannic Aigil of the Pforzen buckle.

The Proto-Germanic form of the legend may only be guessed at, but it appears likely that Egil was a renowned archer who defended a keep together with his wife Alruna, against numerous attackers. The testimony of the Pforzen buckle is uncertain beyond naming Aigil and Ailrun, possibly adding that they fought a battle at the Ilz river. The Franks Casket shows the scene of Aegil and his wife enclosed in the keep, with Aegil shooting arrows against attacking troops.

== Völundarkviða ==
In the Völundarkviða, Egil is a son of a Finn king, his elder brother being Slagfiðr, his younger one Völund. The three brothers marry valkyries they encounter in swans' form, Slagfiðr marries Hlaðguðr svanhvít, and Völund marries Hervör alvitr, daughters of king Hlödver, while Egil marries Ölrún, a daughter of the Roman Emperor (Kiár of Valland).

== Thidreks saga ==
In the Thidreks saga, Egil acts as a masterly archer, once he is forced by king Nidung to shoot an apple from the head of his son. He readies two arrows, but succeeds with the first one. Asked by the king what the second arrow was for, he said that had he killed his son with his first arrow, he would have shot the king with the second one. This tale is directly comparable to the legends of the Swiss hero William Tell and the Danish hero Palnatoke. As opposed to Tell's case, the king doesn't try to punish Egil for his openness, but, to the contrary, commends him for it (chapter 128). Völund is crippled by Nidung and held captive at his court. To help his brother, Egil shoots birds and collects their feathers, from which Völund makes a pair of wings. Völund ties a bladder filled with blood around his waist and flies away. Nidung commands Egil to shoot his fleeing brother, who hits the bladder, deceiving Nidung, and so Völund escapes (chapter 135).

== See also ==
- Wayland the Smith
- Achilles
