= Waldere =

Old English epic poem

"Waldere" or "Waldhere" is the conventional title given to two Old English fragments, of around 32 and 31 lines, from a lost epic poem, discovered in 1860 by E. C. Werlauff, Librarian, in the Danish Royal Library at Copenhagen, where it is still preserved. The parchment pages had been reused as stiffening in the binding of an Elizabethan prayer book, which had presumably come to Europe following the Dissolution of the Monasteries in England in the 16th century.

== Overview ==
The portion that was found was a part of a much larger work. What remains of the poem comes in two parts, written on two separate single leaves, usually called "fragment I" and "fragment II", and generally dated about 1000. The date of the poem's composition is unknown.

The fragments can be situated in the epic of which they formed part because the subject, adventures surrounding the hero Walter of Aquitaine, is known in other texts: a Latin epic poem Waltharius by Ekkehard of the Abbey of St. Gall, dating from the first half of the 10th century; fragments of a Bavarian poem dating from the first half of the 13th century; and two episodes in the Norwegian Þiðreks saga. Incidental references to Waldere occur in several Middle High German poems, and there is also a Polish version of the story, the earliest form of which is in Chronicon Boguphali Episcopi, dating from the 13th or 14th century.

The poem is the only proof that is known that the Anglo-Saxon people had any knowledge of the legend of Walter of Aquitaine. This was a very popular story in the Middle Ages. It is the story of Waldere (Walter) and Hildegyth who fall in love and steal treasure from the court of Attila, where they were held hostage. Waldere and Hildegyth are sought out by two men, Guthhere, who is the king of the Burgundians, and Hagena. These two men are after the treasure that Waldere and Hildegyth possess. The poem is about the conflict that is about to take place between the two parties.

In one fragment someone encourages Waldere to go on fighting. In the other there is praise of a sword, followed by Waldere's praise of his own armour and his defiance of Guthhere. The speeches represented in the fragments have nothing corresponding to them in Ekkehard's text, which suggests that these are independent renderings of the same familiar source material. A passing reference— "Win fame by valiant deeds, and may God guard thee the while"— shows that, like Beowulf, the poem had been given a Christianized context.

The first portion is a speech given by Hildegyth trying to motivate Waldere for his upcoming fight. In this speech, Paul Cavill finds, Hildegyth tries to inspire Waldere in four main ways: Mimming, the great sword of Waldere, that was made by the renowned smith Weland, is praised; Waldere is reminded that the only two outcomes available to a warrior are glory or death; all the good doings of Waldere are rehearsed, as well as the loftiness of his reputation; all doubt is cleared that it is truly Guthhere at fault for engaging Waldere.

The second fragment consists mainly of Waldere challenging and taunting Guthhere, daring Guthhere to strip Waldere's armor from his shoulders. The end of the fragment finds Waldere putting the outcome of the fight in God's hands (Cavill).

In the story of Walter, this fight results in harm to everyone that has participated. However, in the end the two sides come to a peaceful resolution and eventually Waldere and Hildegyth leave and both get married. This ending does not appear in the remaining fragments of Waldere.

== Editions and translations ==
Waldere was first edited by George Stephens (Copenhagen, 1860), afterwards by R. Wulker in Bibliothek der angel-sächsischen Poesie (vol. 1, Cassel, 1881); then by Peter Holthausen in Göteborgs högskolas årsskrift (vol. 5, 1899), with autotype reproductions of the two leaves which have been preserved. The first major translation of Waldere was by Frederick Norman in 1933 and the second by Arne Zettersten in 1979. Both are accompanied by commentary. A critical edition by Jonathan B. Himes appeared in 2009.

- Foys, Martin et al. (eds.) Old English Poetry in Facsimile Project, Madison, 2019-.
- Dobbie, Elliott Van Kirk, ed. (1942), The Anglo-Saxon Minor Poems, The Anglo-Saxon Poetic Records: A Collective Edition, New York: Columbia University Press, pp. 5–6, ISBN 9780231087704, OCLC 351982.

== Sources ==
- Robinson, William Clarke (1885), "2. Waldere, or Walter and Hildegunde", Introduction to our early English literature, London: Simpkin, Marshall & Co., pp. 16–18 [Text and translation]
- Bradley, S. A. J., tr.. Anglo-Saxon poetry: an anthology of Old English poems London: Dent, 1982. Translation.
- The Cambridge History of English and American Literature vol. I, iii.5 "The Waldhere Fragments".
- R. K. Gordon, Anglo-Saxon Poetry. (London: Dent) 1954:65. Partial text of the fragments in modern English..
- Cavill, Paul, University of Nottingham. "Waldere." The Literary Encyclopedia. 30 Oct. 2002. The Literary Dictionary Company.
- Strayer, Joseph R., ed. "Waldere." Dictionary of the Middle Ages. New York: Scribner, 1982.
- Wissolik, Richard David. "The Germanic Epic and Old English Heroic Poetry: Widsith, Waldere, and the Fight At Finnsburg." Old and Middle English Literature. Detroit: Gale Research, 1994. 90-91.
