= Háma (disambiguation) =

The name Háma (Old English: Hāma) may refer to:

- Háma, a hero in Anglo-Saxon and Norse mythology
- Háma (Middle-earth), two character in J. R. R. Tolkien's The Lord of the Rings; the first the son of Helm Hammerhand, the second the Doorward of king Theoden.

== See also ==
- Hama (disambiguation)
