= Widia =

Widia may refer to:

- Widia (hero), also known as Wudga, a hero in several early Germanic legends
- Widia (metal), hard material used for machining
- Widia Products Group, a subsidiary of Kennametal, umbrella brand of cutting tools
- Widia (king), a king of Ashkalon in the 14th century BCE, who wrote several of the Amarna letters.
