= Rosengarten zu Worms =

13th-century German literary work

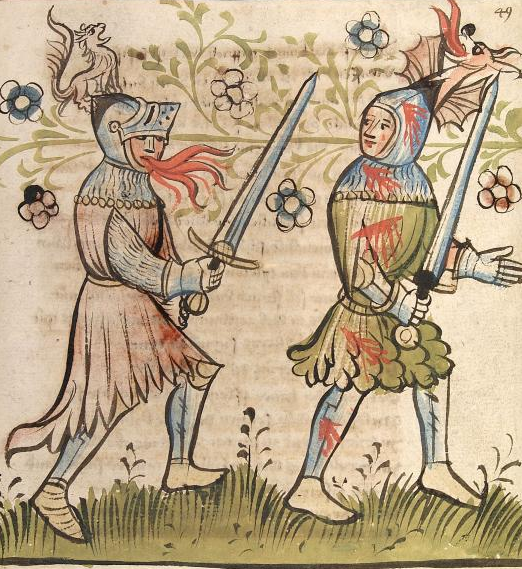
Dietrich and Siegfried from a 15th-century manuscript of the Rosengarten zu Worms

Der Rosengarten zu Worms (the rose garden at Worms), sometimes called Der große Rosengarten (the big rose garden) to differentiate it from Der kleine Rosengarten (Laurin), and often simply called the Rosengarten, is an anonymous thirteenth-century Middle High German heroic poem in the cycle of Dietrich von Bern. The Rosengarten may have been written as early as before 1250, but is securely attested by around 1300. It is unclear where it was written.

While it combines characters from the traditions of the Nibelungenlied, Walter of Aquitaine, and the Dietrich cycle, the Rosengarten is usually considered one of the so-called fantastical (aventiurehaft) poems about Dietrich: these poems more closely resemble a courtly romance than traditional heroic epic. Occasionally, because it features Dietrich fighting against human opponents rather than giants or dwarfs, it is grouped together with the similar poem Biterolf und Dietleib as a separate group of Dietrich poems.

Scholars count four or five versions of the Rosengarten. The poem talks about a fight between the heroes of the cycle around Dietrich von Bern with those from the Nibelungen saga, which takes place in a rose garden at the city of Worms. The fight is motivated by Kriemhild's desire to test the mettle of her fiancé Siegfried against Dietrich von Bern. In the end, Dietrich and his warriors defeat the Burgundians including Siegfried. The poem is conventionally seen as a condemnation of Kriemhild and by extension her role in the Nibelungenlied. It is often further understood as a metaliterary text discussing the nature of heroic poetry.

The Rosengarten was a very popular poem and was included in the printed Heldenbuch, bringing its transmission into the sixteenth century.

== Summary ==
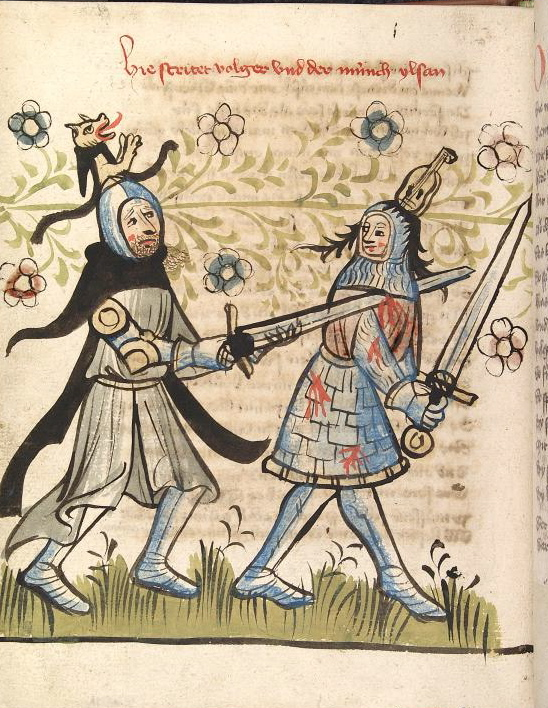
Volker fights Ilsan

Version A (older vulgate version): Kriemhilt, the daughter of Gibich, King of the Burgundians, has a magnificent rose garden in Worms, which is guarded by twelve heroes, including Gibich, her brothers, and Siegfried. She wishes to have Siegfried test his mettle against Dietrich von Bern, so a messenger is sent to Bern (Verona). The messenger announces there that Dietrich and twelve of his heroes should come to the rose garden to fight against its champions. The winner will receive a wreath of roses and a kiss from Kriemhilt. Dietrich is initially enraged by the audacity of this offer and wants to kill the messengers, however, he is calmed by Hildebrand and Wolfhart. He decides to take the invitation to battle. Hildebrand chooses which warriors will come, and includes his brother Ilsan, a monk, and Dietleib, who must be fetched. The hero Sigestab is sent to fetch Dietleib in Styria—he is at first unable to find Dietleib at his father Biterolf's, nor at Rüdiger's home in Bechelaren, but finds him in Vienna. Dietleib agrees to fight and they set off for Verona, where Dietrich has assembled an army. The army first heads to Ilsan's monastery, where Ilsan mistakes Dietrich for an enemy and attacks Hildebrand, who at first fights his brother then reveals his identity. Ilsan promises to bring wreaths of roses for his fellow monks after they angrily demand them and joins the heroes.

After their arrival in Worms, Hildebrand and Gibich select which warriors will fight against which. On the side of the Burgundians are many giants. Except for the battle between Dietleib and Walter of Aquitaine, which is a draw as they refuse to fight each other out of kinship, Dietrich's heroes win each battle. Witege, however, is unwilling to fight until Dietrich promises to give him the horse Schemming, which Dietrich exchanges for Witege's horse Valke. Dietrich is initially afraid to fight against Siegfried, noting that Siegfried's skin hardened in dragon's blood makes him impervious to defeat. He must be heckled into doing it by Hildebrand and Wolfhart, with Hildebrand finally striking Dietrich. They make him so angry he breathes fire, is able to break Siegfried's impenetrable skin, and easily defeats Siegfried, who flees to Kriemhilt's lap for safety. Finally, Ilsan challenges 52 opponents, defeats them all, and receives 52 wreaths of roses and 52 kisses from Kriemhilt, whose face bleeds from touching Ilsan's rough beard so much. Gibich agrees to become Dietrich's vassal, and the heroes head back to Bern. Ilsan gives his monks their wreaths of roses, pushes them down on their heads so that they bleed.

Version DP (vulgate version D): Gibich, lord of the rose garden at Worms, announces that whoever can defeat the guardians of his rose garden will receive him as a vassal. King Etzel hears of this and heads to Bern to see Dietrich. Dietrich says he will go to fight Gibich with Etzel, and he also receives a letter of challenge from Kriemhilt. Hildebrand selects the champions, and Dietrich's brother Diether goes to fetch Dietleib and Rüdiger. Dietrich and Hildebrand fetch Ilsan, then everyone heads to Etzel's palace, where they are received by his wife Herche. The heroes then march to the Rhine, where the ferryman Norprecht demands a hand and a foot as payment to ferry them across. Ilsan defeats the ferryman and the army is ferried across the Rhine. Dietrich and Etzel's men set up a camp outside Worms. Hildebrand arranges who will fight whom; once again there are many giants on the Burgundians' side. Wolfhart fights against Hagen. Witege again refuses to fight until Dietrich gives him Schemming—this horse had been given to him by his father and he had lost it to Dietrich. Gibich's men are defeated and he becomes a vassal of Dietrich and Etzel. Every victor receives a garland and a kiss from a maiden, and Hagen and Wolfhart are reconciled. Hagen curses Kriemhild, and the heroes head home.

== Transmission, versions, and composition ==
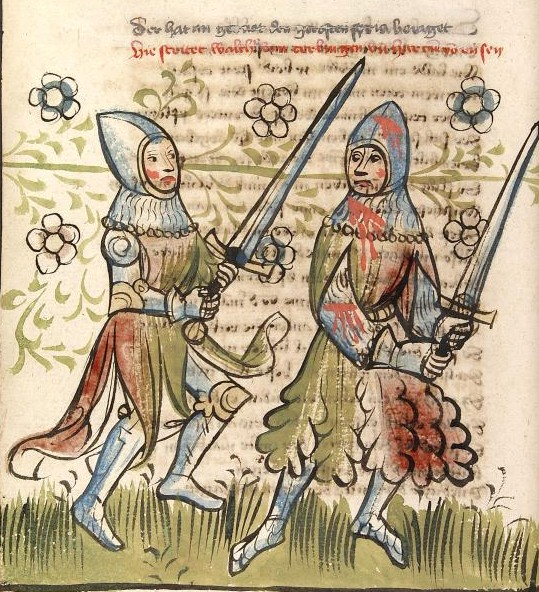
Walter of Aquitaine and Hertnit (Hartunc) von Riuzen.

The Rosengarten is conventionally dated to the first half of the thirteenth century, partially due to its close relationship to the poem Biterolf und Dietleib. The first manuscript of the text only come from the beginning of the fourteenth century, however, and the earliest mention of the work is in Ottokar's aus der Gaal's Steirische Reimchronik, comparing King Ottokar II of Bohemia's prowess in battle to that shown by Dietrich fighting Siegfried in the rose garden. It is unclear where the poem may have been written. As with almost all German heroic epic, it is anonymous.

Five overarching versions of the Rosengarten are usually recognized: A, DP, F, C, and a Middle Low German version. Version F is fragmentary, while C represents a mixture of A and DP. Version A can be further subdivided into an older vulgate version, a younger vulgate version, and the Dresdner version. Version DP can be further subdivided into versions D and P, with P being a shorter version of D. Version A has around 390 stanzas, version D around 633. Given the great variability between manuscripts, each individual attested text can also be considered a version.

Manuscripts of Version A (older vulgate version) are:

- R_{4} (Aa, d^{n}, a): fourteenth century, lost. Preserved in a transcription.
- R_{10}: Stadtbibliothek Dessau, Hs. Georg. 224 4°. Paper, 1422, from Trier. Contains various poems in rhyming couplets, including the Rosengarten and Laurin.
- R_{11} (Aa, m), formerly Bayerische Staatsbibliothek Munich, Cgm. 429. Lost. Paper, middle of fifteenth century, from Augsburg(?). Contains a romance by der Stricker and the Rosengarten.
- R_{12} (Ac, b): Staatsbibliothek Berlin, Ms. germ. 4° 744. Paper, 1453, Central German dialect.
- R_{17} (Aa, d): Sächsische Landesbibliothek Dresden, Msc. M 56. Paper, 1489, from Augsburg(?). Romance by der Stricker and Rosengarten.
- R_{20}: Biblioteka Jagiellońska Krakow, Berol. Ms. germ. 4° 1497. Paper, fifteenth century, Upper German or Middle German dialect. Contains various spiritual texts, also Laurin and the Rosengarten.

Version A (younger vulgate version): exists in six printings of the Heldenbuch.

Version A (Dresdner version):

- R_{14} (B, ß): Dresdner Heldenbuch. Sächsische Landesbibliothek Dresden, Msc. M 201. Paper, 1472, from Nuremberg(?).

Version DP (vulgate version D):

- R_{8} (K): Kongelige Bibliotek Copenhagen, Fragmenter 18 I. Parchment, fifteenth century, Bavarian dialect. Fragmentary, contains various texts, including the Rosengarten and Virginal.
- R_{9} (Da, h): Universitätsbibliothek Heidelberg, Cpg. 359. Paper, around 1420, from Alsace(?). Contains various texts.
- R_{15} (Dc, s_{1}: second Strasbourg Heldenbuch. formerly City Library/Hospitalar Library Strasbourg, Cod. B 81. Destroyed in 1870.
- R_{16} (Db, s): Heldenbuch von Diebolt von Hanowe. Formerly Strasbourg City/Seminary Library, destroyed 1870.
- R_{18} (Dd, b_{1}: Staatsbibliothek Berlin, Ms. germ 4° 577. Fragment of a paper manuscript, turn of the sixteenth century, Central German dialect.

DP (version P):

- R_{5} (T): Narodní muzeum, Prague, Cod. I E a 3. Fragment of a parchment manuscript, first half of the fourteenth century. From Bohemia(?).
- R_{6} (Dc, p): Graf von Schönbornsche Schlossbibliothek Pommersfelden, Cod. 54. Paper, middle of fourteenth century, from Erfurt(?). Contains various poems in rhyming couplets, including the Rosengarten zu Worms and Laurin.

Version F:

- R_{1} (F_{2}: Národní knihovna České republiky Prague, Fragm. germ. 5. Fragment of a parchment manuscript, first half of the fourteenth century, Central German dialect.
- R_{2} (F, B, F_{3}: Staatsbibliothek Berlin, Nachlass Grimm Nr. 131,4. Fragment of a parchment manuscript, beginning of fourteenth century, Central German dialect.
- R_{3} (D, F_{1}: formerly Danzig, Stadtbibliothek Ms. 2412. Lost. Fragment of a parchment manuscript, fourteenth century, Central German dialect.

Version C:

- R_{7} (C, f): Stadt- und Universitätsbibliothek Frankfurt am Main, Ms. germ. 4° 2. Stadt- und Universitätsbibliothek Frankfurt am Main, Ms. germ. 4° 2. Paper, second half of the fourteenth century, Rhine Franconian dialect. Contains various texts in rhyming couplets, including the Rosengarten and Laurin.

Low German version:

- R_{13}: Graf von Schönbornsche Schlossbibliothek Pommersfelden, Cod. 5. Paper, 1470, Low German dialect. Contains Berthold von Holle's Crane and the beginning of the Rosengarten.

Fragments unassigned to any version:

- R_{19}: Fragment, found in Staatsbibliothek Berlin, Ms. theol. lat. 2° 82. Parchment, first third of the fourteenth century, Central German dialect.
- R_{21}: Pfarrarchiv Kempen, H 44. Fragment of a parchment manuscript, first half of the fourteenth century, Low German.

== Interpretation ==
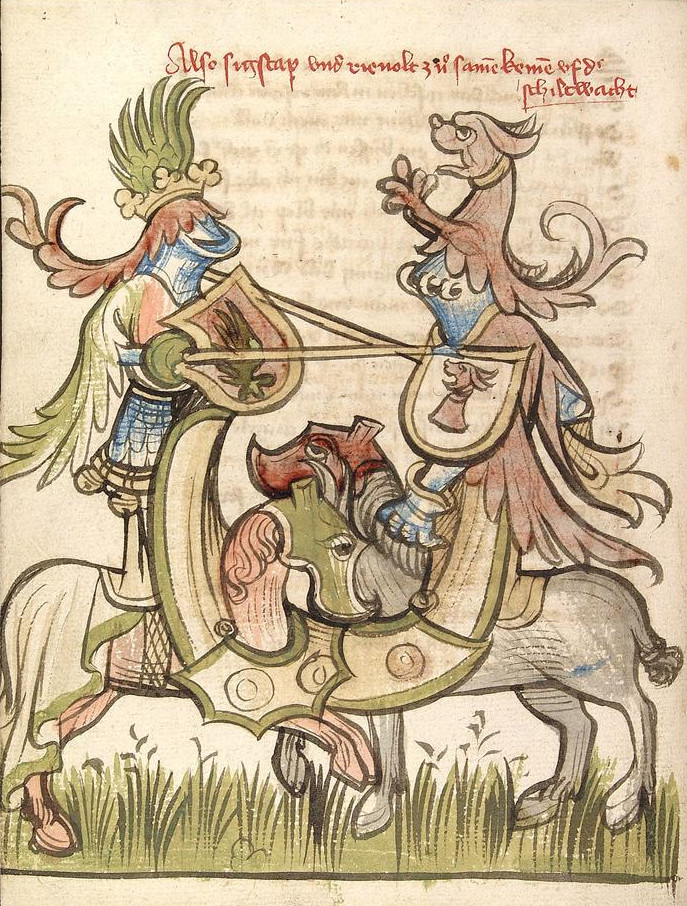
Sigestap fighting Rienolt as a joust

The Rosengarten has long been read as a metaliterary text about German heroic poetry, with Michael Curschmann calling it "poetry about heroic poetry" ("Dichtung über Heldendichtung"). The poem contains numerous citations and allusions to various heroic traditions via objects such as swords and horses, as well as the names of various heroes. Victor Millet takes the poem's mixing of various elements from other texts that could not occur at the same time as a sign of its citation of other heroic poems in order to comment on them. Version D, moreover, cites or reverses many motifs of the historical Dietrich epics Dietrichs Flucht and the Rabenschlacht: Etzel seeks Dietrich, a reversal of Dietrich's exile at Etzel's court, and Dietrich increases Etzel's power by forcing Gibich to become his vassal. Witege, moreover, receives his horse Schemming and also asks to leave Dietrich's service due to Wolfhart's anger over this gift, foreshadowing his treachery and escape on Schemming in the Rabenschlacht. The text also contains an explicit allusion to Witege's role in Alpharts Tod.

Especially important for understanding the text is its portrayal of Kriemhilt. She plays the role of a ruling courtly lady as found in courtly romance, and in this role she is criticized as hubristic and proud. The use of the rose garden as the place of combat, whatever its original significance, also seems a clear citation of courtly adventure. In version A, she seems justly punished by Ilsan's many rough kisses that cause her to bleed. The poem also clarifies a problem left unanswered in the Nibelungenlied: by portraying Kriemhilt and Siegfried in a negative light, the text marks Kriemhilt as a villain in the Nibelungenlied as well. Version DP, on the hand, satirizes many elements of the Nibelungenlied. In this version, Kriemhilt is most heavily criticized by the Burgundians rather than Dietrich's men.

Millet suggests that the rivalry between heroes from western part (the Burgundians) and the southeastern part (Dietrich's men) of the German-speaking area may reflect real political struggles between these two areas, as well as a cultural rivalry between Rhinelandish courtliness and a less idealistic Austrian and Bavarian ideal of heroism. The figure of Ilsan and the other monks may be intended to criticize the state of monastic life at the time of the poem's composition. All versions of the poem contain numerous comical elements.

== Metrical form ==
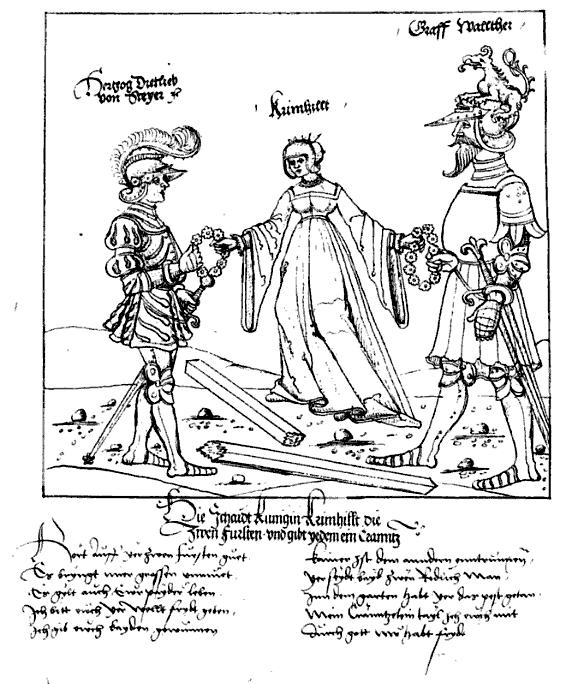
Dietleib and Walther both receive a garland of roses from Kriemhild. Image from a text of the Berlin Rosengarten play, SB Berlin mgf 800, Bl. 2v.

The Rosengarten is composed, like most German heroic poems, in stanzas. The stanza used in the Rosengarten is the so-called "Hildebrandston", a variant of the stanza used in the Nibelungenlied in which all the lines are of the same length. Each line consists of three metrical feet, a caesura, and three additional feet. The following example from Alpharts Tod can illustrate:

Also der lyechte morgen || an den hymel kam,
da stont vff myt sorgen || der forst lobesam,
der degen küne, || als jne dye sorge betzwang.
wan jm dye helde kemen, || dye wile was jm lang.

Several versions use a variant of this stanza called the "Heunenweise" or "Hunnenweise" (the Hunnish melody), in which there are always rhymes at the mid-line caesura. This variant can also be understood to be made up of eight short verses, taking the caesuras as line endings.

== Relation to the oral tradition ==
A connection between this poem and Dietrichs encounter with Siegfried in the Thidrekssaga is sometimes speculated upon. In the Thidrekssaga, Thidrek fights against Sigurd during his campaign in "Bertangenland", an event possibly also referenced in the Virginal. Thidrek goes to that country with twelve warriors, and is challenged by twelve native warriors in turn. Thidrek fights Sigurd, breaking his horned-skin by borrowing Wiðga (Witege)'s sword Mimming. Following the defeat, Sigurd becomes one of Thidrek's men. If any connection exists between this episode and the Rosengarten then either the author of the Thidrekssaga knew of the Rosengarten and altered it for his work (meaning that the Rosengarten existed in the early 13th century) or there was an even older tale of Dietrich's encounter with Siegfried which diverged into the story found in the Thidrekssaga and that of the Rosengarten. Another version of Siegfried's defeat by Dietrich is recounted in the Rabenschlacht—Michael Curschmann has suggested a common oral source for both. The Heldenbuch-Prosa reports that Dietrich killed Siegfried in the rose garden, suggesting that this was another variant of the story in circulation.

In turns of the oral tradition, it is notable that Kriemhilt and Gunther's father has the name Gibich, corresponding to the Norse tradition, Das Lied vom Hürnen Seyfrid, and the Waltharius, which in the Nibelungenlied has been replaced by another name. This suggests that the poet knew an oral tradition independent of the written Nibelungenlied, although the author clearly alludes to various aspects of that poem and even cites various lines.

The location of the battle in a rose garden may have been influenced by the similar use of a rose garden in Laurin. The use of the rose garden is also suggestive of courtly romance. Heinzle also notes that there are various reports of tournaments in medieval Worms taking place in rose gardens, which either inspired the location in the poem or else were imitating it. A newer suggestion is that the rose garden is a corruption of the name Rusigard, meaning "Russian City", and could be connected to the numerous allusions to Dietrich's battles against Russians or Slavs (see Dietrich und Wenezlan) found in German heroic tradition, and which are narrated in the Thidrekssaga.

== Reception ==
The Rosengarten likely inspired the similar Biterolf und Dietleib, another heroic poem that may date from the thirteenth century. A scene in the Rabenschlacht in which Siegfried and Dietrich fight may also have been inspired by the poem. The Rosengarten was included in the popular early modern printed Heldenbuch, thereby assuring its transmission until 1600.

The Rosengarten was translated into Czech in the fourteenth century. Only fragments survive of this translation. The story was also reworked into a play in the fifteenth century, although the earliest extant copies date from the sixteenth century. The Rosengarten, likely as known from the Heldenbuch, was also reworked into an episode of Hans Sachs's tragedy about the life of Siegfried, Der hürnen Seufrid in 1557.

== Editions ==
- Lienert, Elisabeth; Kerth, Sonja; Nierentz, Svenja, eds. (2015). Rosengarten. Texte und Studien zur mittelhochdeutschen Heldenepik. Berlin: de Gruyter. ISBN 978-3-11-036786-7.
- Holz, Georg, ed. (1893). Die Gedichte vom Rosengarten zu Worms. Halle: Niemeyer.

=== Translations ===
==== English ====
- Weber, Henry William; Jamieson, Robert; Scott, Walter (1814). "Of the Garden of Roses at Worms". Illustrations of Northern Antiquities from the earlier Teutonic and Scandinavian Romances; being an abstract of the Book of Heroes and Nibelungen Lay; with translations from the old German, Danish, Swedish, and Icelandic languages; with notes and dissertations. Edinburgh: Longman, Hurst, Rees, Orme, and Brown. pp. 137–149.

==== Modern German ====
- Simrock, Karl (1859). "Der Rosengarten". Das kleine Heldenbuch. Stuttgart, Augsburg: Cotta. pp. 245–355.
