= Ambraser Heldenbuch =

16th-century Early New High German manuscript

- Austrian National Library, Cod. ser. nova 2663
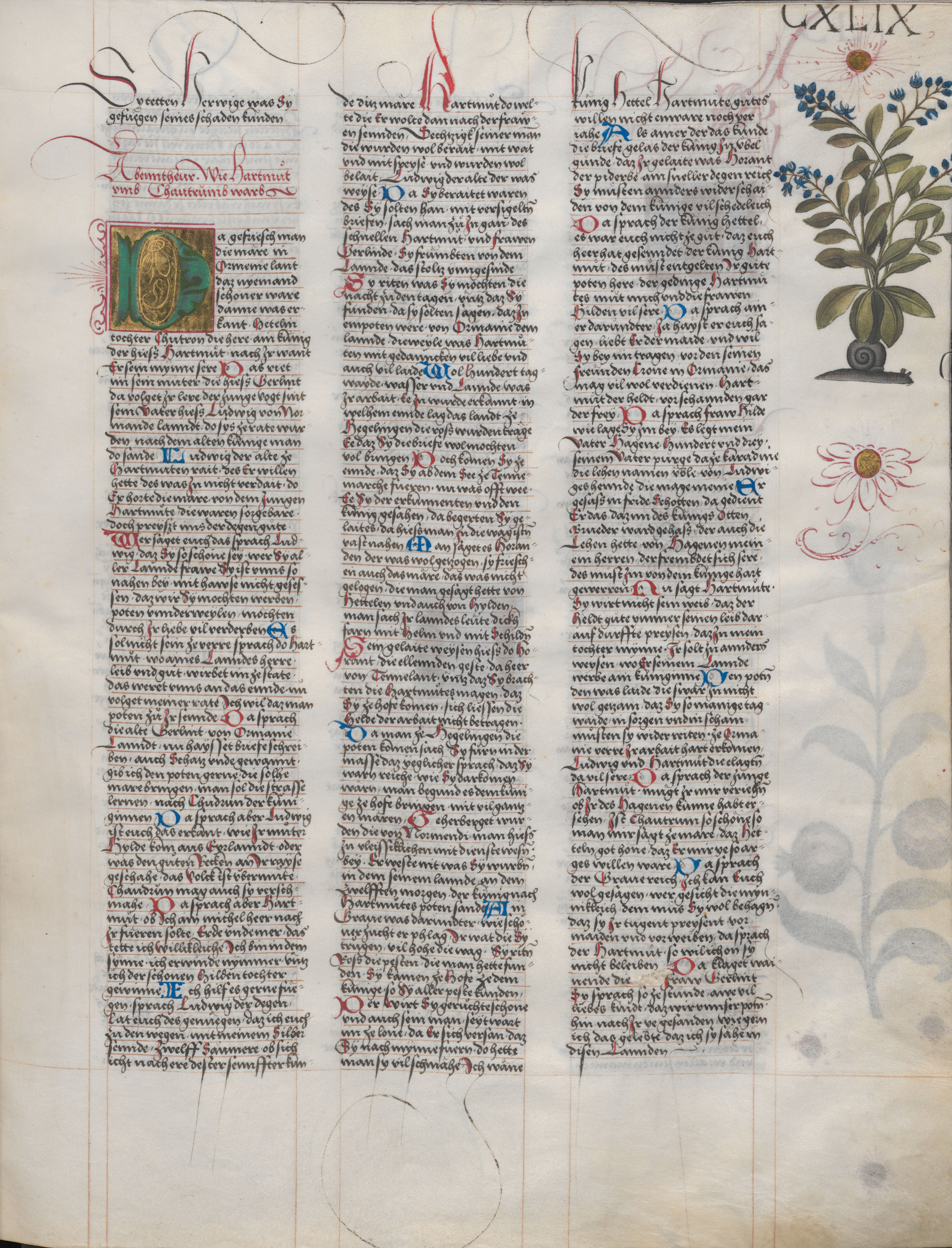
- Ambraser Heldenbuch, fol. 149^{r}
- Date: 1517
- Language: Early New High German (South Bavarian)
- Scribe: Hans Ried
- Author: Various
- Illuminated by: Ulrich Funk or Veit Fiedler
- Patron: Maximilian I, Holy Roman Emperor
- Material: Parchment
- Size: V + 238 folios
- Format: 460 x 360 mm, 3 columns
- Script: Chancery script
- Contents: 25 works of narrative verse
- Illumination: Marginal decoration
- Previously kept: Ambras Castle; Kunsthistorisches Museum, Vienna

The Ambraser Heldenbuch ("The Ambras Castle Book of Heroes") is a 16th-century manuscript written in Early New High German, now held in the Austrian National Library (signature Cod. ser. nova 2663). It contains a collection of 25 Middle High German courtly and heroic narratives along with some shorter works, all dating from the 12th and 13th centuries. For many of the texts it is the sole surviving source, which makes the manuscript highly significant for the history of German literature. The manuscript also attests to an enduring taste for the poetry of the MHG classical period among the upper classes.

== History ==
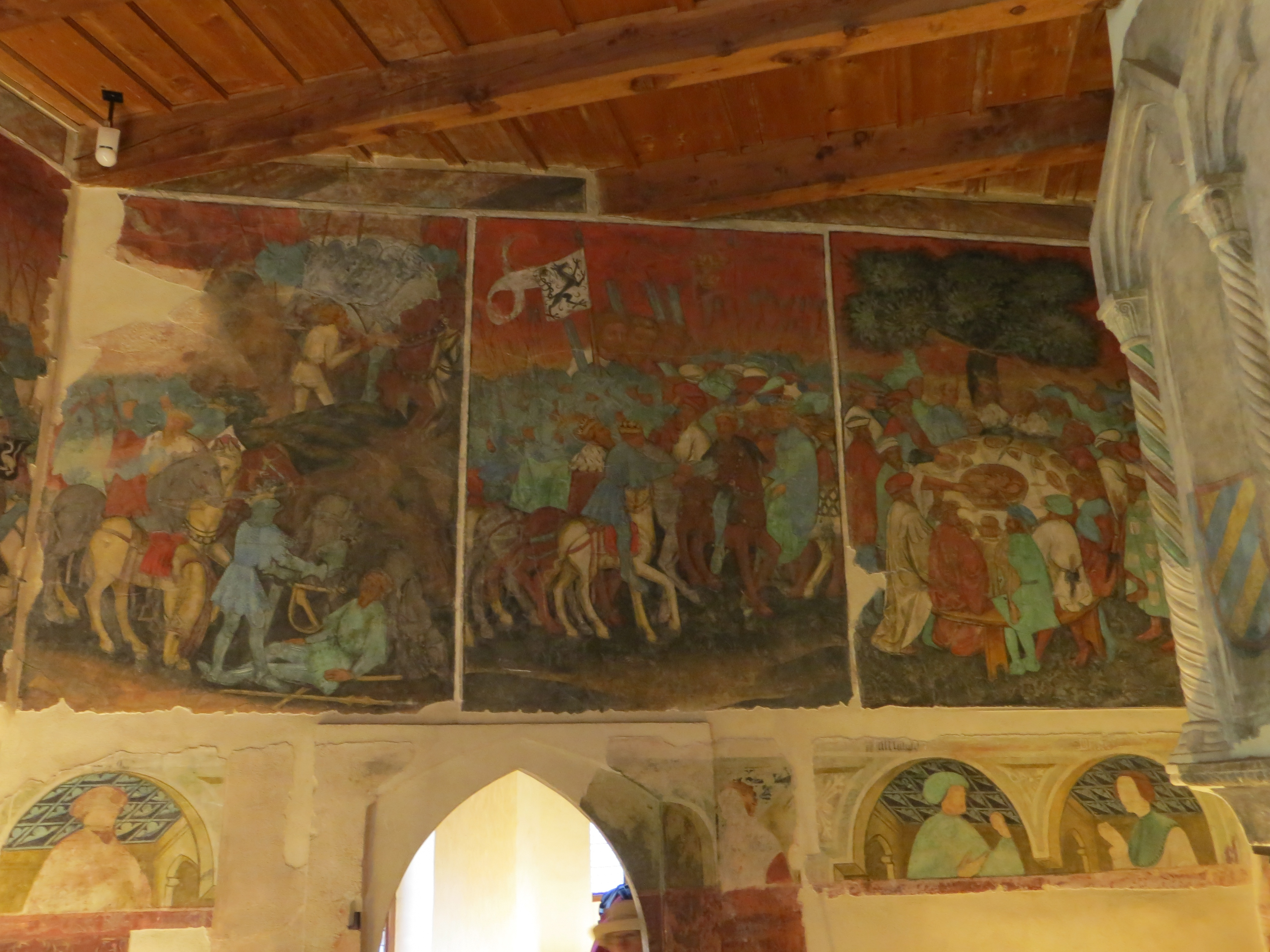
Frescoes in the Runkelstein Castle

The manuscript was commissioned by the Emperor Maximilian I and written by Hans Ried in Bolzano, who worked as a civil servant (tax collector and member of the chancery) in Maximilian's government, over a period of years from 1504 to 1516. Apparently Ried deliberately prolonged the writing process, in order to continue receiving payment without having to return to his tax collecting job.

The Ambraser Heldenbuch was originally kept in the Chamber of Art and Curiosities at Ambras Castle, near Innsbruck, but in 1806, because of the uncertainty of the Napoleonic Wars, the Austrian Emperor Francis I had it moved to the Kunsthistorisches Museum in Vienna. After the First World War it was transferred to the Vienna Hof-Bibliothek ("Court Library"), which in 1920 became the Österreichische Nationalbibliothek ("Austrian National Library").

== Description ==
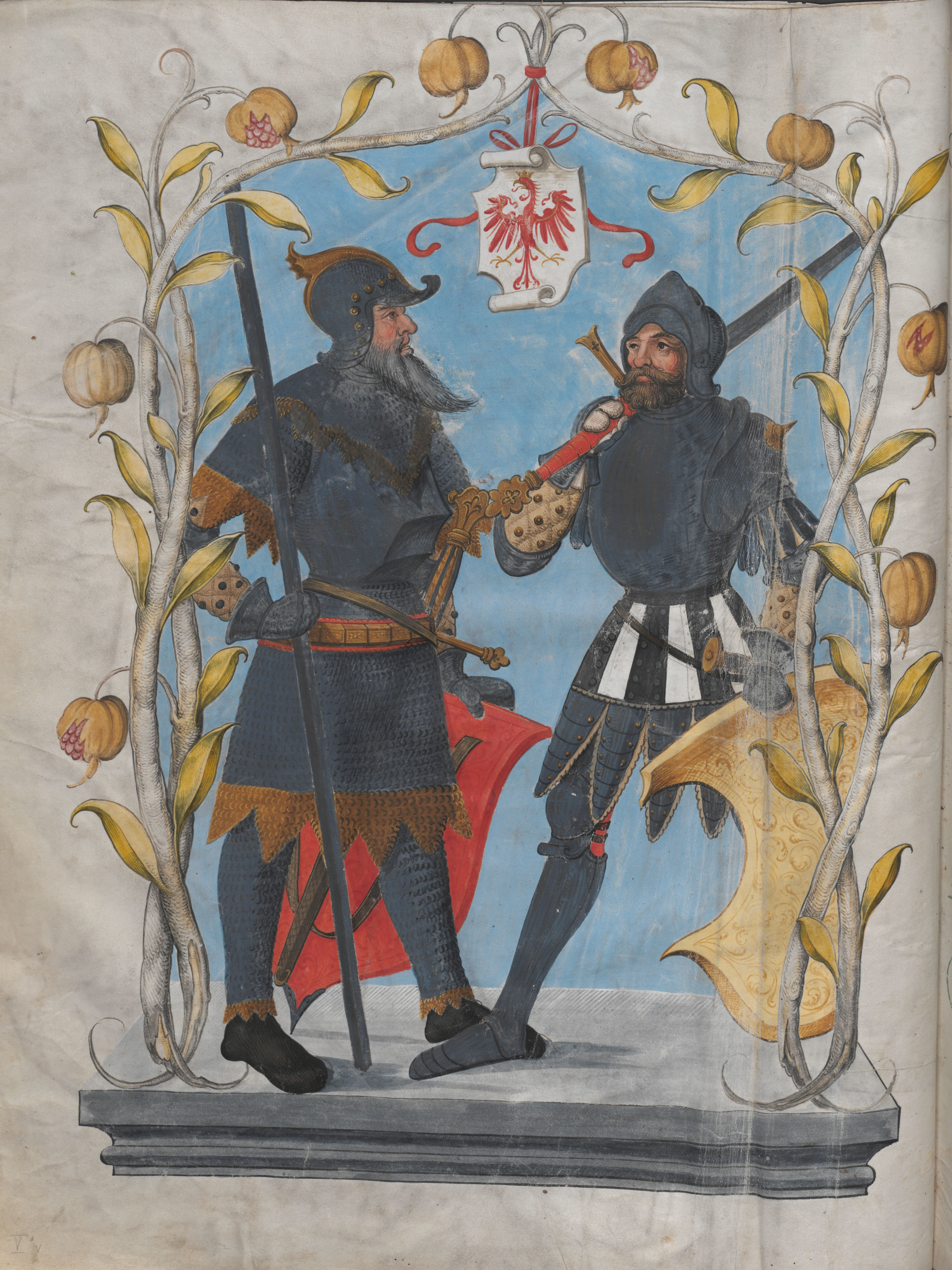
The Ambraser Heldenbuch, folio V*^{v}

The texts are written on 238 folios of parchment — 476 pages, each 460 x 360 mm in size, each folio numbered with Roman numerals in the top right-hand corner of the recto page.

Before the texts are four folios containing a list of contents and a separate sheet with a full-page illustration on the verso page showing two armed men beneath the arms of Tirol. These five additional sheets were added after the texts were completed and have been numbered I*–V*. The table of contents provides cross-references to the folio numbers in the main body of the manuscript.

The works (all are verse) are set out as prose in a three-column layout, with a punctus (•) to mark the end of a line of verse, or, in many cases, a colon marking the end of a rhyming couplet. Decorated initial letters mark the start of a work or chapter of a work. Lombardic capitals, alternating red and blue, indicate the start of a new strophe or section.

Many pages have illustrations on the outer and bottom margins. The right-hand margin of folio 215^{r} shows a naked woman playing a fiddle beside a shield with the date 1517 and the initials VF, which are assumed to be those of the artist, variously identified as Ulrich Funk or Valentin/Veit Fiedler.

== Contents ==
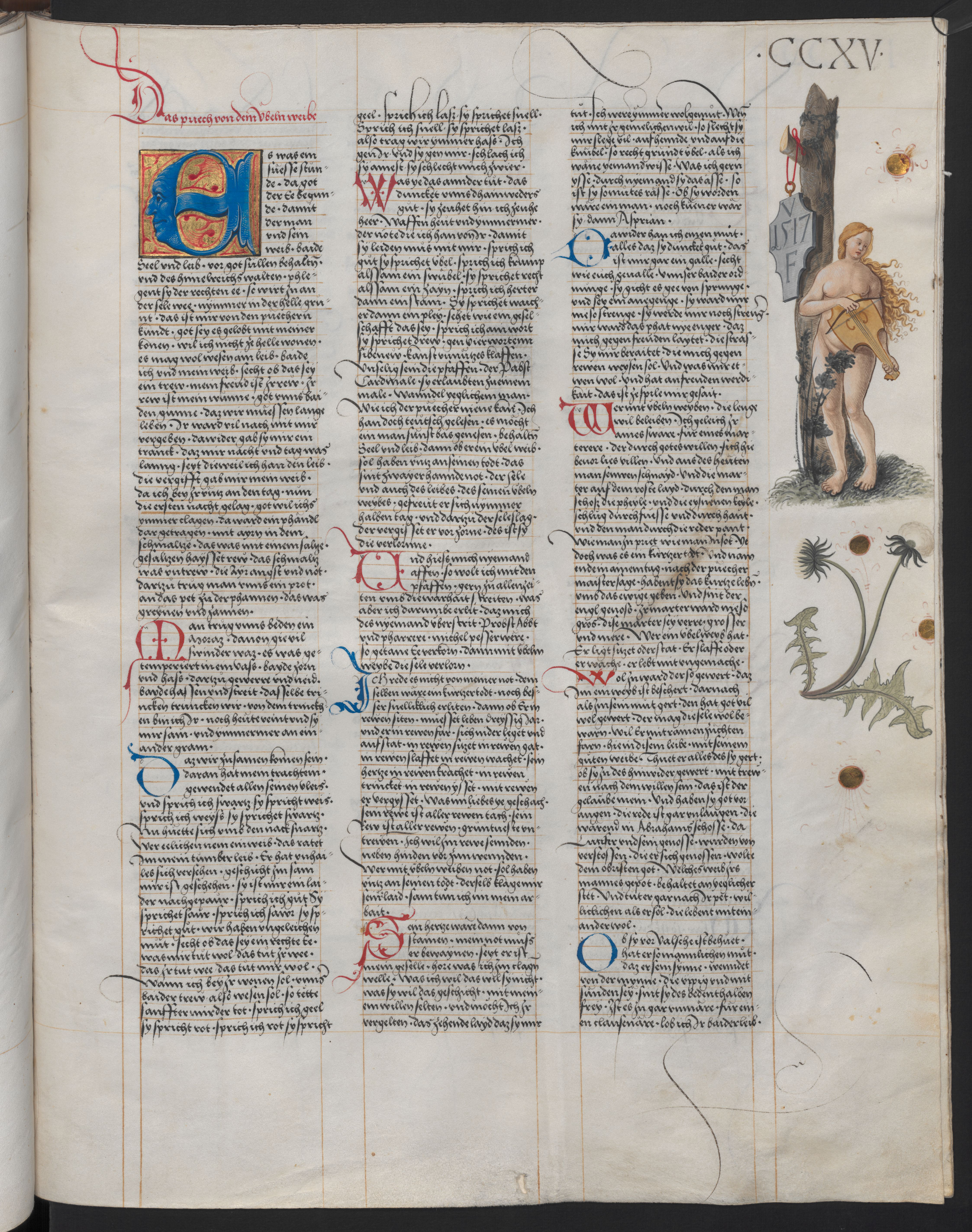
The Ambraser Heldenbuch, folio 215^{r}. The initials VF on the shield are assumed to be those of the artist.

The works in the manuscript are grouped by genre: courtly narratives (including all of Hartmann von Aue's secular narratives), heroic epics (including the Dietrich and Nibelungen legends), and shorter narratives of a mainly didactic nature. The two final works, fragments of Wolfram von Eschenbach's Titurel and a German translation of the Latin Epistola presbiteri Johannis fall outside this scheme.

The list of works below follows the order in the manuscript, giving the modern titles. (The headings in the manuscript are descriptions of the work and do not match modern titles or indicate authorship.)

=== Courtly narratives ===
- Der Stricker, Frauenehre (manuscript d)
- Moritz von Craon (sole surviving manuscript)
- Hartmann von Aue
  - Iwein (manuscript d)
  - Das Büchlein / Die Klage (sole surviving manuscript)
  - Das zweite Büchlein (sole surviving manuscript)
  - (Der Mantel)
  - Erec (only more or less complete manuscript)

=== Heroic epics ===
- Dietrichs Flucht (manuscript d)
- Rabenschlacht (manuscript d)
- Nibelungenlied (manuscript d)
- The Nibelungenklage (incomplete, manuscript d)
- Kudrun (sole surviving manuscript)
- Biterolf und Dietleib (sole surviving manuscript)
- Ortnit (manuscript A)
- Wolfdietrich A (sole surviving manuscript)

=== Shorter narratives ===
- Die böse Frau (sole surviving manuscript)
- Herrand von Wildonie
  - Die getreue Ehefrau (sole surviving manuscript)
  - Der verkehrte Wirt (sole surviving manuscript)
  - Der nackte Kaiser (sole surviving manuscript)
  - Die Katze (sole surviving manuscript)
- Ulrich von Liechtenstein, Frauenbuch (sole surviving manuscript)
- Wernher der Gartenaere, Meier Helmbrecht (manuscript A)
- Der Stricker, Pfaffe Amis (manuscript W)

=== Fragmentary texts ===
- Wolfram von Eschenbach, Titurel (fragment, manuscript H)
- Der Priester Johann (fragment, sole surviving manuscript)

== Language ==
Ambraser Heldenbuch's language is Early New High German. The work's orthography is Ried's own, although it bears the trace of the Bavarian dialect and Maximilianische Kanzleisprache (Maximilian's Chancery Language, in the forming of which Ried plays an important role). Thornton characterises Ried's language as "Tirolean written dialect of the age of Luther". It is consistent with the language of the Habsburg Imperial Chancery, though there are some idiosyncratic spellings.

In spite of the fact that Reid's texts must have come from a variety of sources, his orthography is relatively consistent between the individual works: variations between texts are minor, more likely reflecting gradual changes in his own orthography as the project progressed. This indicates that he must have made a conscious attempt to harmonise the spellings he found in his sources.

== Editions ==
A complete transcription of the Ambraser Heldenbuch in XML markup is available from the University of Innsbruck's "Ambraser Heldenbuch: Transcription and Scientific Dataset" site. The texts have been published on Open Access by de Gruyter in a series of eleven volumes, each containing transcriptions and facsimiles of a group of works.

- Klarer, Mario, ed. (2021). Ambraser Heldenbuch. Gesamttranskription mit Manuskriptbild. Berlin, Boston: de Gruyter.

In many editions of the individual texts the language of the 16th-century manuscript has been adapted into the idealised classical Middle High German of the 13th century, as established by 19th century editors.

Among the diplomatic editions of the texts are:

- Pretzel, Ulrich, ed. (1973). Moriz von Craûn. Altdeutsche Textbibliothek, 45 (4th ed.). Tübingen: Niemeyer. ISBN 348420069-3. (parallel text with manuscript and normalised versions on facing pages)
- Hartmann von Aue
  - Edrich, Brigitte, ed. (2014). "Hartmann von Aue: Erec, Handschrift A" (PDF). Hartmann von Aue Portal.
  - "Transcription of the 'Klage' Österreichische Nationalbibliothek: Vienna, Austria. Manuscript A (Cod. vindob. ser. nova 2663, Bl. 22rc - 26va)". Hartmann von Aue Portal.
  - Zutt, Herta, ed. (1968). Die Klage. Das (zweite) Büchlein aus dem Ambraser Heldenbuch. Berlin: de Gruyter.
- Pritz, Roswitha (2009). Das Nibelungenlied nach der Handschrift d des "Ambraser Heldenbuch" (Codex Vindobonensis Ser. nova 2663, Wien, Österreichische Nationalbibliothek); Transkription und Untersuchungen (PhD). University of Vienna.
- Bäuml, Franz H., ed. (1969). Kudrun. Die Handschrift. Berlin: de Gruyter.
- Ulrich von Lichtenstein (1993). Spechtler, Franz Viktor (ed.). Frauenbuch. Göppinger Arbeiten zur Germanistik, 520 (2nd ed.). Göppingen: Kümmerle. ISBN 3874527603.
- Schnyder, André, ed. (1980). Biterolf und Dietleib. Sprache und Dichtung. Forschungen zur deutschen Sprache, Literatur und Volkskunde. 31. Bern, Stuttgart: Haupt.

== See also ==
- Runkelstein Castle
- Early New High German
- Cultural depictions of Maximilian I, Holy Roman Emperor
