= Kudrun =

Middle High German heroic epic

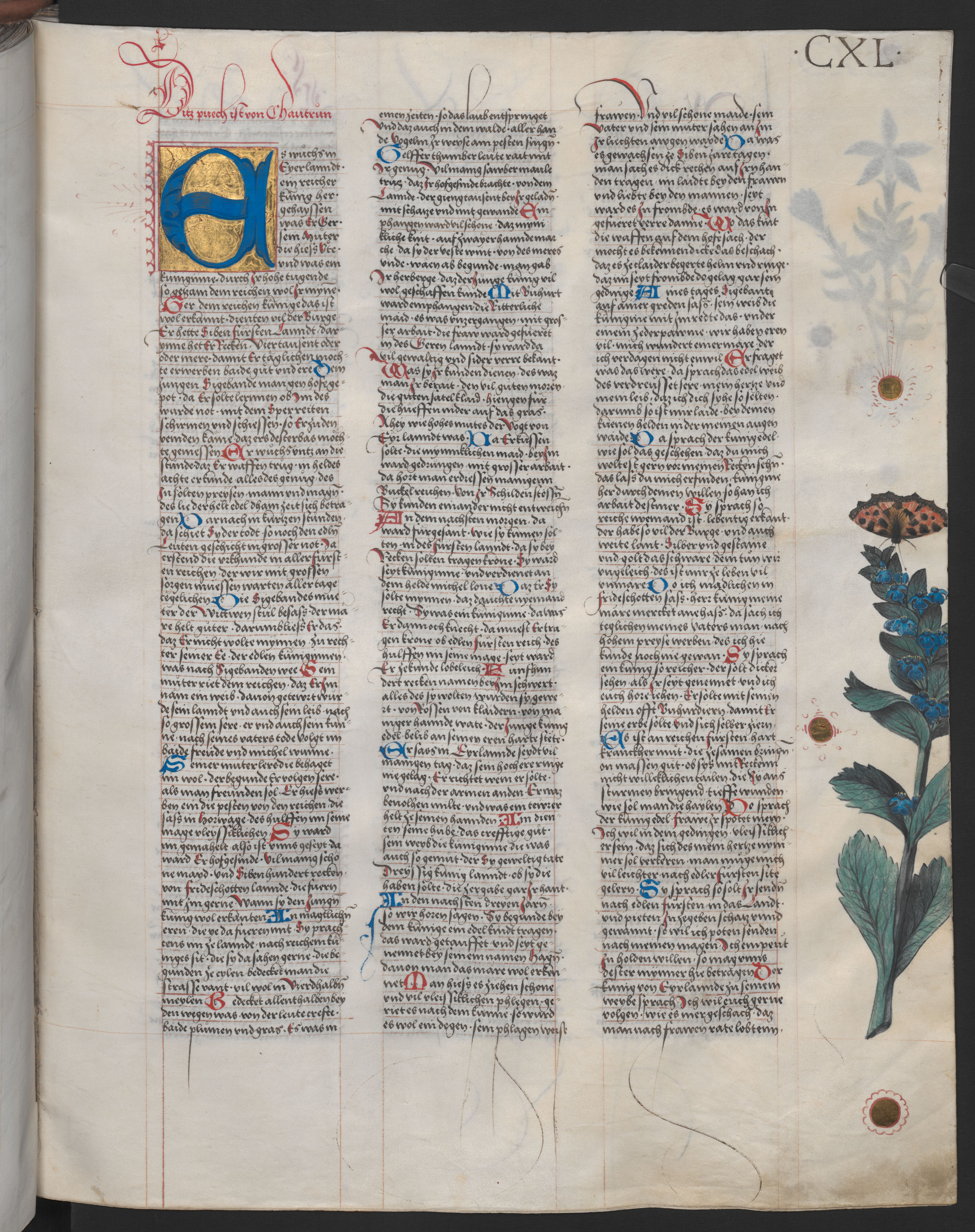
First page of Kudrun. Ambraser Heldenbuch, Austrian National Library Cod. ser. nova 2663 fol. 140t.

Kudrun (sometimes known as the Gudrunlied or Gudrun), is an anonymous Middle High German heroic epic. The poem was likely composed in either Austria or Bavaria around 1250. It tells the story of three generations of the ruling house of Hetelings on the North Sea, but is primarily the story of Kudrun, who is abducted by the Norman prince Hartmut who desires to marry her. Kudrun remains true to her fiancé Herwig and eventually is rescued. After the defeat of the Normans, however, Kudrun ensures that peace will be kept between the two peoples by arranging for marriages and alliances.

Although the story of Kudrun is very likely the invention of the poet, the story of her parents has its origins in a common Germanic tale known in Scandinavia as the Hjaðningavíg: it tells how Kudrun's mother, Hilde, eloped with her father, Hetel, against the will of Hilde's father, Hagen. In Kudrun, this originally tragic tale has been transformed into a happy one that serves as the prehistory of Kudrun herself.

The poem is notable for the important and active role played by its female characters. It is widely seen as a deliberate antithesis to the Nibelungenlied, to which it alludes in numerous ways.

Kudrun does not appear to have been successful with medieval audiences, and survives in only one manuscript. Since its rediscovery, however, it has been popular with philologists, and this has resulted in a relatively wide modern reception. Of German heroic poems, it has been called "second in stature only to the Nibelungenlied."

== Synopsis ==
The epic tells essentially three stories: the adventures of King Hagen, King Hetel's winning of Hilde, and the trials and triumphs of Princess Kudrun, the latter taking up three-quarters of the work.

Chapters 1-4: How Hagen becomes King of Ireland

In Ireland, Prince Sigebant marries a Norwegian princess, Uote, and becomes king. Three years later she bears him a son, Hagen.

At age seven Hagen is carried off to a faraway island by a wild griffin and given to its young. But one of the young is too greedy and flies off with the boy. In the process it accidentally lets him escape. Hagen flees until he finds three young maidens in a cave who have, themselves, escaped the griffins. They proceed to care for him until he is old enough to fend for himself.

Then one day, securing weapons and armor from a shipwreck, Hagen is able to single-handedly kill all the griffins. Some time later, after killing a dragon, he drinks its blood and gains superhuman strength and wisdom. Finally all of these young people are rescued by a passing ship. But when it becomes clear that those rescued are to be held for ransom, Hagen uses his strength to take control of the ship and force the crew to sail to Ireland.

There Hagen is reunited with his family and the rescued maidens join the royal court. Soon the young prince marries one of the maidens, Hilde of India. She is crowned queen when Hagen becomes king. Later she bears him a daughter, who is also named Hilde and who grows up to become famed for her beauty.

Chapters 5-8: How Hetel of Germany Woos Hilde of Ireland

A warrior king named Hetel rules the Hegelings (or Hetelings) in the area covered today by Northern Germany, Denmark, and the Netherlands. Having heard of Hilde's beauty, he desires to woo her to be his queen. But he is informed that King Hagen kills all her suitors. So he arranges for his kinsmen and vassals, under the leadership of Wate of Stormarn, to mount an expedition and abduct her.

The expedition sails in five ships. When the Hegelings land in Ireland they pose as merchants and exiled warriors. With rich gifts and chivalric ways they lull Hagen and his court into a false sense of security. Horant of Denmark, one of the Hegelings, sings so sweetly that he becomes the idol of the ladies. By these means Hilde and her entourage are lured down to the harbor to view the departing ships. Suddenly a group of warriors hidden in one of them emerges, Hilde and her ladies in waiting are abducted, and the ships all sail back to Germany.

Enraged, Hagen gathers his forces and soon launches a fleet to attack Hetel's lands. When he reaches the German shore he and his men are met with fierce opposition, including by Hetel himself. The two sides battle to a standstill. Then the conflict is resolved by a truce in which Hilde is betrothed to Hetel. A great wedding follows and Hilde becomes queen of the Hegelings. Hagen then returns to Ireland, laden with gifts and full of praises for how worthy Hetel is as the husband of his daughter.

Chapters 9-12: How Herwic of Sealand Woos Kudrun of Germany

Now it is Hetel's turn to become the father of a famously beautiful daughter who he feels compelled to protect from all suitors. That daughter is Kudrun, who along with her brother Ortwin, is born to Hetel and Hilde.

When Kudrun comes of age, Hetel refuses the suits of a Moorish king named Sifrit of Alzabey, a Norman prince named Hartmuot, and King Herwic of Sealand. Herwic thereupon raises an army of 3,000 and attacks Hetel. Hetel fights back with his own army. Soon Herwic and Hetel face each other one-on-one and fight to a standstill. By this point Kudrun has become smitten with the valiant Herwic and wishes to marry him. So Hetel grants her her wish. But Hilde decides to delay the wedding for a year while she prepares Kudrun to be a queen. And so Herwic must wait.

Chapters 13-19: How Kudrun Is Abducted

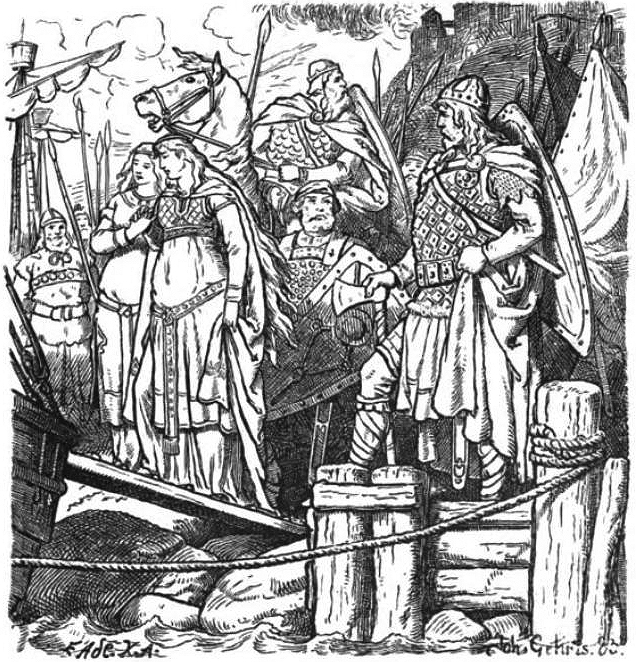
"Kudrun is led away imprisoned" (1885) by Johannes Gehrts.

During that interim period, the jealous King Sifrit invades Herwic's lands with an army of 80,000 and puts his kingdom to the torch. This forces Herwic to seek the aid of the Hegelings who, with Kudrun's prompting, come to his aid. Soon the combined forces are able to corner those of Sifrit and lay a year-long siege.

Meanwhile, the equally jealous Norman Prince Hartmuot gathers an army of 23,000 and invades Hetel's lands in his absence. There he abducts Kudrun. When Hetel learns of this, he makes alliance with Sifrit and then, with all of his allies, pursues Hartmuot to the island of Wulpensand off the Dutch coast.

The battle there, however, results in massive losses on both sides with no clear victor. But Hetel is killed. And Hartmuot is able to escape in the predawn hours with his remaining forces.

So Kudrun's kinsmen must return to the land of the Hegelings with the sad news that Hetel is dead, that Kudrun remains as Hartmuot's captive, and that their forces are now too weak to launch an invasion of the Norman lands. They will have to wait until the boys of the next generation come of age and are able to avenge the deaths of their fathers.

Chapters 20-21: How Kudrun Is Imprisoned

Meanwhile, Hartmuot and his warriors return home. There Kudrun and her ladies in waiting are introduced into the royal household. But because Kudrun declares she can never love Hartmuot and will always regard herself as a captive, she and her attendants are forced by Hartmuot's mother, Queen Gerlint, into the role of castle servants in an effort to break Kudrun's will. This goes on for eight years, but Kudrun remains firm. So Hartmuot asks his sister to take over and try kindness instead. The result is the same: Kudrun never stops refusing to become Hartmuot's queen. So Gerlint takes over again and Kudrun is forced to become the castle washerwoman.

Chapters 22-29: How Kudrun is Finally Freed

It isn’t until thirteen years after Hetel's death that Kudrun's mother, Queen Hilde, declares the time has finally come to invade the Norman kingdom. All of her vassals answer the call, as well as King Herwic, assembling an army of 70,000 that is soon joined by 10,000 more from King Sifrit. The combined forces then set out, pausing at Wulpensand to honor those who died there. Unfortunately, bad weather sends the invasion fleet off course into the Sea of Darkness and near Mount Aetna's magnetic cliffs, where the whole campaign is put in great jeopardy. Yet the ships manage to reach the Norman kingdom and the troops land without being seen.

Making a reconnaissance, Herwic, with Kudrun's brother Ortwin, find Kudrun washing clothes by the sea. They don’t immediately recognize her but conversation soon reveals the truth. So they promise they will return the next day to rescue her along with her handmaidens.

Armed with this promise, Kudrun takes action to properly prepare herself. She announces to the Normans that she has finally decided to relent and marry Hartmuot, but can do so only if she and her entourage are allowed to bathe, don proper clothes, and get a good night's sleep. These wishes are readily granted and the princess and her ladies are restored to their former status and appearance.

Meanwhile, during the night, Wate directs the invading forces to sneak up close to the Norman castle so the attack can be launched suddenly at dawn. Then, as day breaks, the invaders form their lines. In response, Hartmuot musters his troops and marches out of the castle to face his enemies head on. Bloody fighting quickly erupts, with massive casualties on both sides, until Hartmuot determines it would be prudent to retire. But now his men are far from the walls and must fight their way back to gates blocked by the invaders. In this struggle he is soon locked in combat with Wate.

At this point, Queen Gerlint in the Norman castle orders Kudrun killed. But Hartmuot, though outside the castle, manages to prevent this. So Kudrun, shouting from a castle window, begs Herwic to intervene between Hartmuot and Wate to stop the fighting. This Herwic does, allowing Hartmuot to be captured instead of killed. But Wate becomes enraged by this and has his troops fight their way into the castle and sack it. Kudrun is rescued and Gerlint is beheaded.

Chapters 30-32: How Kudrun Restores Peace

After Hartmuot's entire realm has been conquered, the invasion force returns to the land of the Hegelings with its captives and shiploads of booty. There Queen Hilde greets them royally. Kudrun then arranges for a great reconciliation in which her brother Ortwin marries Hartmuot's sister, Hartmuot marries Kudrun's close companion, Sifrit marries Herwic's sister, and Herwic, of course, marries Kudrun. All four are wed the same day. Then the four kings—Ortwin, Hartmuot, Sifrit, and Herwic—hold a great festival at Hilde's castle.

After this, Hartmuot and his bride are escorted back to the Norman kingdom where he is reinstated as ruler. Herwic's sister leaves with Sifrit to the Moorish kingdom. And Kudrun bids her mother and brother farewell as she departs with Herwic to Sealand.

== Authorship, dating, and transmission ==
In common with almost all other German heroic poems, the Kudrun is anonymous. The poem is only transmitted in the early 16th-century Ambraser Heldenbuch, but it is conventionally dated to around 1250. The scribe of that manuscript has modernized the language of the poem, but he has done it in such a way that the text is often incomprehensible unless translated back into Middle High German. The earliest date that it could have been composed is around 1240; the author has to have known the Nibelungenlied and the text portrays the relationship between kings and vassals in a manner suggestive of Emperor Frederick II's Statutum in favorem principum. Although the story takes place on the North Sea, the author of the poem does not seem well acquainted with maritime geography; further proof that he was not familiar with the ocean comes from his portrayal of Kudrun washing clothes in the sea. This accords with the linguistic analysis of the poem, which locates it in the Austro-Bavarian dialect area; potential places of composition include Styria and Regensburg.

== Origins ==
The first half of the Kudrun is a reworking of a common Germanic oral tradition that likely has its origins around the North Sea, with the portrayal of warfare being similar to that of the Viking Age. Based on the forms of names found in the text, this tradition likely reached the southern German-speaking area where the Kudrun was composed via the Dutch-Flemish language area and potentially through a Romance-speaking area.

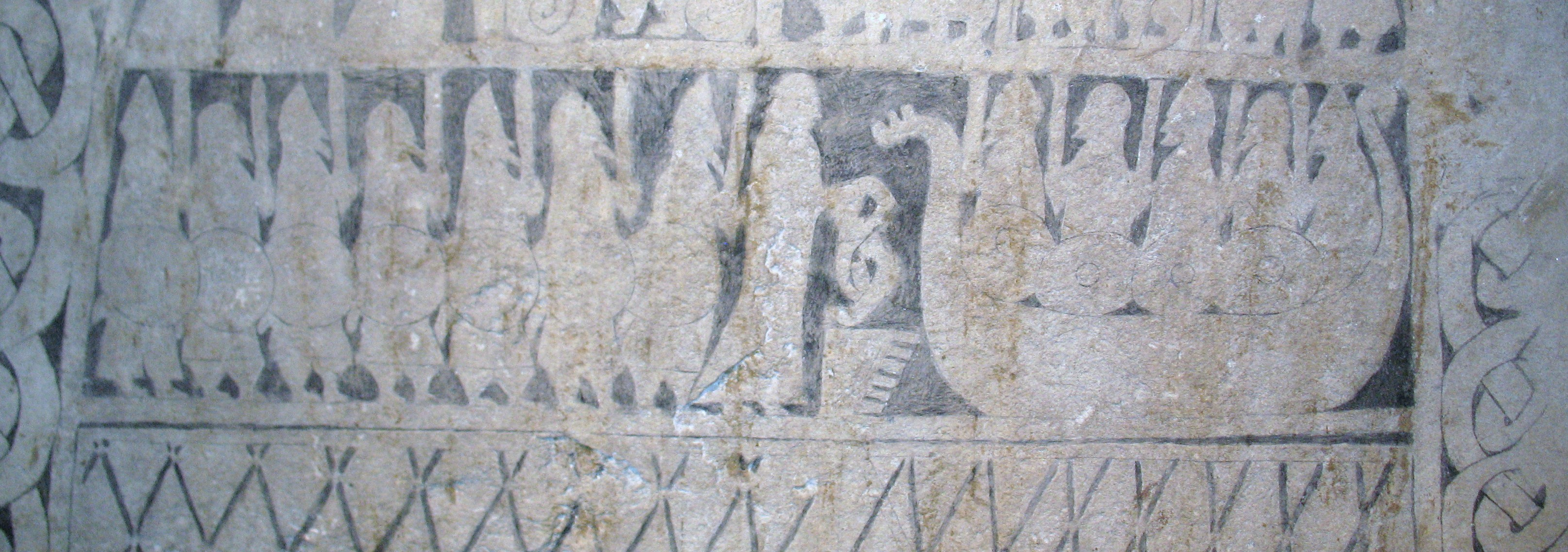
Hildr attempts to mediate, on the picture stone Smiss (I)

The core of this tradition is the story of Hilde's abduction and a battle on an island between her father Hagen and her abductor Hetel. This tradition is attested in Germany as early as the middle of the 12th century, when a fierce battle on the island Wolfenwerde (in Kudrun, Wülpensand) is mentioned in Priest Lambrecht's Alexanderroman: "Hilde's father" is said to perish in the battle, and the names Hagen and Wate are given. The version of events reported by Priest Lambrecht accords generally with other attestations, namely from Scandinavia, where it is known as Hjaðningavíg. Snorri Sturluson reports two versions of the tale in the Prose Edda: in one, Hildr (Hilde) attempts to mediate between her father Högni (Hagen) and Heðin (Hetel) during the battle and awakens the dead to life every night. In another, quoted from the poem Ragnarsdrápa, Hildr encourages the fight and prevents its end. Another version is reported by Saxo Grammaticus. The earliest attestation of the saga appears to be a picture stone (Smiss I) from Gotland, Sweden, which shows a woman attempting to mediate between warriors on land and on a ship. The saga is also attested in Anglo-Saxon England of the 9th and 10th centuries, where the poems Deor and Widsith mention the names Hagena (Hagen), Heoden (Hetel), Wada (Wate), and Heorrenda (Horant) without, however, giving any indication of their story.

The German Kudrun differs from the Norse versions and the version found in Priest Lambrecht in that Hilde is able to successfully mediate between Hagen and Hetel, transforming the story of Hilde into prologue to the story of her daughter, Kudrun. The story of Kudrun herself was likely the invented by the poet based on the story of Hilde, as there are no independent attestations of Kudrun. It is nevertheless not possible to prove that there were no oral traditions about Kudrun. The name Kudrun shows signs of having migrated with the oral tradition south to Baviara/Austria: it would be *Gundrūn if it had arisen in the High German area. The form *Gudrun may be of Dutch origin and probably derives from the Old Norse Guðrún (see Gudrun). It is unclear whether the poem's German speaking audience was aware that Kudrun's name was equivalent to the Norse version of Kriemhild or whether the name has some other explanation.

The story of Hagen's youth in the wilderness is thought to have been invented by the poet using motifs taken from Herzog Ernst, the Nibelungenlied, and Wolfram von Eschenbach's Parzival.

== Themes and interpretation ==
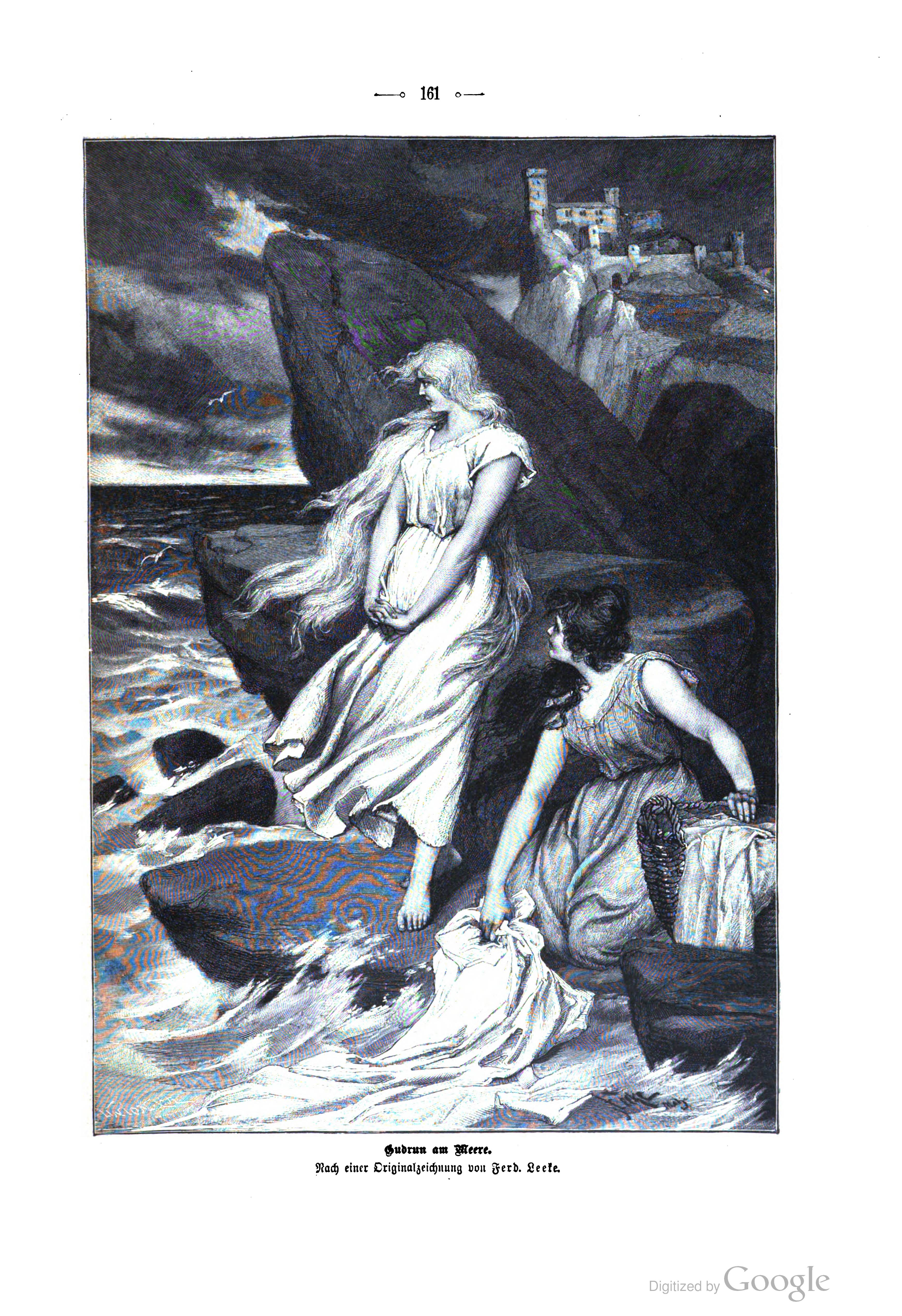
Kudrun washes clothes at the seashore. From Die Gartenlaube (1899)

The Kudrun is widely seen as a deliberate reversal of the situation of the Nibelungenlied: the poem cites the Nibelungenlied in its metrical form, in its use of âventiuren (chapters, literally "adventures") to distinguish individual episodes, and its use of allusions and direct citations of lines of the other poem. Kudrun herself is seen as a reversal of Kriemhild in the Nibelungenlied: instead of revenge and destruction, Kudrun brings about peace and reconciliation. Gerlint, however, receives Kriemhild's epithet vâlentinne (Kudrun 629,4; "she-devil"), while Wate seems to combine features of the Nibelungenlied's portrayal of Hagen and Hildebrand. While the antithesis to the Nibelungenlied is especially obvious in the role played by Kudrun herself, the male family members also show themselves to be much more pragmatic than the heroes in the Nibelungenlied.

The central topic of Kudrun is reconciliation, a reconciliation which is secured through the marriage of members of formerly feuding families. The poem features female protagonists who are far more active than is typical; in particular, Kudrun herself intervenes repeatedly to prevent bloodshed and to secure peace. Kudrun's mother Hilde is also an active female figure, who rules in her own right following Hetel's death; Kudrun and Hilde are together responsible for the success of Kudrun's attempts to create a lasting peace. The poem nevertheless does not call male rule into question: female power is unable to challenge male power and is always based in prior suffering.

== Metrical form and style ==
The Kudrun is written in a variant of the stanza used in the Nibelungenlied; the stanza consists of four lines. The first three lines consist of three metrical feet, a caesura, and an additional three metrical feet. The fourth line adds an additional two metrical feet after the caesura. The lines rhyme in couplets. The first rhyming couplet has a "masculine" rhyme (a single stressed syllable). The second couplet has a "feminine" rhyme (a stressed syllable followed by an unstressed one). The word before the caesura is typically feminine, and there are frequently words that rhyme between the caesuras of a couplet. The following, stanza 699 taken from Uta Störmer-Caysa's edition, is an example of this stanza type. || represents the caesura:

Dô si ím ze helfe komen, || Herwîge und sínen man,
dô was im misselungen. || swes er ie began,
dar en er schaden grôzen || vil oft muoste enphahen
mit sînen strîtgenôzen. || si riten sînem bürgetor vil nahen.

A number of stanzas are written in the same form as the Nibelungenlied.

The aesthetic of Kudrun can be described as a montage of various elements from various genres and texts. This technique results in a certain degree of inconsistency in the poem. The poem is also notable for its use of memorable poetic description of images and gestures.

== Influence and legacy ==
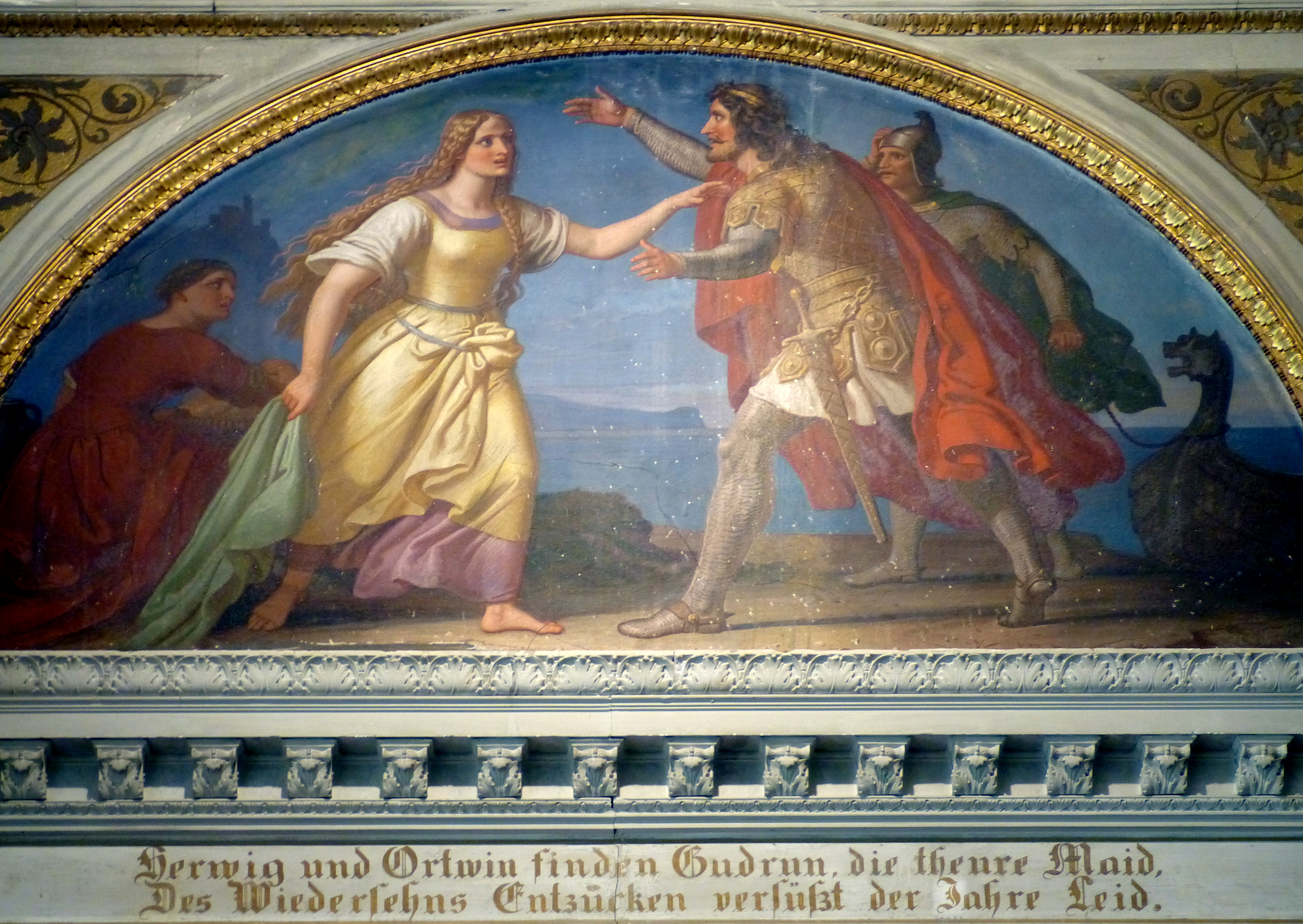
Ortwin and Herwig find Kudrun. Painting from 1851 in Schwerin Castle

The Kudrun does not appear to have been a very popular poem in the Middle Ages; it is never alluded to elsewhere and it survives only in a single manuscript. Its lack of influence may have to do with the fact that it is a more consciously literary text than the Nibelungenlied or the other late medieval heroic epics about Dietrich von Bern. There are nevertheless certain areas where influence from Kudrun has been proposed: the Old Yiddish Dukus Horant and various ballads.

Dukus Horant, which involves characters from the Hilde part of Kudrun, more likely is an independent reworking of the Hilde saga than of Kudrun. For a lack of a direct connection between the two epics speaks Dukus Horant's use of the name "Etene" for Hetel; this more closely matches the Old Norse and Anglo-Saxon material than Kudrun.

Several ballads in various European languages show parallels to Kudrun's captivity and rescue, with German examples being the Südeli ballads (18th century) and the Meererin (written down 1867). Their relationship to Kudrun is uncertain and most scholars now believe that it is more likely that the parallels show that the author of the Kudrun reworked traditional folk elements in composing the second half of the poem.

Perhaps for the same reasons that the epic was unpopular as heroic poetry in the Middle Ages, namely its literary character, the Kudrun became extremely popular with 19th-century philologists. This resulted in the work being adapted several times. In 1868, author Mathilde Wesendonck published a play Gudrun, which was among her more popular pieces and which Johannes Brahms offered to base an opera on. Several operas based on the poem were actually completed: Carl Amand Mangold completed one in 1849, as did Oscar Block in 1865, August Reissmann in 1871, Felix Draeseke in 1883, and Hans Huber in 1894.

== Editions ==
- Bartsch, Karl, ed. (1880). Kudrun (4 ed.). Leipzig: Brockhaus.
- Symons, Barend, ed. (1914). Kudrun (2 ed.). Halle (Saale): Niemeyer.
- Bäuml, Franz H., ed. (1969). Kudrun; die Handschrift. Berlin: de Gruyter.
- Stackmann, Karl, ed. (2000). Kudrun: nach der Ausgabe von Karl Bartsch. Tübingen: Niemeyer. ISBN 3484212152.
- Störmer-Caysa, Uta, ed. (2010). Kudrun: Mittelhochdeutsch/Neuhochdeutsch. Stuttgart: Reclam. ISBN 9783150186398.

== Translations and retellings ==
=== English ===
- Almedingen, E. M. (1967). The Story of Gudrun; based on the Third Part of the Epic of Gudrun. New York: W. W. Norton.
- Letherbrow, Emma (1864). Gudrun: A Story of the North Sea. Edinburgh: Edmonston & Douglas.
- Gudrun: A Medieval Epic. Translated by Nichols, Mary Pickering. New York and Boston: Houghton, Mifflin and Company. 1889.
- Upton, George P. (1906). Gudrun. Chicago: A. C. McClurg & Co.
- Kudrun: translated with an introduction and notes. Translated by Murdoch, Brian. London and Melbourne: Dent. 1987. ISBN 0460014307.
- Kudrun. Translated by McConnel, Winder. Columbia, SC: Camden House. 1992. ISBN 1879751127.
- Kudrun. Translated by Gibbs, Marion and Johnson, Sidney. New York: Garland. 1992. ISBN 978-0-8240-5535-6
- Kudrun: With the Book of King Otnit and the Book of Wolf Dietrich. Translated by Whobrey, William T. Indianapolis: Hackett Publishing. 2025. ISBN 978-1-64792-210-8

=== Modern German ===
- Gudrun: Deutsches Heldenlied. Translated by Simrock, Karl. Stuttgart: Cotta. 1866.
- Kudrun: Ein mittelalterliches Heldenepos. Translated by Joachim Lindner. Berlin: Verlag der Nation. 1971.
- Kudrun. Translated by Sowinski, Bernhard. Stuttgart: Reclam. 1995.
