= Alpharts Tod =

Anonymous medieval German poem

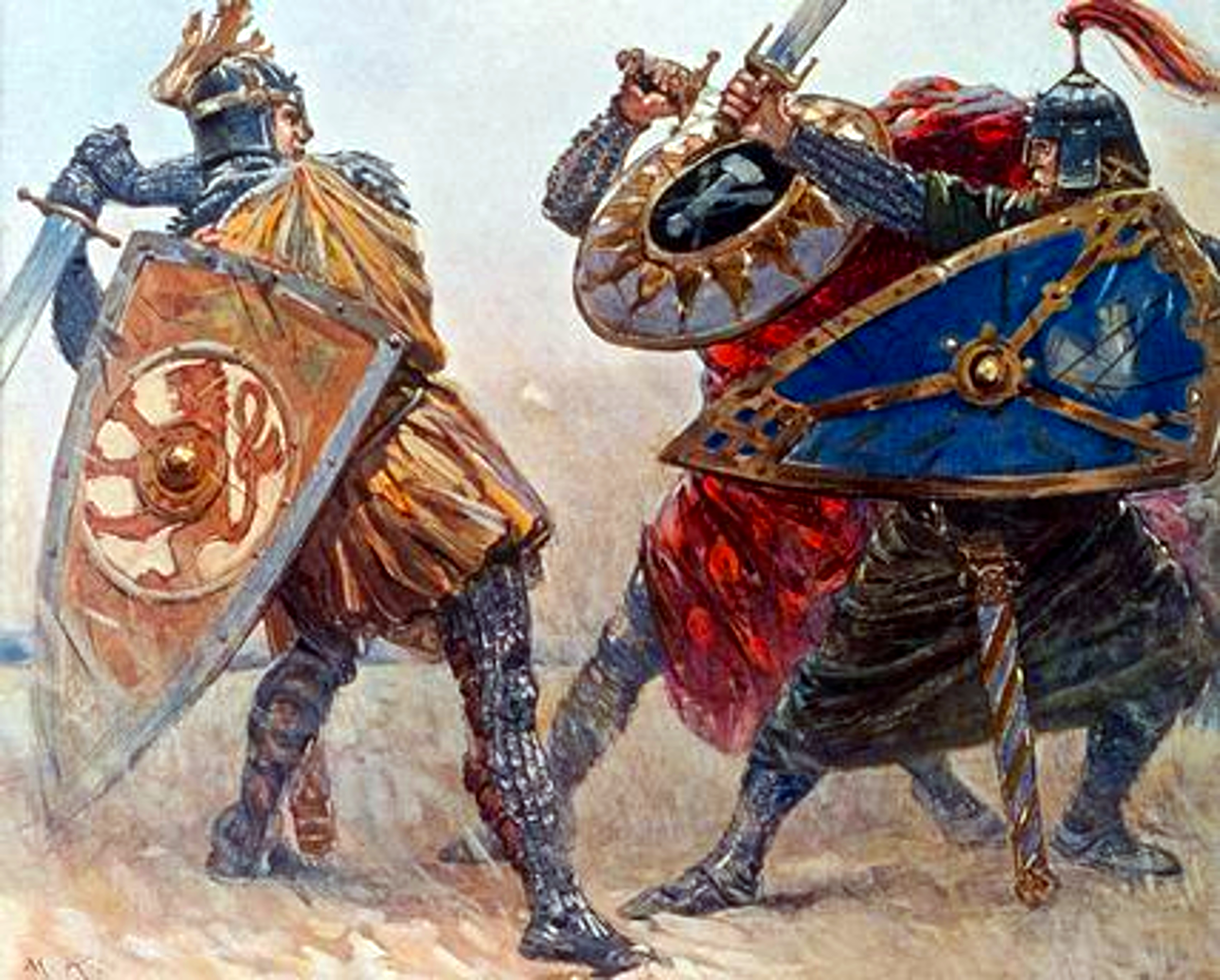
Alphart battles Wittich and Heime.

Alpharts Tod (The Death of Alphart) is an anonymous late medieval Middle High German poem in the poetic cycle of the hero Dietrich von Bern, the counterpart of the historical Ostrogothic king Theodoric the Great in Germanic heroic legend. It is part of the so-called "historical" Dietrich material. It may have written as early as between 1245 and 1300, but it is only transmitted in a single manuscript from around 1470 or 1480. The place of composition is unknown.

Alpharts Tod concerns the young hero Alphart, one of Dietrich's heroes and the nephew of Hildebrand, at the start of a war between Dietrich and his uncle Ermenrich. Alphart insists on riding out alone, and while he is brave and a powerful warrior, he eventually encounters Witege and Heime, two traitors who have switched sides to Ermenrich. They kill him in a dishonorable fashion; Ermenrich, meanwhile, fails to defeat Dietrich.

== Summary ==
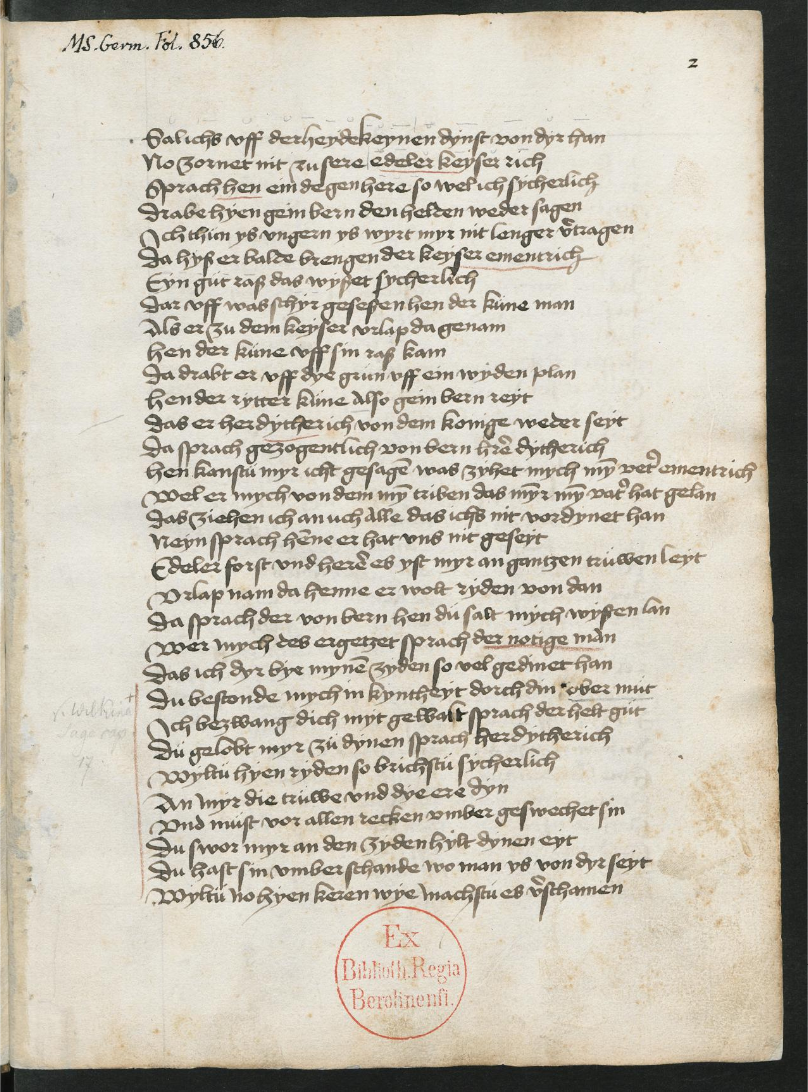
First page of Alpharts Tod. Staatsbibliothek Berlin Ms. germ. fol. 856 fol. 2r.

The beginning of the epic is missing. Emperor Emenrich tells Heime to bring Ermenrich's declaration of war to Dietrich. Heime rides to Bern (Verona) to declare war, but is unable to explain the reason for Ermenrich's declaration when asked. Dietrich reminds Heime that the latter had once sworn an oath of loyalty to him. Heime declares that both he and his companion Witege will fight for Ermenrich, but will not attack Dietrich himself. Heime then brings Ermenrich Dietrich's response: Dietrich will fight. Ermenrich orders his men to scout around Bern. Heime attempts to convince Ermenrich to abandon his plan to drive Dietrich into exile, but to no avail.

Meanwhile, Dietrich has assembled his own army. Alphart, the brother of Dietrich's companion Wolfhart, recommends scouting out the enemy and volunteers to do it alone himself, ignoring attempts to convince him to let a more experienced warrior do it. His step mother Ute, wife of Hildebrand, gives him armor, weapons, and a horse. His young wife Amelgart begs him not to go or at least bring a companion, but Alphart insists on going alone. Hildebrand rides after him secretly in order to defeat Alphart and bring him back him, but Alphart defeats Hildebrand, and chooses to ride on. Hildebrand rides back to Bern and tells of his defeat.

Meanwhile, Alphart encounters Ermenrich's scouting troop of 80 men, killing all but eight who flee and tell Ermenrich. Ermenrich wishes to send a new scouting party, but no one will go. Finally, Ermenrich demands that Witege ride out. When Witege sees Alphart, however, he is filled with dread and nearly turns around before riding to Alphart. Alphart accuses Witege of treason and the two fight; Alphart is able to throw Witege to the ground where he lies unconscious. Alphart decides not to kill him as he is defenseless. Heime, however, has observed the battle and hurries to help Witege. There is a lacuna. Heime, Alphart, and Witege are now talking: Heime suggests breaking off the battle, so that he and Witege can return to Ermenrich and Alphart to Dietrich. Alphart refuses, however, insisting on taking Witege back to Bern as a prisoner. At this point, Witege and Heime both attack Alphart at once. Alphart only requests that they not attack him from behind. After a bit of fighting, he asks them only to attack him one at a time. They agree, but when Heime is nearly defeated Witege intervenes, attacking Alphart from behind, and Witege thereby kills Alphart.

There is another lacuna. Hildebrand and Dietrich's man Nitger have ridden to Breisach and are received by Eckehart, who agrees to help Dietrich against Ermenrich. He brings Walter of Aquitaine and other heroes with him. They form a large army and march to Italy. At night, Hildebrand encounters two of Ermenrich's warriors; this awakens the whole army, and they defeat Ermenrich's forces. When they arrive at Bern, however, they are mistaken for Ermenrich's forces. Wolfhart rides out to attack Hildebrand, but Hildebrand reveals his identity and the allied army is received well by Dietrich. Meanwhile, Ermenrich learns of the new army and sends his forces to try to prevent their arrival at Bern. In the ensuing battle, Dietrich seeks Witege and Heime, who have broken the heraldic devices from their shields and helmets so as not to be recognized. Ermenrich is defeated and Dietrich wins a lot of booty, and the allied army returns to Breisach.

== Transmission, dating, and composition ==
Like almost all German heroic poems, Alpharts Tod is anonymous. In its current incomplete form, the poem has 469 stanzas of 4 lines. The poem is usually dated to the second half of the thirteenth century, but its style suggests that it may be a newer version of an older poem. This older poem was most likely composed after Dietrichs Flucht. It is impossible to tell where the text was composed, however it is possible that it was composed in the western part of Austria.

Alpharts Tod is transmitted in a single paper manuscript from the fifteenth century that was split into three parts in the eighteenth century. The part containing Alpharts Tod contains a number of lacunae, meaning that only 3/4 of the work is preserved. The three parts of the manuscript are now housed in three different libraries:

- Staatsbibliothek Berlin, Ms. germ. 2° 856: "Alpharts Tod"
- Hessische Landes- und Hochschulbibliothek Darmstadt, Hs. 4257: Nibelungenlied, version n
- Hessische Landes- und Hochschulbibliothek Darmstadt, Hs. 4314: Johann von Würzburg "Wilhelm von Österreich"

Most likely, another text proceeded Alpharts Tod in the manuscript. The copy of the Nibelungenlied in the manuscript is marked as having been written in 1449, but the watermarks on the paper indicate that the manuscript is from 1470/80.

== Themes ==
Alpharts Tod is often read as a poem about youthful stupidity regarding heroism: the young Alphart, though brave, strong, and courteous, ignores all advice in order to prove his heroism and dies as a result. Moreover, Alphart is presented with multiple opportunities to save himself, yet each time he refuses. However, Heinzle notes that Alphart's behavior is never condemned, in contrast to his weak and cowardly opponents Witege and Heime: rather, it seems to glorify in his heroic aristeia and grow sentimental at his loss. Werner Hoffmann shares a similar opinion: the poem presents a genuine representation of the old heroic ethos, although its moral code of battle (only one may fight against one at a time, etc.) is certainly derived from ideas of chivalry. The combination of death in battle with glory, on the other hand, is clearly a heroic ideal.

Witege and Heime are directly contrasted with Alphart: whereas Alphart spares the unconscious Witege, the latter stabs him in the back and kills him once he is defenseless. Witege and Heime's scruples about breaking the rules that Alphart sets out shows them to acknowledge their validity. The narrator is explicit that Witege's actions have broken "God's law." Hoffmann argues that Alphart represents a "purer" heroic and chivalric ethos of battle that is contrasted with the more "modern" ethos of Witege and Heime and that should serve as an example and lament for the poet's own day. The two opponents nevertheless are not described as pure evil, but are rather given a subtle characterization, with their conflict of loyalty between Ermenrich and Dietrich specifically mentioned. Heinzle suggests that the audience may have any easier time identifying with Witege and Heime, who are willing to compromise and reconcile, than with Alphart. Elisabeth Lienert suggests that Hildebrand personifies a more pragmatic form of heroism that is less self-destruction than Alphart's, and is thus more of a model for behavior.

The poem offers a sort of alternative to the events described in Dietrichs Flucht: instead of Ermenrich inviting Dietrich to visit him with the intent to kill him, Ermenrich openly declares war. And instead of succeeding in driving Dietrich into exile, Ermenrich fails. The poem maintains the themes of the relationship between lord and vassal found in Dietrichs Flucht and the Rabenschlacht, but Dietrich is portrayed as experienced and successful. His enemies nevertheless escape, leaving the text open for further episodes.

== Metrical form ==
Like most German heroic poems, Alpharts Tod is written in stanzas that were meant to be sung and accompanied by music. It uses "Langzeilen" in the same stanza form as the Nibelungenlied, however some stanzas are more similar to the "Hildebrandston." This could be deliberate, or the result of later reworking of the text. Heinzle prints the following stanza as in the Nibelungen stanza, in which the first three lines consist of three metrical feet, a caesura, then three additional metrical feet, the fourth line adding a fourth foot after the caesura:

Des antwort jm geswinde || der herzoch Wolffing zu hant
"da habe ich von dem keyser || güt vnd lant,
jch han den solt entphangen, || das lechte golt so rot,
wan er myr gebüdet, || so müß ich ryden in dye not."

The basic rhyme scheme is: AABB. In every third stanza or so, rhymes also occur at the caesura in the first two lines:

A||B
A||B
X||C
X||C

The following stanza is given as an example of the "Hildebrandston", in which the fourth half line after the caesura is the same length as the other half lines:

Also der lyechte morgen || an den hymel kam,
da stont vff myt sorgen || der forst lobesam,
der degen küne, || als jne dye sorge betzwang.
wan jm dye helde kemen, || dye wile was jm lang.

== Relation to the oral tradition ==
Alpharts Tod is usually not seen as having existed previously in the oral tradition. Alphart's encounter with Witege, as recounted in the poem, is referenced in a fifteenth-century version of the Rosengarten zu Worms, however, Heinzle notes that this does not mean that story is very old. Further evidence for an absence of oral tales about Alphart is found in the fact that Alphart does not appear in the Thidrekssaga. More likely, the poem was inspired by the death of the hero Alphart in Dietrichs Flucht, where he is said to have died twice.

The poem nevertheless makes numerous allusions to other Dietrich poems and stories about Dietrich. For instance, the poem mentions Dietrich and Heime's liberation from Montare, which could refer to the Muter episode in the Virginal and is similar to an episode recorded in the Old English Waldere. It might also reference Dietrich's defeat of Heime before the latter joined Dietrich's service, which is recorded in the Thidrekssaga. The poem is notable in that it is the only "historical" Dietrich poem that does not result in Dietrich entering exile: it also shows an attempt to connect various Dietrich poems into a cycle.

== Editions ==
- Martin, Ernest, ed. (1866). "Alpharts Tod". Deutsches Heldenbuch. Vol. 2. Berlin: Weidmann. pp. 1–54.
- Lienert, Elisabeth; Meyer, Viola, eds. (2007). Alpharts Tod; Dietrich und Wenezlan. Tübingen: Niemeyer. ISBN 9783484645035.
