= Dukus Horant =

14th-century Judeo-German narrative poem

First page of the Dukus Horant manuscript

Dukus Horant is a 14th-century narrative poem in Judeo-German (Proto-Yiddish).

== Importance ==
Dukus Horant is the best known of a number of works which survive in the Cambridge Codex T.-S.10.K.22. This manuscript was discovered in the Cairo Geniza in 1896, and contains a collection of narrative poems in a variant of Middle High German, written in Hebrew characters. There is some controversy over the extent to which the manuscript's language differs from the commonly spoken German of the time, but it is agreed there is a strong Jewish colouring to it. Therefore, these are the oldest known works (apart from a few short inscriptions dated to the 13th century) in the Ashkenazi Jewish vernacular which later developed into Yiddish.

Dukus Horant is a heroic epic with thematic similarities to the German poem Kudrun. It is thus a good example of the transfer of literary material between the Christian and Jewish communities in the German-speaking lands in the later Middle Ages; by contrast, the other works in the manuscript contain traditional Jewish material.

== Plot ==
The poem tells how Duke Horant is sent by King Etene to Greece, probably to Constantinople, to win the hand of the princess Hilde. However Hilde's father, the fierce Greek king Hagen, is not willing to give his daughter to Etene until Horant has proved his prowess in a series of adventures.

== Form ==
Dukus Horant is composed in four-line rhymed strophes, the first and second line of each strophe being distichal. Though distichal verse forms are typical of classical Hebrew verse, these are more closely reminiscent of the distichal forms of old Germanic heroic verse. The language and form can be seen from the following transcription of the opening strophe, given first in the original (Hebrew characters and transliterated), then in an analogous Middle High German version and a translation by Dunphy.

עש ווש אין טוצן ריכן	איין קוינק וויט ארקנט
איין דעגן אלזא קונא	איטנא ווש ער גננט
ער ווש מילדא און שונא
ער טרוק דער אירן קרונא

‘s uus ’in tužn rikn	’iin quniq uuit ’rqnt
’iin d‘gn ’ls’ qun’	’itn’ uus ‘r gnnt
‘r uus mild’ ’un sun’
‘r truq d‘r ’irn qrun’

Ez waz in tiutschen rîchen	ein kunic wît erkant,
ein degen alsô kuone	Etene waz er genant.
Er waz milde unde schône,
er truog der êren krône.

[There was in German lands	a famous king,
a most valliant hero	Etene was his name
He was generous and fair
and bore the crown of honor.]

== Editions ==
- L. Fuks, The Oldest Known Literary Documents of Yiddish Literature (c. 1382), Leiden: Brill, 1957.
- P.F. Ganz, F. Norman and W. Schwarz (ed.), Dukus Horant (Altdeutsche Textbibliothek, Ergänzungsreihe 2), Tübingen: Niemeyer 1964.

== Literature ==
- James W. Marchand: Einiges zur sogenannten „Jiddischen Kudrun“. Neophilologus 45/1961, S. 55–63.
- G. Dunphy, "Literary Transitions: From 1300-1500", in: Max Reinhart (ed.), Early Modern German Literature (= The Camden House History of German Literature, vol. 4), Rochester NY & Woodbridge: Camden, 2007, pp. 43-87, here pp. 74-78.
