= Vidigoia =

4th-century Gothic warrior

Vidigoia was a Thervingian Gothic warrior. His name means either "the man from the forest zone" or "the forest-barker/wolf".

Vidigoia figured during the campaigns of Roman Emperor Constantine the Great across the Danube around 330 AD. Having been driven from the Danube by the Romans, the Thervingi began infiltrating the Tisza Sarmatians. Vidigoia was probably the leader of this infiltration. Herwig Wolfram designates Vidigoia, along with Geberic, as one of the first reiks, who were military kings emerging among the Goths at this time.

The Gothic advance into Sarmatian territory led to a confrontation in 332 AD. Quoting Priscus, the Gothic historian Jordanes states that Vidigoia perished in this battle "by the guile of the Sarmatians". Though Vidigoia died, the battle was a success for the Thervingi. They were however later decisively defeated by Constantine II the same year. A treaty between the Thervingi and the Roman Empire was thereafter made by Ariaric and Constantine.

Vidigoia was buried at the place of his death. Jordanes refers to him as the "bravest of the Goths". Centuries later Vidigoia was among the heroes the Goths celebrated in their songs, along with Eterpamara, Hanala and Fritigern. In the 5th century AD, when the Roman diplomat Priscus was traveling to the court of the Hunnic ruler Attila, his delegation passed by the place where Vidigoia was slain in a surprise attack by the Sarmatians. Vidigoia is thought to be one of the inspirations for the Germanic hero Witege.

== Sources ==
- Christensen, Arne Søby (2002). Cassiodorus, Jordanes and the History of the Goths: Studies in a Migration Myth. Museum Tusculanum Press. ISBN 8772897104.
- Wolfram, Herwig (1990). History of the Goths. University of California Press. ISBN 0520069838.
