= Heime =

Hero in Germanic heroic legend

Heime (German), Háma (Old English: Hāma), or Heimir (Old Norse) was a Germanic figure in Germanic heroic legend who often appears together with his friend Witige. He is mentioned in the Anglo-Saxon poems Beowulf and Widsith. He later appears in German epics such as Alpharts Tod, and in the Old Norse Þiðreks saga, which is based on German sources.

== Origins ==
Since Wudga is based on a Gothic hero named Vidigoia, it is possible that Hama has a similar origin, and the Anglo-Saxon poem Widsith talks of Hama and Wudga as Gothic warriors fighting against the Huns in the Vistula forests, where the Goths had an early settlement. Later, during the evolution of the legends, the two heroes were connected with both the Gothic kings Ermanaric and Theodoric the Great, and they were increasingly presented as traitors; it is as traitors that they appear in the Þiðrekssaga.

== In Middle High German legend ==
In the Middle High German Dietrich cycle, he is the son of a Madelger or Adelger of Lamparten. In the German poems, Heime is bought over by Ermanaric and so abandons Theodoric. This is not mentioned in Þiðrekssaga, but on the other hand it relates that Heime and his comrade Widga (Wudga) fight for Ermanaric. This pairing of Widga and Heime is also mentioned in Widsith. In Alpharts Tod, Witege (Wudga) is rescued from Alphart (Hildebrand's kinsman) by Heime. By dishonourably fighting two against one, Heime and Wudga kill Alphart.

According to some German sources, Heime is buried near Innsbruck at a monastery called Wilten.

== In Þiðrekssaga ==
According to the Þiðrekssaga, Heime was originally named Studas and named so after his father. However, he was renamed Heime after the fierce dragon he defeated in the forest. Heime has an excellent weapon named Blutgang and a famous horse called Rispa. When Theodoric is only 12 years old and Heime is 17, Heime leaves his home to challenge Theodoric in a duel. In the fight, Heime's sword, Blutgang, is destroyed and Theodoric's helmet shattered. Heime loses the duel, and swears allegiance to Theodoric. Later, when Theodoric wins the sword Eckesachs, he gives his old sword Nagelring to Heime. Heime is among Theodoric's twelve men who help him fight against Isung.

The Þiðrekssaga has Heime spend his last years in a monastery where he calls himself Ludwig. When a giant named Aspilian threatens the monastery, Heime dons his armour again and kills the giant. He fails to return to his life as a monk because Theodoric calls him back and wants his services again. Heime then returns to the monastery in order to demand taxes from the monks, but when he does not receive anything, he kills every monk inside it and burns it down. Heime then has to fight a second giant, but loses and is killed. He is avenged by Theodoric.

== See also ==
- The Four Sons of Aymon
- Duke Aymon

== Bibliography ==
- Haymes, Edward R. and Susann T. Samples. Heroic Legends of the North: An Introduction to the Nibelung and Dietrich Cycles. New York: Garland. 1996, p 151.
