= Nibelung =

Norse/German clan name

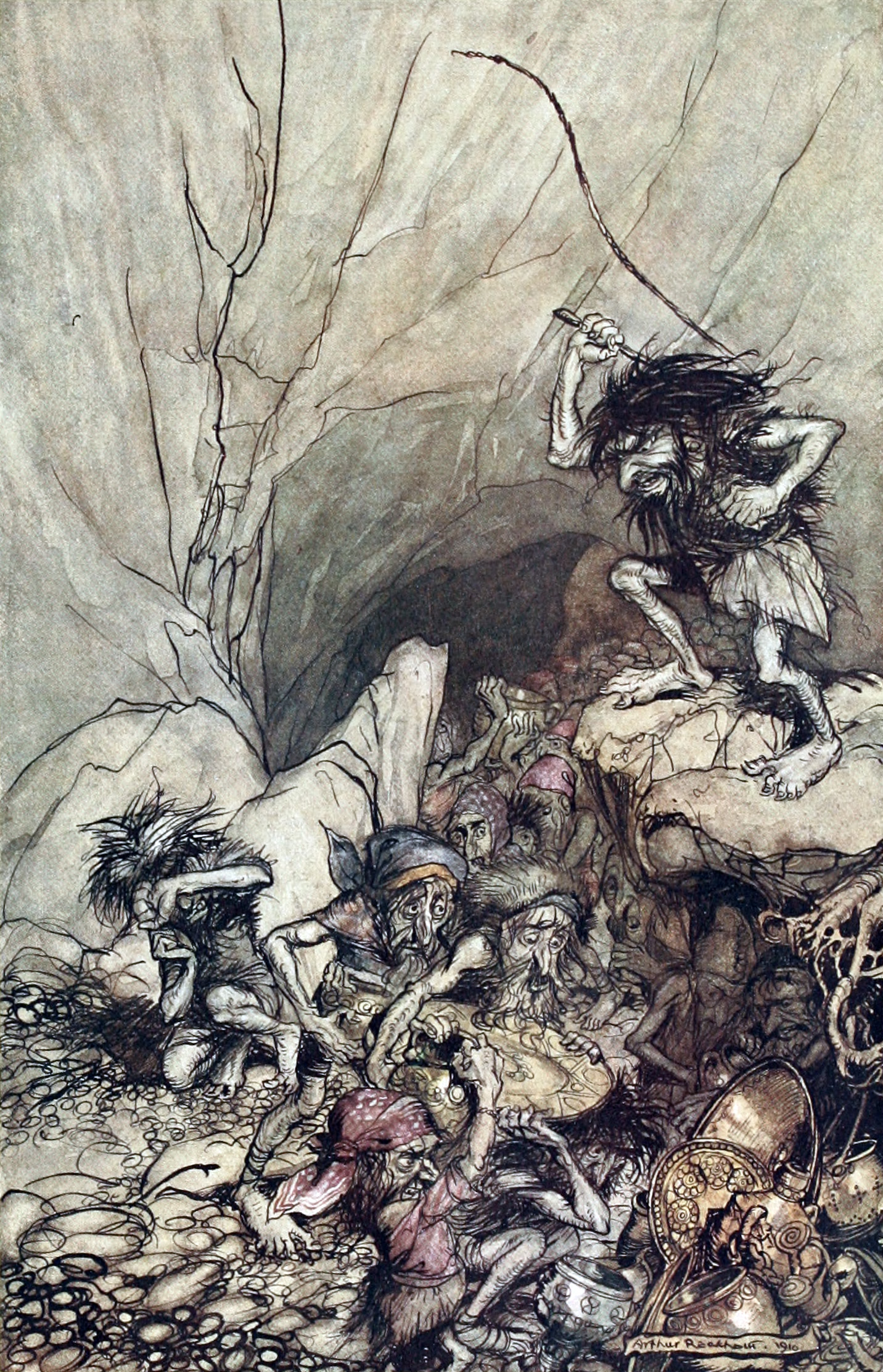
The dwarf Alberich (with whip) drives on the Nibelung dwarfs, who collect gold and other treasures. (Arthur Rackham, 1910)

The term Nibelung (German) or Niflungr (Old Norse) is a personal or clan name with several competing and contradictory uses in Germanic heroic legend. It has an unclear etymology, but is often connected to the root of German Nebel, meaning 'mist'. The term in its various meanings gives its name to the Middle High German heroic epic the Nibelungenlied.

The most widespread use of the term Nibelung denotes the Burgundian royal house, also known as the Gibichungen (German) or Gjúkingar (Old Norse). A group of royal brothers led by king Gunther or Gunnar, the Gibichungs are responsible for the death of the hero Siegfried or Sigurd and are later destroyed at the court of Attila the Hun (called Etzel in German and Atli in Old Norse). This is the only use of the term attested in the Old Norse legends.

In medieval German, several other uses of the term Nibelung are documented besides the reference to the Gibichungs: it refers to the king and inhabitants of a mythical land inhabited by dwarfs and giants in the first half of the Nibelungenlied, as well as to the father and one of two brothers fighting over a divided inheritance. This land and its inhabitants give their name to the "hoard of the Nibelungs" (Middle High German der Nibelunge hort). In the late medieval Lied vom Hürnen Seyfrid, the name, in the form Nybling or Nibling, is given to a dwarf who again gives his name to the treasure.

In Richard Wagner's opera cycle Der Ring des Nibelungen (1848–1874), Nibelung denotes a dwarf, or perhaps a specific race of dwarfs.

== In Waltharius ==
The earliest surviving probable mention of a form of the name 'Nibelung' occurs in the Latin poem Waltharius, believed to have been composed around the year 920. In lines 555–6 of that poem Walter, seeing Guntharius (Gunther) and his men approaching says (in the Chronicon Novaliciense text, usually taken to be the oldest):

Nōn assunt Avarēs hīc, sed Francī Nivilōnēs,
cultōrēs regiōnis.

The translation is: "These are not Avars, but Frankish Nivilons, inhabitants of the region." The other texts have nebulones 'worthless fellows' instead of nivilones, a reasonable replacement for an obscure proper name. (Medieval scribes often used b and v interchangeably in Latin texts, so Nivilones represents a reasonable Latinization of Germanic Nibilungos.) This is the only text to connect the Nibelungs with Franks. Since the Franks conquered the Burgundians in 534, Burgundians could loosely be considered Franks of a kind and confused with them. The name Nibelunc became a Frankish personal name in the 8th and 9th centuries, at least among the descendants of Childebrand I, Duke of Burgundy (who died c. 752).

In the poem, the center of Gunther's "Frankish" kingdom is the city of Worms on the Rhine. Worms functioned as the capital of the First Kingdom of Burgundy in the early fifth century CE; historical sources record Gunther (Gundahar) (died 437) as a Burgundian king in this period.

== Norse tradition ==
In the eddic poem (see Poetic Edda) Atlakviða, the word Niflungar is applied three times to the treasure (arfr) or hoard (hodd) of Gunnar (the Norse counterpart of German Gunther). It is also applied once to Gunnar's warriors and once to Gunnar himself. It elsewhere appears unambiguously as the name of the lineage to which the brothers Gunnar and Högni (Hǫgni) belong and seems mostly interchangeable with Gjúkingar or Gjúkungar, meaning descendants of Gjúki, Gjúki being Gunnar's father.

The variant form Hniflungr also occurs as the name of Högni's son in the eddic poem Atlamál, and as a term for the children borne by Gunnar's sister Gudrún (Guðrún) to Atli (Attila the Hun). It appears to be a general term for "warrior" in Helgakviða Hundingsbana I. Hniflungar might be of separate origin, meaning descendants of Hnef, referring to the Hnæf son of Hoc who is prominent in the Old English Finnesburg Fragment. However h was early dropped initially before other consonants in Norwegian dialects which might have led to the adding of h to names in other dialects where it did not originally belong.

== Niblung genealogy ==
=== Lex Burgundionum ===
In the Lex Burgundionum, issued by the Burgundian king Gundobad (c. 480–516), it is decreed that those who were free under the kings Gibica, Gundomar, Gislaharius, and Gundaharius will remain free. But as will be seen below, legendary tradition often makes Gibiche or Gjúki (that is Gibica) the father of Gunther/Gunnar and names Giselher (the same name as Gislaharius) as one of Gunther/Gunnar's brothers. In Norse tradition another brother is named Gutthorm (Gutþormr) which looks like a slight garbling of Gundomar. German tradition provides instead a third brother named Gernot, which may be a substitution of a more familiar name for an unfamiliar one. In the Nibelungenlied, all three brothers are called kings. If these legends preserve authentic tradition, then historically Gibica of the Burgundian Laws might have been the father of the three kings Gundomar, Gislaharius, and Gundaharius who shared the kingdom among them, presumably with Gundaharius as the high king (the sharing of the throne between brothers was a common tradition among the Germanic tribes, see Germanic king). But if so, the order of the names here is puzzling. One would expect Gundaharius to be named immediately after Gibica.

=== German tradition ===
In the Waltharius King Gibicho of the Franks is father of Guntharius, that is Gunther, and both father and son are called kings of the Franks, not kings of the Burgundians, though their city is Worms on the Rhine. Another king called Heriricus rules the Burgundians and is father of Hiltgunt, the heroine of the tale. The only other kinsman of Gunther who appears here is Hagano (Hagen). But Hagano's exact familial relation to Guntharius is not given.

The Old Norse Þiðrekssaga is a medieval translation of German legendary material into Norwegian. Here Gunther (given the Old Norse form Gunnar) and his brothers are sons and heirs of Irung (in one place) or Aldrian (elsewhere) by Aldrian's wife Ode. The sons are named Gunnar, Gernoz, and Gisler. Ode also bears a daughter named Grímhild. One later passage adds Guthorm. But Guthorm is never mentioned again and is possibly an addition from Norse tradition by the translator or by an early copyist. Hǫgni (German Hagen) appears as their maternal half-brother, fathered on Ode by an elf when Ode once fell asleep in the garden while her husband was drunk. Yet one passage names Hǫgni's father as Aldrian. There are confusions and doublings in the Þiðrekssaga and it may be that Aldrian was properly the name of Hǫgni's elf father. Gunnar and his legitimate brothers are often called Niflungar and their country is named Niflungaland. Their sister Grímhild bore to Atli (Attila) a son named Aldrian who is slain by Hǫgni. At the end of the resultant battle, Hǫgni, though mortally wounded, fathered a son on Herad, one of Þiðrek's relations. This son, named Aldrian, accomplished Atli's death and became Jarl of Niflungaland under Brynhild (Brynhildr). In the Faroese Hǫgnatáttur a similar tale is told. Here Gunnar and Hǫgni have two younger brothers named Gislar and Hjarnar, both slain along with their elder brothers. Hǫgni lies with a Jarl's daughter named Helvik on his deathbed and prophecies to Helvik that a son born to her will avenge him. The son in this account is named Högni. On the birth of the child, Helvik, following Hǫgni's advice, secretly exchanged it with a newborn child of "Gudrún" and "Artala". As a result, Gudrún slew the supposed child of Hǫgni, thinking to have put an end to Hǫgni's lineage, but in fact killed her own child and then brought up Hǫgni's child as her own. This second Hǫgni learned of his true parentage and took vengeance on Artala as in the Þiðrekssaga.

In the Nibelungenlied and its dependent poems the Klage and Biterolf, the father of Gunther, Gernot, Giselher, and Kriemhild is named Dankrat and their mother is named Uote. Hagen is their kinsman (exact relationship not given), and has a brother named Dancwart whose personality is bright and cheerful in contrast to Hagen's. Hagen also has a sister's son named Ortwin of Metz. These family relationships might seem to prohibit any elvish siring, but in the cognate story of Brân the Blessed in Branwen ferch Llŷr, Hagen's counterpart Efnisien had a brother named Nisien who was similarly his opposite and Efnisien and Nisien are maternal half-brothers to Brân and Manawyddan just as in the Þiðrekssaga, Hǫgni was maternal brother to Gunnar and Gernoz. In the second half of the Nibelungenlied both Hagen and Dankwart are called sons of Aldrian. Nothing further is told of Aldrian here. Also in the Nibelungenlied, Gunther and Brunhild had a son named Siegfried and Siegfried and Kriemhild had a son named Gunther. Kriemhild's later son born to Etzel (= Attila) who is slain by Hagen is here named Ortlieb. The Klage relates that Gunther's son Siegfried inherited the kingdom.

=== Norse tradition ===
The Skáldskaparmál names the founder of the Niflung lineage as Nefi, one of the second set of nine sons of Halfdan the Old who founded many famous legendary lineages. The Ættartolur (genealogies attached to the Hversu Noregr byggdist) call this son of Halfdan by the name Næfil (Næfill) and relate that King Næfil was father of Heimar, father of Eynef (Eynefr), father of Rakni, father of Gjúki.

The form Gjúki is etymologically equatable to Gebicca of the Lex Burgundionum. According to the Skáldskaparmál and the Ættartolur, Gjúki was father of two sons named Gunnar (Gunnarr) and Högni (Hǫgni) and of two daughters named Gudrún (Guðrún) and Gullrönd. Their mother was named Grímhild (Grímhildr). Gudný is mentioned in no other extant texts. A younger brother named Gutthorm (Gutþormr) take on the role of Sigurd's slayer, after being egged on by Gunnar and Högni in the eddic poems Brot af Sigurðarkviðu (stanza 4), in Sigurðarkviða hin skamma (stanzas 20–23), and in the Völsunga saga (as well as being mentioned in the eddic poems Grípisspá and Guðrúnarkviða II). According to the eddic poem Hyndluljóð, stanza 27:

Gunnarr ok Högni,
Gjúka arfar,
ok it sama Guðrún,
systir þeira;
eigi var Gutþormr
Gjúka ættar,
þó var hann bróðir
beggja þeira;
allt er þat ætt þín,
Óttarr heimski.

— Guðni Jónsson's edition of Eddukvæði Sæmundar-Eddu.
Translation:

Gunnar and Högni,
the heirs of Gjúki,
And Gudrún as well,
who their sister was;
But Gotthorm was not
of Gjúki's race,
Although the brother
of both he was:
And all are thy kinsmen,
Óttar, thou fool!

If Gotthorm or Gutthorm, the slayer of Sigurd in northern tradition, is brother of Gunnar and Högni, but is not a son of Gjúki, he must be a maternal half-brother, just as Hagen, the slayer of Siegfried in the German tradition, is a maternal half-brother in the Thidreks saga.

Gudrún bore to Sigurd a son named Sigmund according to the Völsunga saga, presumably the same as the unnamed son mentioned in stanza 5 of Sigurdarkvida hin skamma. But nothing more is said of him. More often mentioned is Gudrún's daughter named Svanhild (Svanhildr) who became the wife of Jörmunrek (Jǫrmunrekr). By her third husband Jónakr, Gudrún is mother of Hamdir (Hamðir) and Sörli (Sǫrli). In the eddic poems Guðrúnarhvöt and Hamðismál, Erp (Erpr), a third son of Jónakr, was born by a different mother. But in the Skáldskaparmál and the Völsunga saga Erp is also a son of Gudrún.

In the Atlakviða (stanza 12), a son of Högni says farewell to his father as Gunnar and Högni depart to visit Atli. The Atlamál (stanza 28) brings in two sons of Högni by his wife Kostbera, named Snævar (Snævarr) and Sólar (Sólarr). They accompany their father and uncle on their fateful journey to Atli's court where they also meet their deaths. These sons are also mentioned in the prose introduction to the eddic poem Dráp Niflunga along with a third son Gjúki. The Atlamál later introduces another son of Högni (or possibly Gjúki son of Högni under another name) who, along with Gudrún, kills Atli. In the Völsunga saga this son is named Niflung (Niflungr). He may be a reflex of the posthumous son of Högni who is called Aldrian in the Thidreks saga. The Danish Hven Chronicle also tells the story of Högni's posthumous son begotten as Högni is dying, of the switching of children so that Högni is brought up as son of Atli and "Gremhild", and of how this son lures Gremhild to the cave of treasure and seals her in.

== Other interpretations of Nibelung ==
=== A northern people ===
Although Nibelungs refers to the royal family of the Burgundians in the second half of the Nibelunglenlied (as well as in many other texts), in the first half Nibelungenlant it is instead a kingdom on the borders of Norway of which Siegfried becomes the ruler.

In Adventure 3 Hagen tells how Siegfried came by chance upon the two sons of the king of the Nibelungs who had just died. Their names were Schilbung and Nibelung and they were attempting to divide their father's hoard, the hoard of the Nibelungs. They asked Siegfried to make the division for them. For a reason not explained, Siegfried was unable to make the division, despite much effort. Fighting broke out and Siegfried slew Schilbung, Nibelung, twelve giants, and seven hundred warriors, at which point those still alive, not unreasonably, surrendered and took Siegfried as their king. In this way, Siegfried gained the Nibelung treasure, though he still had to fight the dwarf Alberich, whom he defeated and made guardian of the hoard. We are to presume that when the treasure passed to the Burgundian kings after Siegfried's death, the name Nibelung went with it.

It is a common folklore motif that the protagonist comes upon two or three persons or creatures quarreling about a division of treasure or magical objects among themselves, that they ask the protagonist to make the division for them, and that in the end it is the protagonist who ends up as owner of the treasure. Schilbung and Niblung are otherwise unknown. It may be coincidence that in the Ættartolur, Skelfir ancestor of the Skilfings and Næfil ancestor of the Niflungs (Nibelungs) are brothers, though there they are two of nine brothers.

=== Referring to dwarfs ===
In a later poem Das Lied vom Hürnen Seyfrid ('The Song of Horny-skinned Siegfried'), known only from 16th century printed versions, the original owner of the hoard is a dwarf named Nibeling (or Nyblung). Siegfried happened to find it one day and bore it away. At Worms Siegfried met King Gybich, his three sons Gunther, Hagen, and Gyrnot, and his daughter Kriemhild. When Kriemhild was abducted by a dragon, Siegfried rescued her and was given her hand in marriage.

This variant usage of Niblung may arise from the identification of the hoard of the Burgundians, or at least most of it, with the hoard of treasure won by Siegfried. The German versions of the tale make much of Kriemhild's right to the "Nibelungen" treasure through her previous marriage to Siegfried. Some seemingly took Nibelung to apply primarily to Siegfried's treasure, in which case it must mean something else than the Burgundian royal family, and so another explanation was contrived.

The alternate theory is that the connection with the treasure was indeed primary, and that nibel-, nifl-, meaning 'mist, cloud', referred originally to a dwarfish origin for the hoard, though this was later forgotten and the application of the name to the Burgundian royal family arose from misunderstanding. In the first half of the Nibelungenlied, Siegfried's last fight to win the treasure is against the dwarf Alberich. In Das Lied vom Hürnen Seyfried the treasure belonged to the dwarf Nybling. Though the kings of the Nibelungs named Schilbung and Nibelung in the first half of the Nibelungenlied are humans as far as is told, it would not be impossible that in earlier tradition they were explicitly dwarfs like Alberich. The people of the Nibelungs also have giants in their service, perhaps an indication of their earlier supernatural stature. In the Norse tales the hoard originates from a dwarf named Andvari, thence passes to Odin, and then to Hreidmar (Hreiðmarr), and then to Hreidmar's son Fáfnir who changes into dragon form, and from him to Sigurd (Siegfried).

Niflheim ("Mist-home") is a mythical region of cold and mist and darkness in the north. Niflhel is a term for part or all of Hel, the land of the dead. As dwarfs are subterranean creatures in these tales, who live in darkness, Niflung would seem a reasonable name for these beings, an old name forgotten in the north and only preserved in the garblings of some German accounts of the origin of the Niblung hoard. In "Silver Fir Cones", one of the tales found in Otmar's Volkssagen (Traditions of the Harz) (Bremen, 1800), the king of the dwarfs is named Gübich.

It cannot be proved which meaning was primary, that of dwarf or Burgundian prince. Scholars today mostly believe that the Burgundian connection is the more original one. In the 19th century, the dwarf theory was popular and was adopted by Richard Wagner for his operatic Ring cycle which was very freely adapted from the tales surrounding Siegfried and the Burgundians. In Wagner's operas Nibelungs refers to the race of dwarfs.

== Theories of etymology and origins ==
Several different etymologies of the term Nibelung have been proposed; they are usually connected to a specific theory of the original nature of the name: referring originally to mythical beings, to the Franks, or to the Burgundians.

=== Referring to mythical beings ===
Andreas Heusler and many other scholars have derived the name Nibelung from the root *nebula-, meaning cloud, mist, or fog, or *nibila-, meaning low, deep, or dark (cf. Niflheim). This derivation frequently assumes that the name originally referred to mythological beings and means something to the effect of "beings of mist". Heusler reasoned that the name became attached to the various possessors of the Nibelungs' treasure and thereby passed from the mythical beings, to Siegfried, and then to the Burgundians in the Nibelungenlied.

Stefan Schaffner proposes another theory: again assuming that Nibelung originally referred to mythical beings, instead derives the name from a root *nibla- or *nibula- meaning "being below", which Schaffner connects to Niflheim.

Whatever the actual derivation of the name Nibelung, it is clear that it was interpreted as being connected to the word nebel (mist, fog), and that the form of the word was likely altered via this association. A clear example can be seen in the name of the dwarf Nybling from Das Lied vom Hürnen Seyfrid, which was translated into Czech as Mlháček, from Czech mlha (mist). In the Nibelungenlied, the name of Nibelung's brother, Schilbung, has similarly been suggested to have a meaning "rock- or cave-man" or "frost-man", meaning that Nibelung's name may similarly have been interpreted as "mist-man".

=== Referring to the Nibelungid branch of the Frankish Pippinid dynasty ===
George Gillespie presents the theory that the name Nibelung originally applied to the Nibelungid cadet branch of the Pippinid dynasty of Frankish mayors of the palace, the later Carolingian emperors. The name is first recorded in 752 in Latin as Nibelungus or Nivelongus, referring to a nephew of Charles Martel. The name is also recorded as belonging to several other members of a cadet branch of the dynasty descending from Charles's brother Childebrand I; this cadet branch is known as the Nibelungids or Nibelungs. A reference to nebulones Franci (translated as "Nibelungian Franks") in the Waltharius is used as further evidence, though this translation of the epithet nebulones is disputed.

Gillespie and C. W. von Sydow argue the name may derive from Nivelles in Walloon Brabant, where the Pippinids founded a monastery and maintained strong connections. The name Nivelles either derives from the Germanic *Niuwa-alha, meaning new sanctuary, or from a Celtic toponym.

According to this theory, the name Nibelung came to be attached to the Burgundian royal house after the Kingdom of Burgundy in southern France was absorbed into the Frankish kingdom in 613 and came under the rule of the Frankish Nibelungids. Rejecting a Burgundian origin for the name, Gillespie further notes that Gunther is recorded in Old English as Gūðhere, but is referred to as a Burgundian rather than a Nibelung, a name which is unattested in Old English.

=== Referring to a Burgundian clan ===
Ursula Dronke and Helmmut Rosenfeld argue that the name Nibelung originally referred to a Burgundian clan. They note the existence of several place names in Savoy, the location of the French kingdom of Burgundy, which can be derived from a reconstructed Nibilungos, including Neblens, Noblens, and Neublans.

Dronke argues that after the resettlement of the Burgundians from the Rhine to the Kingdom of Burgundy in 411, the clan name Nibelung was transferred to the Burgundian royal dynasty of the Gibichings (Old Norse Gjúkingar). It was then afterwards adopted by the Franks, who came to identify the Gibichungs as Franks as well, as in the Waltharius. Rosenfeld, on the other hand, argues that the Burgundian clan name Nibelung was adopted by the Nibelungid cadet branch of the Frankish Pippinid dynasty once Charles Martell's brother Childebrand I and his descendants came to rule the former Burgundian kingdom as counts. The royal name Gibichung was then replaced in the heroic tradition with Nibelung in order to connect this Frankish cadet branch to the Burgundian royal dynasty.

Dronke subscribes to the traditional scholarly derivation of the name Nibelung from nibel or nebel, meaning cloud or darkness. She notes that other Burgundian clan names are recorded with similar associations: Wulkingos, from wolkan, cloud; Dagilingos, deriving from day; Leuhtingos, deriving from light; and Sauilingos, deriving from sol, meaning sun.

Rosenfeld derives the name instead from a name *Niwilo, which is a nickname for the name *Niuw-man (literally "new-man"). Nibelung would be the patronymic of this name, with the change from w to b showing Romance influence.

== Adaptations ==
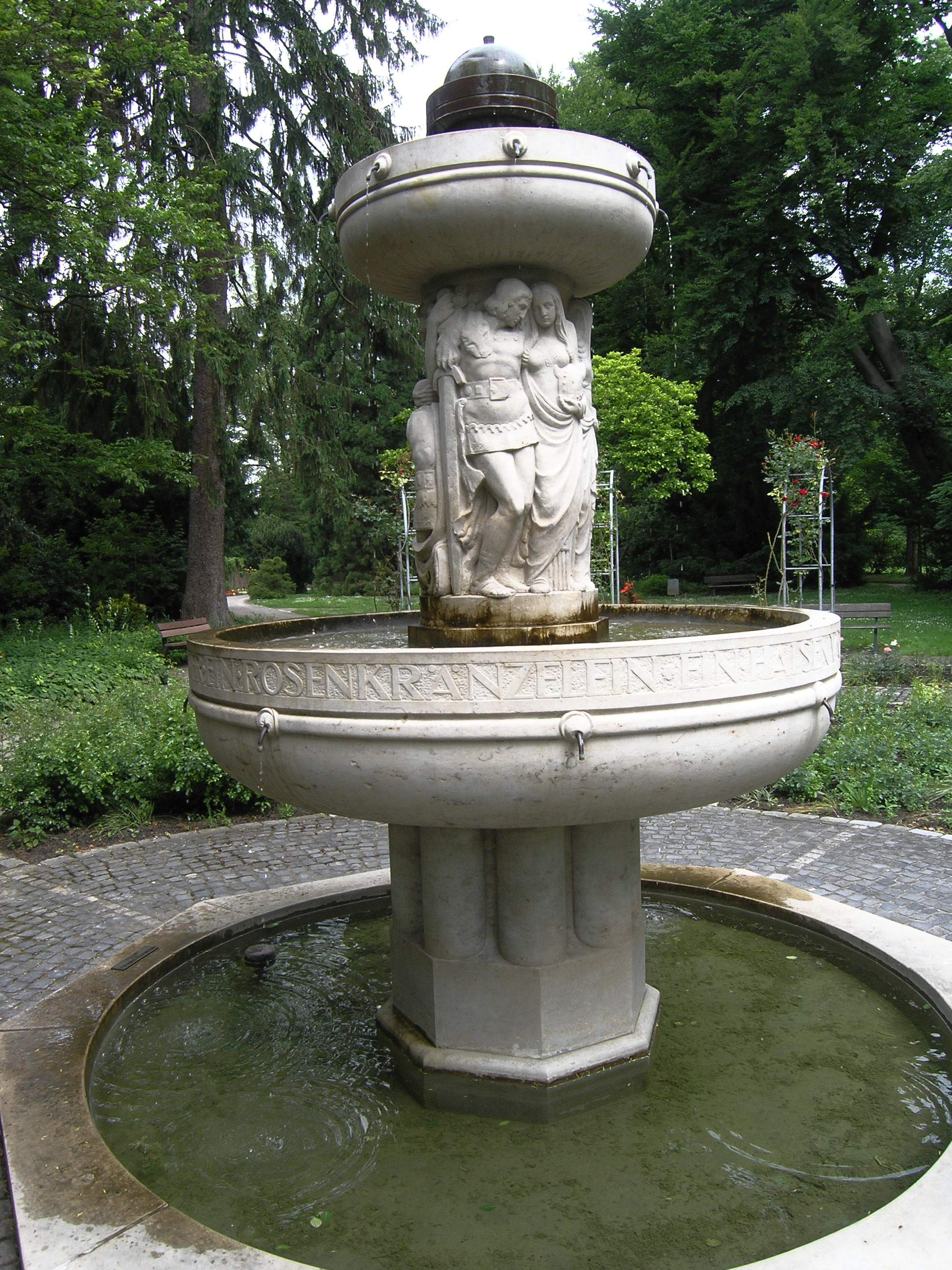
Nibelungs fountain in Durlach, 1915 by Otto Feist

- Richard Wagner's opera cycle Der Ring des Nibelungen was composed over the course of about twenty-six years, from 1848 to 1874.
- Die Nibelungen is a two-part fantasy film created by Fritz Lang in 1924.
- Die Nibelungen is a film remake in two parts, 1966/67 by Harald Reinl/Harald G. Petersson.
- Ring of the Nibelungs is a 2004 TV film directed by Uli Edel.
- The Ring of Nibelung is a comic book series by P. Craig Russell, beginning in 2000, which follows the progression of Wagners 4-part opera cycle.
- The Legend of Sigurd and Gudrun is a narrative poem by J. R. R. Tolkien which adapts the Niflung legends into alliterative verse. Originally written when the author was an Oxford professor during the 1930s, the poem was posthumously published in May 2009.
- Die Jagd nach dem Schatz der Nibelungen or 'The Charlemagne Code', a 2008 TV film on search for the treasure of the Nibelungen.

== See also ==
- Nibelungentreue
