= Hamðismál =

Poem in the Poetic Edda

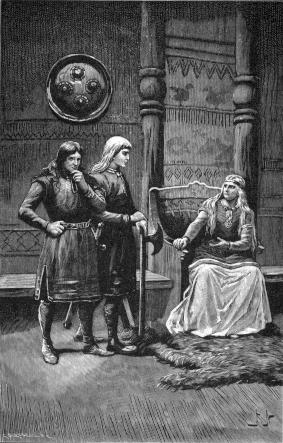
Gudrun agitating her sons for vengeance.

The Hamðismál is a poem which ends the heroic poetry of the Poetic Edda, and thereby the whole collection.

Gudrun had been the wife of the hero Sigurd, whom her brothers had killed. With Sigurd she had had the daughter Svanhild, who had married to the Goth king Ermanaric (Jörmunrekkr). Ermanaric had Svanhild trampled to death by horses, due to which Gudrun wants vengeance, and she agitates her sons (see Jonakr's sons) from a later marriage to kill Ermanaric, cf. Guðrúnarhvöt.

The poem is considered to belong to the oldest of the heroic poems, probably from the 9th century. It makes an archaic impression with its bitter and laconic language. Howling with wrath, the brothers Hamdir and Sörli ride over a misty mountain. The last lines are like carved on a runestone:

Þar fell Sa/rli
at salar gafli,
enn Hamþir hne
at hvsbaki.

— Bugge's edition
Translation:

At the hall's gable-end
Fell Sorli to earth,
But Hamdir lay low
At the back of the houses.

— Morris and Magnusson's translation

== Sources and historic basis ==
The legend of Jörmunrek appears in the Poetic Edda as Hamðismál and Guðrúnarhvöt. It also appears in Bragi Boddason's Ragnarsdrápa, in the Völsunga saga and in Gesta Danorum.

Jordanes wrote in 551 that the Gothic king Ermanaric was upset with the attack of a subordinate king and had his wife Sunilda (i.e. Svanhild) torn to pieces by horses, and as revenge Ermanaric was pierced with spears by her brothers Ammius (Hamdir) and Sarus (Sörli) and died from the wounds. The Annals of Quedlinburg (end of the 10th century) relates that the brothers Hemidus (Hamdir), Serila (Sörli) and Adaccar (Erp/Odoacer) had cut off the hands of Ermanarik.
