= Guðrúnarhvöt =

Eddic poem

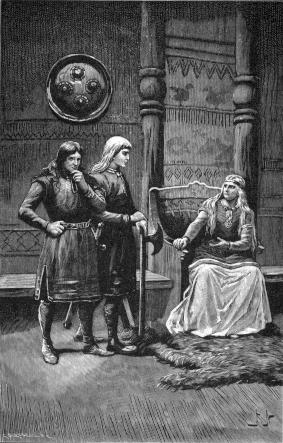
Gudrun agitating her sons

Guðrúnarhvöt is one of the heroic poems of the Poetic Edda. Gudrun had been married to the hero Sigurd and with him she had the daughter Svanhild. Svanhild had married the Gothic king Ermanaric (Jörmunrekkr), but betrayed him with the king's son, Randver. Furious, Ermanaric hanged his own son and had Svanhild trampled to death by horses.

Gudrun wants to avenge her daughter and she agitates her sons Hamdir and Sörli, her sons with King Jonakr by telling them about her fate. They depart for their fateful vengeance, a story that is told in the Hamðismál, the last poem of the Poetic Edda.

== Sources and historic basis ==
The legend of Jörmunrek appears in the Poetic Edda as Hamðismál and Guðrúnarhvöt. It also appears in Bragi Boddason's Ragnarsdrápa, in the Völsunga saga and in Gesta Danorum.

Jordanes wrote in 551 that the Gothic king Ermanaric was upset with the attack of a subordinate king and had his wife Sunilda (i.e. Svanhild) torn to pieces by horses, and as revenge Ermanaric was pierced with spears by her brothers Ammius (Hamdir) and Sarus (Sörli) and died from the wounds. The Annals of Quedlinburg (end of the 10th century) relates that the brothers Hemidus (Hamdir), Serila (Sörli) and Adaccar (Erp/Odoacer) had cut off the hands of Ermanarik.
