= Jonakr's sons =

Three brothers in Germanic heroic legend

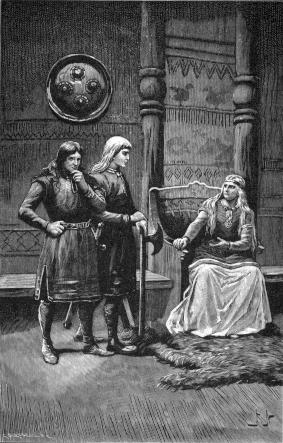
Guðrún agitating her sons.

Hamdir (Old Norse: [ˈhɑmdez̠]), Sörli (O.N.: Sǫrli [ˈsɔrle]), and Erpr (O.N.: [ˈerpz̠]) were three brothers in Germanic heroic legend who may have had a historic basis in the history of the Goths.

== Names ==
In Jordanes' Getica, our earliest source, the names of the characters are given in Latin as: Ammius (Hamdir), Sarus (Sörli), Sunilda (Svanhildr) and Hermanaricus (Jörmunrekkr), they can respectively be reconstructed as Gothic:

*Hamaþius (𐌷𐌰𐌼𐌰𐌸𐌹𐌿𐍃) from *hama (covering) and þius (slave, servant). *Sarwa (𐍃𐌰𐍂𐍅𐌰) or alternatively *Sarwila from sarwa (war-gear, armour) and -ila (a diminutive suffix). *Swanahilds (𐍃𐍅𐌰𐌽𐌰𐌷𐌹𐌻𐌳𐍃) from *swans (swan) and *hilds (battle). *Airmanareiks (𐌰𐌹𐌺𐌼𐌰𐌽𐌰𐌺𐌴𐌹𐍂𐍃) from *ermans (great, world) and reiks (king).

== Legend ==
According to the Edda and Völsunga saga, Hamdir and Sörli were the sons of Gjuki's daughter Guðrún and King Jonakr (O.N.: Jónakr [ˈjoːnɑkz̠]). Erpr was the son of Jonakr from an earlier marriage. Svanhildr, the daughter of Sigurðr and Guðrún, was also raised by Jonakr.

King Jörmunrekr (Ermanaric) proposed to Svanhildr through his son Randver, but the treacherous Bicke said that Randver tried to win Svanhild's love. Consequently, Jörmunrekr sentenced Randver to death by hanging and had Svanhildr trampled to death by horses. Guðrún then agitated her sons Hamdir and Sörli to avenge their half-sister, and told them not to hurt the stones on the road. When Sörli and Hamdir met Erpr en route, they did not understand his riddles and, thinking him arrogant, killed him.

During the night, they arrived and they cut off Jörmunrek's hands and feet. This made Jörmunrekr wake up and he cried for his housecarls. Hamdir said that if Erpr had been alive he would have cut off the head, and remark that they shouldn't have damaged the stones of the road. The housecarls could not kill the two brothers with sharp weapons, but an old one-eyed man (Odin) advised them to kill them with stones. They are the last known generation of the Volsung lineage.

This is why skaldic poetry used the "sorrow of Jonakr's sons" as a kenning for stones.

In Ynglingatal (9th century), Þjóðólfr of Hvinir mentions their death in a kenning on the death of the Swedish king Anund:

Varð Ǫnundr Jónakrs bura harmi heptr und Himinfjǫllum. Ok ofvæg Eistra dolgi heipt hrísungs at hendi kom. Ok sá frǫmuðr foldar beinum Hǫgna *reyrs of horfinn vas.	Ǫnundr was killed by the pain of the sons of Jónakr [STONES] beneath Himinfjǫll. And the crushing hatred of the bastard [STONES] came upon the enemy of the Estonians [= Ǫnundr]. And that wielder of the reed of Hǫgni <legendary hero> [SWORD > WARRIOR] was surrounded by the bones of the earth [STONES].

== Sources and historic basis ==
The legend of Jörmunrek appears in the Poetic Edda as Hamðismál and Guðrúnarhvöt. It also appears in Bragi Boddason's Ragnarsdrápa, in the Völsunga saga, and in Gesta Danorum. Jordanes wrote in 551 that the Gothic king Ermanaric was upset with the attack of a subordinate king and had his wife Sunilda (i.e. Svanhildr) torn to pieces by horses and as revenge Ermanaric was pierced with spears by her brothers Ammius (Hamdir) and Sarus (Sörli) and died from the wounds. The Annals of Quedlinburg (end of the 10th century) relates that the brothers Hemidus (Hamdir), Serila (Sörli), and Adaccar (Erpr/Odoacer) had cut off the hands of Ermanaric.

== In popular culture ==
The legend forms the background behind Poul Anderson's short story "The Sorrow of Odin the Goth".

== See also ==
- Lech, Czech and Rus
- Kyi, Shchek and Khoryv
- Ermenrichs Tod

== Secondary source ==
- An article on Hamder in Nordisk familjebok
