= Svanhildr =

Figure in Germanic legend

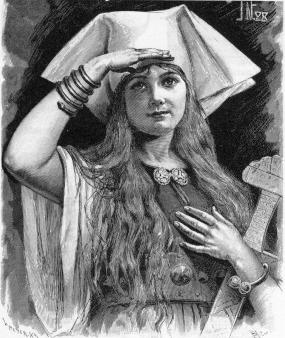
Svanhildr as illustrated by Jenny Nyström in Fredrik Sander's 1893 Swedish edition of the Poetic Edda.

Svanhildr was the daughter of Sigurd and Gudrun in Germanic heroic legend who was noted for her beauty. Her death at the hands of her husband Ermanaric was told in many northern European stories, including the Old Norse Poetic Edda (Hamðismál and Guðrúnarhvöt), Prose Edda, and Völsunga Saga; the skaldic poem Ragnarsdrápa; the Danish Latin Gesta Danorum; and the German Latin Annals of Quedlinburg.

She was "the most beautiful of all women", and was married to Ermanaric (Jörmunrekkr) the king of the Goths. She was accused of infidelity with the king's son, Randver. Because of this Ermanaric had her trampled to death under horses.

Her mother made her half-brothers Hamdir and Sörli exact revenge for her death, a story which is retold in Hamðismál and Guðrúnarhvöt, Bragi Boddason's Ragnarsdrápa, in the Völsunga saga and in Gesta Danorum.

Jordanes wrote in 551 AD that Ermanaric, king of the Gothic Greuthungi, was upset with the attack of a subordinate king and had his young wife Sunilda (i.e. Svanhild) torn apart by four horses. As revenge Ermanaric was pierced with spears by her brothers Ammius (Hamdir) and Sarus (Sörli) and died from the wounds. The Annals of Quedlinburg (end of the 10th century) relates that the brothers Hemidus (Hamdir), Serila (Sörli) and Adaccar (Erp/Odoacer) had cut off the hands of Ermanaric.

== See also ==
- Jonakr's sons
- Ermenrichs Tod

== Other sources ==
- Anderson, Rasmus B. (1876) Norse Mythology: Myths of the Eddas (Chicago: S. C. Griggs and company; London: Trubner & co. Reprinted 2003, Honolulu: University Press of the Pacific) ISBN 1-4102-0528-2
