= Herv =

Herv may refer to:

== People ==
- Herv., the abbreviation for botanist author Alpheus Baker Hervey (1839–1931)
- Hervǫr (Herv), a skald (Scandinavian poet)
- Hervǫr Hundingjadóttir (HervH), a skald (Scandinavian poet)

== Other uses ==
- Human endogenous retrovirus
