= Þjóðólfr of Hvinir =

Norwegian poet (skald)

Þórbjǫrn Hornklofi
- Occupation: Skald
- Writing career
- Language: Old Norse
- Years active: Late 9th to early 10th century
- Period: Viking Age
- Notable works: Haustlǫng, Ynglingatal
- Movement: Skaldic poetry

Þjóðolfr ór Hvini (Old Norse pronunciation: [ˈθjoːðˌolvz̠ oːz̠ ˈxwine]; anglicized as Thjódólf of Hvinir or Thiodolf; fl. late 9th–early 10th c. AD), was a Norwegian skald, said to have been one of the court-poets of the Norwegian king Harald Fairhair. His name suggests that he was from the region of Hvinir (Kvinesdal). Two skaldic poems, Haustlǫng (Autumn-long) and Ynglingatal (Enumeration of the Ynglingar), are generally attributed to him.

== Saga account ==
According to Heimskringla, he fostered Harald's sons Sigurd Hrisi, Halfdan Long-Leg, Gudröd the Radiant, Ragnvald Rettilbein.

== Works ==
Both Haustlǫng and Ynglingatal are ascribed to Þjóðolfr of Hvinir from a relatively early period. They were preserved, along with some of his other verses, by the 13th-century Icelandic writer Snorri Sturluson in the Prose Edda. A third poem, Hrafnsmál, is also attributed to him by Snorri, although scholars rather think that it was composed by another of Harald Fairhair's court-poets named Þórbjǫrn Hornklofi.

Þjóðolfr composed Ynglingatal for Ragnvald Heidumhære, a chieftain from Vestfold (Oslofjord). The poem tells about the lives of the Ynglingar, a dynasty of kings from Uppsala, and forms the basis for Snorri's Ynglinga saga.

What we have preserved of Haustlǫng is centred on two mythological scenes: Loki's betraying of Iðunn, the Æsir's "old-age cure", which was snatched from them by the jǫtunn Þjazi in eagle form; and Thor's victorious combat against the strongest of the jǫtnar, Hrungnir. If Haustlǫng was composed in emulation of Bragi inn gamli's Ragnarsdrápa, as seems likely, then it will have had two further episodes.
