= Blood eagle =

Method of execution in Norse literature

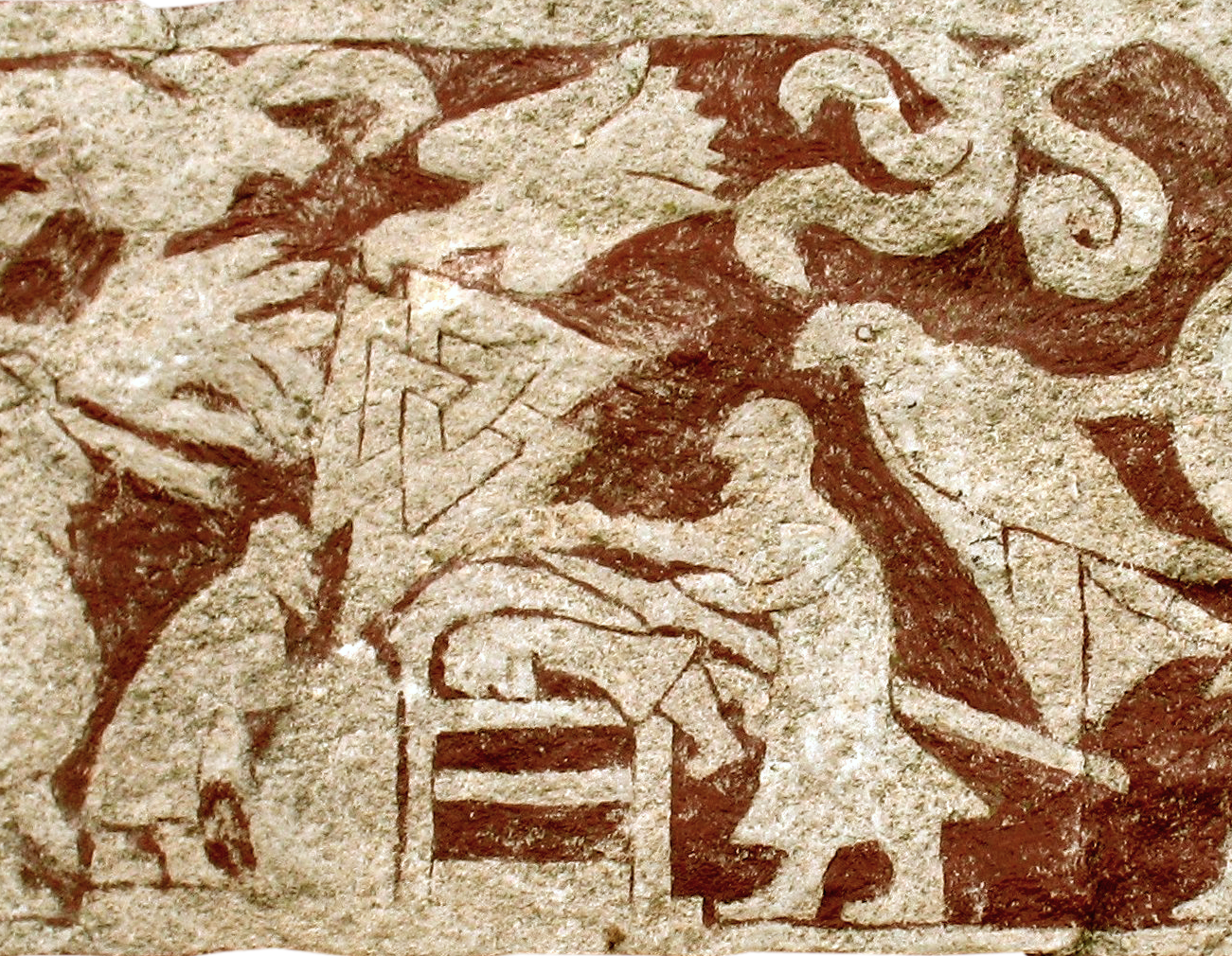
Detail from Stora Hammars I, Sweden shows a figure lying on his belly with another man using a weapon on his back. Note the triangular valknut symbol above, which is theorized to represent an ecstatic state.

The blood eagle was a method of ritual execution as detailed in late skaldic poetry. According to the two instances mentioned in the Christian sagas, the victims (in both cases members of royal families) were placed in a prone position, their ribs severed from the spine with a sharp tool, and their lungs pulled through the opening to create a pair of "wings". There has been continuing debate about whether the rite was a literary invention of the original texts, a mistranslation of the texts themselves, or an authentic historical practice.

== Accounts ==
The blood-eagle ritual-killing rite appears in just two instances in Norse literature, plus oblique references some have interpreted as referring to the same practice. The primary versions share certain commonalities: the victims are both noblemen (Halfdan Haaleg or "Long-leg" was a prince; Ælla of Northumbria a king), and both of the executions were in retaliation for the murder of a father.

=== Regin and Lyngvi ===
There is an oblique reference to the "bloody eagle" ritual being conducted on Lyngvi Hundingsson or his brother, who were in the process of being avenged by Sigurðr the Völsung, for they (the sons of Hunding) were responsible for the death of his father, Sigmundr. (Note: The revenge is described in Völsunga saga Ch. 17, but the mention of the blood eagle is wanting.) In the Eddic poem, Sigurðr's magical swordsmith mentor Regin says: (Note: Variant edition: Nú er blóðugr örn breiðum hjörvi bana Sigmundar á baki ristinn. Fár var fremri, sá er fold rýðr, hilmis nefi, ok hugin gladdi.) (Note: Variant web-published translation: Now is the bloody eagle with a broad sword carved on the back of the killer of Sigmund. Few were better kinsmen of kings, who rule land and gladden the raven.)

Nú er blóðugr ǫrn breiðum hjǫrvi
bana Sigmundar á baki ristinn.
Fár var fremri, sá er fold ryði
hilmis hnefi ok Hugin gladdi! (Note: Regisnmál 26, as quoted in Nornagests þáttr.)

—Reginsmál 26

Now the bloody eagle with biting sword
Is carved on the back of Sigmund's killer;
Few were more fierce in fight than his son,
Who reddened the earth and gladdened the ravens. (Note: The word translated "raven" is not hrafn but hugin, the personal name of one of Odin's ravens.)

—Bellows, Henry Adams, tr. (1923) (Note: The poem is also quoted in the þáttr; cf. alternative translation of this stanza by Kershaw.)

Further details are only elaborated on by Nornagests þáttr (early 14th century) which alleges that the wandering Jew-like Nornagestr was present at the scene as a servant of Sigurðr, and handed Regin his sword in order to perform the blood eagle upon Lyngvi, severing the ribs from the spine and ripping out the lungs. (Note: Old Norse: "Reginn lagði þat til ráðs, at rísta skyldi blóðörn á baki honum. Tók Reginn þá við sverði sínu af mér ok reist með því bak Lyngva, svá at hann skar rifin frá hryggnum ok dró þar út lungun") (Note: Regin sword Riðill (used to carve out Fáfnir's heart) is mentioned at the beginning of this chapter, though not explicitly stated as the one also used to rip out Lyngvi's lung.)

=== Einarr and Halfdan ===
There are two sources that purport to describe Torf-Einarr's ritual execution of Harald Fairhair's son, Halfdan Long-Leg, in the late 9th century. Both were written several centuries after the events they depict, and exist in various versions known to have influenced each other.

In the Orkneyinga saga, the blood eagle is described as a sacrifice to Odin.

Þar fundu þeir Hálfdan hálegg, ok lèt Einarr rísta örn á baki honum með sverði, ok skera rifin öll frá hrygginum ok draga þar út lúngun, ok gaf hann Óðni til sigrs sèr.

There they found Hálfdan Hálegg, and Einarr had an eagle carved on his back with a sword, and cut all the ribs from the spine and pulled out a lung, and he gave it to Odin for his victory.

Snorri Sturluson's Heimskringla contains an account of the same event described in Orkneyinga saga, with Einarr actually performing the deed himself:

Þá gékk Einarr jarl til Hálfdanar; hann reist örn á baki honum með þeima hætti, at hann lagði sverði á hol við hrygginn ok reist rifin öll ofan alt á lendar, dró þar út lungun; var þat bani Hálfdanar.

Afterwards, Earl Einarr went up to Halfdan and cut the "blood eagle" on his back, in this fashion that he thrust his sword into his chest by the backbone and severed all the ribs down to the loins, and then pulled out the lungs; and that was Halfdan's death.

=== Ragnar Lodbrok's sons and King Ælla of Northumbria ===
In Þáttr af Ragnars sonum (the "Tale of Ragnar's sons"), Ivar the Boneless has captured king Ælla of Northumbria, who had killed Ivar's father Ragnar Loðbrók. The killing of Ælla, after a battle for control of York, is described thus:

Ívarr ok þeir bræðr minntust nú, hversu faðir þeira var píndr. Létu þeir nú rista örn á baki Ellu ok skera síðan rifin öll frá hrygginum með sverði, svá at þar váru lungun út dregin. Svá segir Sighvatr skáld í Knútsdrápu:

Ivar and the brothers now recall how their father was tortured. They now had the eagle cut in Ella's back, then all his ribs severed from the backbone with a sword, in such a way that his lungs were pulled out there.

According to the saga version, Ivar appointed a skilled wood-carver for the task of carving the blood eagle.

The blood eagle is referred to by the 11th-century poet Sigvatr Þórðarson (also quoted in the Þáttr), who, some time between 1020 and 1038, wrote a skaldic verse named Knútsdrápa that recounts and establishes Ivar the Boneless as having killed Ælla and subsequently cutting his back.

Sighvatr's skaldic verse:

Original

Ok Ellu bak,
at, lét, hinns sat,
Ívarr ara,
Jórvík, skorit.

Literal translation

And Ella's back,
at, had, the one who dwelt,
Ívarr, with eagle,
York, cut.

Suggested reordering

And Ívarr, the one
who dwelt at York,
had Ella's back
cut with [an] eagle.

Skaldic verse, a common medium of Norse poets, was meant to be cryptic and allusive, and the idiomatic nature of Sighvatr's poem as a description of what has become known as the blood eagle is a matter of historical contention, particularly since in Norse imagery the eagle was strongly associated with blood and death.

Saxo Grammaticus in Gesta Danorum tells the following about Bjørn and Sigvard, sons of Ragnar Lodbrok and king Ælla:

Idque statuto tempore exsecuti, comprehensi ipsius dorsum plaga aquilam figurante affici iubent, saevissimum hostem atrocissimi alitis signo profligare gaudentes. Nec vulnus impressisse contenti, laceratam salivere carnem.

... This they did at the appointed time; and when they had captured him, they ordered the figure of an eagle to be cut in his back, rejoicing to crush their most ruthless foe by marking him with the cruellest of birds. Not satisfied with impressing a wound on him, they salted the mangled flesh.

== Authenticity ==
There is debate about whether the blood eagle was historically practiced, or whether it was a literary device invented centuries later by the Christian Norse authors who transcribed the sagas. No contemporary accounts of the rite exist, and the scant references in the sagas are several hundred years after the Christianization of Scandinavia.

In the 1970s, Alfred Smyth supported the historicity of the rite, stating that it is clearly human sacrifice to the Norse god Odin. He characterized St. Dunstan's description of Ælla's killing as an "accurate account of a body subjected to the ritual of the blood eagle".

Roberta Frank reviewed the historical evidence for the rite in her "Viking Atrocity and Skaldic Verse: The Rite of the Blood-Eagle", where she writes: "By the beginning of the nineteenth century, the various saga motifs—eagle sketch, rib division, lung surgery, and 'saline stimulant'—were combined in inventive sequences designed for maximum horror." She concludes that the authors of the sagas misunderstood alliterative kennings that alluded to leaving one's foes face down on the battlefield, their backs torn as carrion by scavenging birds. She compared the lurid details of the blood eagle to Christian martyrdom tracts, such as that relating the tortures of Saint Sebastian, shot so full of arrows that his ribs and internal organs were exposed. She suggests that these tales of martyrdom inspired further exaggeration of the misunderstood skaldic verses into a grandiose torture and death rite with no actual historic basis. David Horspool in his book King Alfred: Burnt Cakes and Other Legends, while not committing to the historical veracity of the rite, also saw parallels to martyrdom tracts. Frank's paper sparked a "lively debate".

Ronald Hutton's The Pagan Religions of the Ancient British Isles: Their Nature and Legacy states that "the hitherto notorious rite of the 'Blood Eagle,' the killing of a defeated warrior by pulling up his ribs and lungs through his back, has been shown to be almost certainly a Christian myth resulting from the misunderstanding of some older verse."

While taking no view on the historical authenticity of the ritual, the authors of a 2022 study led by Dr. Monte A. Gates concluded that the ritual as described was not inconsistent either with physiology or the tools available within the sociocultural context of the Viking era. They further concluded that, were it performed in the most extreme versions depicted in the sagas and the subject of the torture still lived at that point, death would have followed the severing of the ribs from the spine within seconds, due either to exsanguination or asphyxiation.

== See also ==
- Outline of capital punishment

== Sources ==
- Orkneyinga Saga: The History of the Earls of Orkney. Translated by Pálsson, Hermann; Edwards, Paul Geoffrey. Penguin Classics. 1981. ISBN 978-0-14-044383-7.
