= List of skalds =

List of Scandinavian skalds.

== List ==
=== A ===
- Aðils konungr (Aðils)
- Alrekr konungr (Alrekr)
- Angantýr Arngrímsson (Angantýr)
- Angantýr Heiðreksson (AngH)
- Arnfinnr's daughter (jarls)
- Arngrímr ábóti Brandsson (Arngr)
- Arnórr jarlaskáld Þórðarson (Arn)
- Atli litli (Atli)
- Auðr (Auðr)
- Auðunn illskælda (Auðunn)
- Ámundi Árnason (ÁmÁrn)
- Án bogsveigir (Án)
- Ármóðr (Árm)
- Ármóðr's daughter (Ármóðsd)
- Árni ábóti Jónsson (Árni)
- Árni óreiða Magnússon (Áóreið)
- Ásbjǫrn Þorsteinsson (ÁsbÞ)
- Ásbjǫrn (Ásb)
- Ásdís Bárðardóttir (Ásd)
- Ásgrímr Jónsson (Ásgr)
- Ásgrímr Ketilsson (ÁKet)
- Ásmundr hærulangr (Ásmh)
- Ásmundr kappabana (Ásmk)
- Ásmundr (Ásm)

=== B ===
- Bárðr á Upplǫndum (Bárðr)
- Bersi Skáld-Torfuson (Bersi)
- Bjarmi jarl (Bjarmij)
- Bjarni ...ason (Bjarni)
- Bjarni byskup Kolbeinsson (Bjbp)
- Bjarni gullbrárskáld Hallbjarnarson (BjHall)
- Bjarni Kálfsson (BjKálfs)
- Bjǫrn breiðvíkingakappi Ásbrandsson (Bbreiðv)
- Bjǫrn Hítdœlakappi Arngeirsson (Bjhít)
- Bjǫrn krepphendi (Bkrepp)
- Bjǫrn Ragnarsson (BjRagn)
- Bjǫrn (Bjǫrn)
- Blakkr (Blakkr)
- Bótólfr begla (Bót)
- Bragi inn gamli Boddason (Bragi)
- Brandr inn víðfǫrli (Brandrv)
- Brandr (Brandr)
- Brennu-Njáll Þorgeirsson (Njáll)
- Brúni (Brúni)
- Brúsi Hallason (Brúsi)
- Brynjólfr úlfaldi (Brúlf)
- Busla (Busla)
- Bǫðmóðr Framarsson (Bǫðmóðr)
- Bǫðvarr balti (Balti)
- Bǫlverkr Arnórsson (Bǫlv)

=== D ===
- Dagstyggr Þórðarson (Dagst)

=== E ===
- Egill Skallagrímsson (Egill)
- Eilífr Goðrúnarson (Eil)
- Eilífr kúlnasveinn (Ekúl)
- Eilífr Snorrason (EilSn)
- Einarr draumr Þorsteinsson (Edraum)
- Einarr Gilsson (EGils)
- Einarr skálaglamm Helgason (Eskál)
- Einarr Skúlason (ESk)
- Einarr þambarskelfir Eindriðason (Eþsk)
- Einarr þveræingr Eyjólfsson (Eþver)
- Eindriði Einarsson (Eindr)
- Eiríkr Ragnarsson (EirRagn)
- Eiríkr viðsjá (Eviðs)
- Eiríkr (Eir)
- Eldjárn (Eldj)
- Erringar-Steinn (ErrSt)
- Eyjólfr Brúnason (EBrún)
- Eyjólfr dáðaskáld (Edáð)
- Eyjólfr forni (Eforn)
- Eyjólfr Valgerðarson (EValg)
- Eysteinn Ásgrímsson (Eyst)
- Eysteinn konungr (Eystk)
- Eysteinn Valdason (EVald)
- Eyvindr skáldaspillir Finnsson (Eyv)

=== F ===
- Feima Hrímnisdóttir (Feima)
- Finngálkn (Finng)
- Fjǫlmóðr Skafnǫrtungsson (Fjǫl)
- Forað (Forað)
- Framarr víkingakonungr (Framarr)
- Friðþjófr Þorsteinsson (FriðÞ)

=== G ===
- Gamli gnævaðarskáld (Ggnæv)
- Gamli kanóki (Gamlkan)
- Gauti konungr (Gauti)
- Gestr Þorhallsson (Gestr)
- Gestumblindi (Gestumbl)
- Gillingr Skafnǫrtungsson (Gill)
- Gizurr Grýtingaliði (GizGrý)
- Gizurr svarti (gullbrárskáld) (Gizsv)
- Gizurr Þorvaldsson (Giz)
- Gísl Illugason (Gísl)
- Gísli Súrsson (GSúrs)
- Gísli Þorgautsson (GÞorg)
- Glúmr Geirason (Glúmr)
- Glúmr Þorkelsson (GÞork)
- Grani skáld (Grani)
- Grettir Ásmundarson (Grett)
- Grímkell Bjarnarson (Grímk)
- Grímr Droplaugarson (GDrop)
- Grímr Hjaltason (GrHj)
- Grímr loðinkinni (Gríml)
- Gríss Sæmingsson (Gríss)
- Guðbrandr í Svǫlum (Guðbr)
- Guðlaugr (Guðl)
- Guðmundr Ásbjarnarson (GÁsb)
- Guðmundr Galtason (GGalt)
- Guðmundr Oddson (GOdds)
- Guðmundr Svertingsson (GSvert)
- Gullásu-Þórðr (GullásÞ)
- Gunnarr Hámundarson (GunnHám)
- Gunnarr Lambason (Gunnarr)
- Gunnhildr konungamóðir (Gunnh)
- Gunnlaugr Leifsson (GunnLeif)
- Gunnlaugr ormstunga Illugason (GunnlI)
- Gusi finnakonungr (Gusi)
- Guthormr kǫrtr Helgason (Gkǫrt)
- Guthormr sindri (Gsind)
- Gyðja (Gyðja)
- Gyrðr byskup and Eysteinn Ásgrímsson (GyrEyst)

=== H ===
- Hafliði (Hafl)
- Hallar-Steinn (HSt)
- Hallbjǫrn hali (Hhal)
- Hallbjǫrn Oddsson (Hallbj)
- Halldórr ókristni (Hókr)
- Halldórr Rannveigarson (HalldR)
- Halldórr skvaldri (Hskv)
- Hallfreðr vandræðaskáld Óttarsson (Hfr)
- Hallgrímr (Hallg)
- Halli berserkr (Halli)
- Halli stirði (Halli XI)
- Hallmundr bergbúinn (Hallm)
- Hallmundr (HallmGr)
- Hallr Snorrason (HSn)
- Hallr Þórarinsson breiðmaga (Hbreiðm)
- Hallstein Þengilsson (Hallst)
- Hallvarðr háreksblesi (Hallv)
- Hallvarðr (Hallvarðr)
- Haraldr harðráði Sigurðarson (Hharð)
- Haraldr hárfagri Hálfdanarson (Hhárf)
- Haukr Valdísarson (HaukrV)
- Hákon inn góði Haraldsson (Hákg)
- Hálfr Hjǫrleifsson (Hálfr)
- Hárekr í Þjóttu (Hár)
- Hásteinn Hrómundarson (Hást)
- Hástigi (Hástigi)
- Hávarðr halti ísfirðingr (Hávh)
- Heiðr vǫlva (Heiðv)
- Heiðr (Heiðr)
- Heiðrekr (Heiðrekr)
- Heinrekr (Heinr)
- Helga Bárðardóttir (HelgaB)
- Helgi Ásbjarnarson (HÁsbj)
- Helgi dýr Skefilsson (Hdýr)
- Helgi trausti Óláfsson (HelgÓl)
- Hergunnr (Hergunnr)
- Hervǫr Hundingjadóttir (HervH)
- Hervǫr (Herv)
- Hetta (Hetta)
- Hildibrandr (Hildibrandr)
- Hildigunnr (Hildigunnr)
- Hildr Hrólfsdóttir nefju (Hildr)
- Hjalti Skeggjason (Hjalti)
- Hjálmarr inn hugumstóri (Hjálm)
- Hjálmþér Ingason (Hjþ)
- Hjǫrleifr konungr (Hjǫrleifr)
- Hjǫrtr (Hjǫrtr)
- Hlǫðr Heiðreksson (HlǫðH)
- Hofgarða-Refr Gestsson (Refr)
- Hólmgǫngu-Bersi Véleifsson (HólmgB)
- Hólmgǫngu-Skeggi (HólmgSk)
- Hrafn Ǫnundarson (HrafnǪ)
- Hreggviðr konungr (Hregg)
- Hringr konungr (Hringrk)
- Hrókr inn svarti (Hróksv)
- Hrómundr halti Eyvindarson (Hróm)
- Humli konungr (Humli)
- Hundingi konungr (Hundk)
- Hvítserkr Ragnarsson (HvítRagn)
- Hǫrðr Grímkelsson (HǫrðG)
- Hǫrðr/Hringr (Hǫrðr)

=== I ===
- Illugi bryndœlaskáld (Ill)
- Ingimarr af Aski Sveinsson (Ingimarr)
- Ingimundr Einarsson (IngimE)
- Ingjaldr Geirmundarson (Ingj)
- Innsteinn Gunnlaðarson (Innsteinn)
- Ímsigull Skafnǫrtungsson (Íms)
- Ívarr Ingimundarson (Ív)
- Ívarr Ragnarsson (ÍvRagn)
- Játgeirr Torfason (Játg)
- Jón Þorvaldsson (Jón)
- Jórunn skáldmær (Jór)
- Jǫkull Bárðarson (Jǫk)

=== K ===
- Kali Sæbjarnarson (Kali)
- Karl inn rauði (Karl)
- Kálfr Hallsson (Kálf)
- Kári Sǫlmundarson (Kári)
- Ketill hœngr (Keth)
- Ketilríðr Hólmkelsdóttir (Ketilr)
- Klaufi Snækollsson (Klauf)
- Kleima Hrímnisdóttir (Kleima)
- Klœingr Þorsteinsson (Klœ)
- Kolbeinn Tumason (Kolb)
- Kolgrímr litli (Kolgr)
- Kolli inn prúði (Kolli)
- Kormákr Ǫgmundarson (KormǪ)
- Kráka/Áslaug Sigurðardóttir (KrákÁsl)
- Króka-Refr (KrRef)
- Kveldúlfr Bjálfason (Kveld)

=== L ===
- Leiðólfr skáld (Leiðólfr)
- Leiknir berserkr (Leiknir)
- Loptr Pálsson (Loptr)

=== M ===
- Magnús berfœttr Óláfsson (Mberf)
- Magnús inn góði Óláfsson (Mgóð)
- Magnús Þórðarson (MÞórð)
- Margerðr (Margerðr)
- Markús Skeggjason (Mark)
- Marmennill (Marm)
- Mágus jarl (Mágj)
- Máni (Máni)
- Móðólfr Ketilsson (Móð)

=== N ===
- Narfi (Narfi)
- Nefari (Nefari)
- Neri (Neri)
- Níkulás Bergsson (Ník)

=== O ===
- Oddi inn litli Glúmsson (Oddi)
- Oddr breiðfirðingr (Obreið)
- Oddr kíkinaskáld (Okík)
- Oddr Snorrason (OSnorr)
- Ormarr (Ormarr)
- Ormr Barreyjarskáld (OBarr)
- Ormr Steinþórsson (Ormr)
- Ormr svínfellingr Jónsson (Ormrs)
- Ófeigr Skíðason (Ófeigr)
- Óláfr bjarnylr Hávarðarson (Ólbjarn)
- Óláfr Brynjólfsson (ÓlBrynj)
- Óláfr hvítaskáld Þórðarson (Ólhv)
- Óláfr inn helgi Haraldsson (Ólhelg)
- Óláfr svartaskáld Leggsson (Ólsv)
- Óláfr Tryggvason (ÓTr)
- Ólǫf geisli Þórisdóttir (Ólǫf)
- Óspakr Glúmsson (Óspakr)
- Óttarr svarti (Ótt)

=== P ===
- Páll Þorsteinsson (Páll)

=== R ===
- Ragnarr loðbrók (Rloð)
- Reginn (Reginn)
- Rúnólfr Ketilsson (RKet)
- Rǫgnvaldr jarl and Hallr Þórarinsson (RvHbreiðm)
- Rǫgnvaldr jarl Kali Kolsson (Rv)

=== S ===
- Sigmundr Lambason (Sigmund)
- Sigmundr ǫngull (Sigm)
- Signý Hálfdanardóttir (SigHálf)
- Signý Valbrandsdóttir (SignV)
- Sigurðr jórsalafari Magnússon (Sjórs)
- Sigurðr ormr í auga (Sigoa)
- Sigurðr slembidjákn Magnússon (Slembir)
- Sigurðr (Sigurðr)
- Sigvatr Sturluson (SigvSt)
- Sigvatr Þórðarson (Sigv)
- Sjólfr (Sjólfr)
- Skallagrímr Kveldúlfsson (Skall)
- Skapti Þóroddsson (Skapti)
- Skarpheðinn Njálsson (Skarp)
- Skáldhallr (Skáldh)
- Skáldhelgi Þórðarson (ShÞ)
- Skáldþórir (Skáldþ)
- Skinnhúfa/Hildisif (Skinnhúfa)
- Skraut-Oddr (SkrautO)
- Skúli Þorsteinsson (Skúli)
- Sneglu-Halli (SnH)
- Snjólfr (Snjólfr)
- Snorri goði Þorgrímsson (Snorri)
- Snorri Sturluson (SnSt)
- Snæbjǫrn (Snæbj)
- Snækollr Gunnason (Snæk)
- Sóti (Sóti)
- Starkaðr gamli Stórvirksson (StarkSt)
- Stefnir Þorgilsson (Stefnir)
- Steigar-Þórir Þórðarson (SteigÞ)
- Steinarr Sjónason (StSj)
- Steinarr (Steinarr)
- Steingerðr Þorkelsdóttir (Steing)
- Steinn Herdísarson (Steinn)
- Steinunn Refs (Dálks)dóttir (Steinunn)
- Steinþórr (Steinþ)
- Stjǫrnu-Oddi Helgason (StjOdd)
- Sturla Bárðarson (SturlB)
- Sturla Sigvatsson (SturlaS)
- Sturla Þórðarson (Sturl)
- Sturlaugr inn starfsami Ingólfsson (Sturlst)
- Stúfr inn blindi Þórðarson kattar (Stúfr)
- Styrbjǫrn (Styrb)
- Styrkárr Oddason (Styrkárr)
- Svanr á Svanshóli (Svanr)
- Svartr á Hofstöðum (Svart)
- Sveinn á Bakka (SvB)
- Sveinn tjúguskegg Haraldsson (Svtjúg)
- Sveinn (Sveinn)
- Svertingr Þorleifsson (Svert)

=== T ===
- Tannr Bjarnason (Tannr)
- Tindr Hallkelsson (Tindr)
- Tjǫrvi inn háðsami (Tjǫrvi)
- Torf-Einarr Rǫgnvaldsson (TorfE)
- Torfi Valbrandsson (TorfiV)
- Tóki víkingr (Tóki)
- Trausti Þorgrímsson (Traust)

=== U ===
- Unnr Marðardóttir (Unnr)
- Úlfr inn rauði (Úlfrauð)
- Úlfr stallari Óspaksson (Úlfr)
- Úlfr Uggason (ÚlfrU)
- Útsteinn Gunnlaðarson (Útsteinn)

=== V ===
- Vagn Ákason (Vagn)
- Valgarðr á Velli (Valg)
- Vargeisa/Álfsól (Vargeisa)
- Vetrliði Sumarliðason (Vetrl)
- Vémundr Hrólfsson (Vém)
- Vitgeirr seiðmaðr (Vitg)
- Víga-Glúmr Eyjólfsson (VGl)
- Víga-Styrr Þorgrímsson (Styr)
- Vígbjóðr and Vestmarr (VígVest)
- Vígfúss Víga-Glúmsson (Vígf)
- Víglundr Þorgrímsson (VíglÞ)
- Vǫlu-Steinn (VSt)

=== Y ===
- Ýma trǫllkona (Ýma)

=== Þ ===
- Þjalar-Jón Svipdagsson (ÞjJ)
- Þjóðólfr Arnórsson (ÞjóðA)
- Þjóðólfr ór Hvini (Þjóð)
- Þjóðólfr (Þjóðólfr)
- Þorbjǫrg (Þorb)
- Þorbjǫrn Brúnason (ÞBrún)
- Þorbjǫrn dísarskáld (Þdís)
- Þorbjǫrn hornklofi (Þhorn)
- Þorbjǫrn skakkaskáld (Þskakk)
- Þorbjǫrn svarti (Þsvart)
- Þorbjǫrn þyna (Þþyn)
- Þorbjǫrn ǫngull (Þbj)
- Þorfinnr munnr (Þorf)
- Þorgeirr flekkr (Þflekk)
- Þorgils fiskimaðr (Þfisk)
- Þorgils Hǫlluson (ÞórgHǫll)
- Þorgils Oddason (ÞorgO)
- Þorgrímr goði Þorsteinsson (Þorggoð)
- Þórhallr veiðimaðr (Þorhv)
- Þórhildr skáldkona (Þorh)
- Þorkell elfaraskáld (Þelf)
- Þorkell Gíslason (ÞGísl)
- Þorkell hamarskáld (Þham)
- Þorkell í Hraundal (ÞorkHraun)
- Þorkell klyppr Þórðarson (Þklypp)
- Þorkell Skallason (ÞSkall)
- Þorkell Súrsson (ÞSúrs)
- Þorleifr jarlsskáld Rauðfeldarson (Þjsk)
- Þorleifr skúma Þorkelsson (Þskúm)
- Þorleikr fagri (Þfagr)
- Þormóðr Kolbrúnarskáld (Þorm)
- Þormóðr Óláfsson (ÞormÓl)
- Þormóðr Trefilsson (ÞTref)
- Þorsteinn draummaðrinn (Þorstk)
- Þorsteinn drómundr (Þstdr)
- Þorsteinn tjaldstœðingr Ásgrímsson (Þtjald)
- Þorsteinn Þorvarðsson (ÞorstÞ)
- Þorvaldr blǫnduskáld (Þblǫnd)
- Þorvaldr Hjaltason (ÞHjalt)
- Þorvaldr inn víðfǫrli Koðránsson (Þvíðf)
- Þorvaldr veili (Þveil)
- Þorvarðr tréfótr (Þtréf)
- Þorvarðr Þorgeirsson (Þorv)
- Þórarinn loftunga, author of Hofuðlausn and Tøgdrápa.
- Þórarinn Skeggjason (ÞSkegg)
- Þórarinn stuttfeldr (Þstf)
- Þórarinn svarti máhlíðingr Þórólfsson (Þmáhl)
- Þórarinn (Þór)
- Þórálfr (-valdr) (Þórálfr)
- Þórðr bóndi (ÞórðVígl)
- Þórðr hreða (Þórðh)
- Þórðr Kolbeinsson (ÞKolb)
- Þórðr mauraskáld (Þmaur)
- Þórðr rúfeyjaskáld (Þrúf)
- Þórðr Særeksson (Sjáreksson) (ÞSjár)
- Þórðr vazfirðingr (Þvazf)
- Þórir at Ǫxnakeldu (ÞórǪx)
- Þórir hundsfótr (Þórhunds)
- Þórir jǫkull (Þjǫk)
- Þórir snepill Ketilsson (Þórsnep)
- Þráinn Sigfússon (ÞráS)
- Þrándr í Gǫtu (Þrándr)
- Þuríðr Óláfsdóttir pá (Þuríðr)

=== Ǫ ===
- Ǫgmundr Eyþjófsbani (ǪgmEyb)
- Ǫgmundr sneis Þorvarðsson (Ǫgm)
- Ǫgvaldr konungr
- Ǫlvir Herrauðsson (ǪlvH)
- Ǫlvir hnúfa (Ǫlv)
- Ǫlvǫr (Ǫlvǫr)
- Ǫnundr Ófeigsson (ǪnÓf)
- Ǫrvar-Oddr (ǪrvOdd)

=== Anonymous skaldic poetry ===
- Anonymous Lausavísur (Anon) - Unknown skald or skalds from a number of texts, mentioned as Lausavísur or Lausavísa.
- Anonymous Poems (Anon) - A collection of anonymous poems, authors unknown.
- Anonymous Rune Poems (Anon) - An Icelandic Rune Poem and a Norwegian Rune Poem, authors unknown.
- Anonymous Þulur (Þul) - A collection of 66 texts from the 12th century, author unknown.
- Middle Ages (Run)
- Mythological sources (Myth)
- Older Futhark (Run)
- Viking Age (Run)

== See also ==
- List of Icelandic writers
- Icelandic literature
