= Gudröd the Radiant =

Son of Norwegian king Harald Fairhair

- Born: Norway
- Died: Off the coast of Jæren, Norway
- Issue: None recorded
- House: Fairhair dynasty
- Father: Harald Fairhair
- Mother: Snæfrithr Svásadottir

Gudröd the Radiant (Old Norse: Guðrøðr ljómi) was, according to medieval tradition, a son of the Norwegian king Harald Fairhair with his Sami-wife Snæfrithr Svásadottir.

== Saga account ==
Gudröd the Radiant was one of four sons Harald had with Snæfrithr. He was fostered by a man known as Thjodolf of Hvinir. Gudröd and his brothers were described as unruly. Harald Fairhair had pushed Gudröd and his brothers away after the death of their mother. Gudröd and his brother Halfdan Long-Leg were responsible for murdering Rognvald Eysteinsson and 60 of his men by burning them inside a structure in an attempt to claim his lands. Upon learning of this event, Harald flew into a rage and sent out a great force against Gudröd who was put under Harald's personal observance. When Gudröd was allowed to leave to visit Thjodolf, he was warned by Thjodolf to stay and wait for a storm to pass. The eager Gudröd did not heed this advice and set sail. His ship then sank outside Jæren and he and his crew drowned.
