= Snæfrithr Svásadottir =

Wife of King Harald Fairhair

Snæfríðr Svásadóttir (or Snjófríðr Svásadóttir, Norwegian: Snøfrid Svåsedatter) also called Snæfríðr finnska (‘Snæfríthr the Finnish/Sami’) was, according to medieval tradition a wife of the Norwegian king Harald Fairhair. The legend is described in both Heimskringla and Ágrip, and she is briefly mentioned in Orkneyinga saga and alluded to in Málshattakvæði. She is described as a Sami woman and is, according to the sagas, the ancestor of Harald Hardrada. With the exception of Ragnhild the Mighty, she is the only wife of Harald Fairhair mentioned by name outside of Heimskringla.

Flateyjarbók's Haralds þáttr hárfagra's first chapter centers around the story of Snæfríðr and Harald and credits Snæfríðardrápa, a skaldic "drapa" about Snæfríðr, to Harald.

== Saga account ==
The sagas tell of king Harald being at a yule feast in Gudbrandsdalen at the Tofti estate, when a Finnish (Sami) giant called Svási arrived and invited him to his hut. In Svási's hut the king was introduced to the giant's daughter Snæfríðr, who poured a drink for him. The king was overcome with lust and wanted to bed her, but Svási would not allow his daughter to be a concubine and so the two were married. Harald is said to have spent all of his time with Snæfríðr and neglected his kingdom. During their three year long marriage she gave birth to four children: Sigurðr hrísi, Hálfdan háleggr, Guðrøðr ljómi and Rǫgnvaldr réttilbeini.

When Snæfríðr suddenly died, Harald was beside himself with grief. Her body was laid in state but it did not decompose or grow pale, giving the appearance that she was sleeping peacefully. Thus Harald sat weeping over her for three years, hoping that she would come back to life. As Harald was troubled by Snæfríðr’s death, so too were his people troubled by his neglect of his duties. At last an old man known as Þorleifr the Wise decided to break the illusion. He convinced the king to leave the chamber where the queen lay and told him that it was not honorable to let the dead lie in the same clothes in which she had perished. Harald agreed to change her clothes, but as soon as his servants moved her body it turned blue and began to smell. Men hurried to prepare a pyre, but before they had time to burn her, toads, snakes and lizards were crawling out of her body, and soon thereafter it had mouldered to dust.

When Harald realized Snæfríðr had been a witch he became furious and had all their sons exiled. Since that day Harald became ill-disposed towards magicians. When Rǫgnvaldr followed in his mother's footsteps, Harald sent his most loyal and beloved son Eirikr Bloodaxe to murder him.

== Popular culture ==
A character inspired by Snæfríðr appears in season 5 of History Channel's Vikings, played by Norwegian actress Dagny Backer Johnsen.
