= Bruno of Querfurt =

10th/11th-century monk, bishop, missionary and martyr

Saint Bruno of Querfurt, O.S.B. Cam.
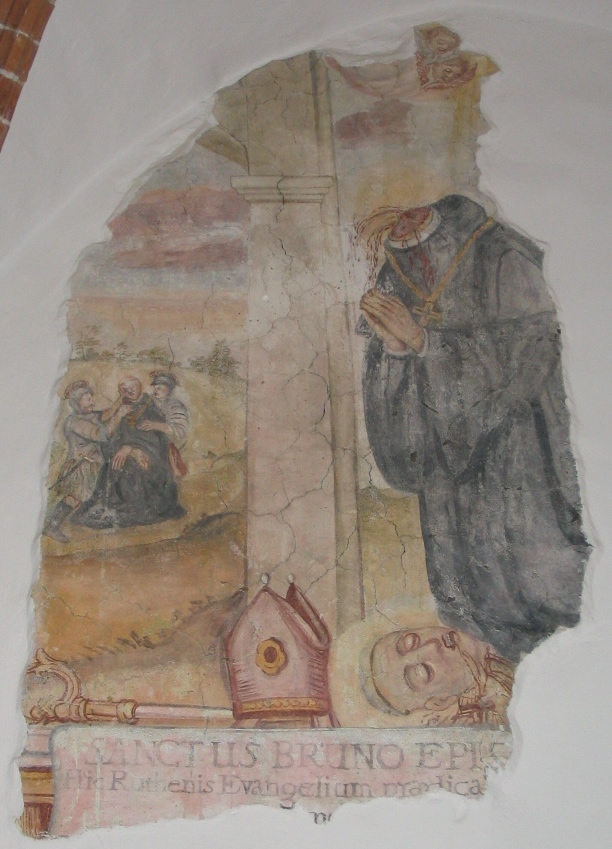
- A medieval fresco depicting St Bruno's death

Bishop and Martyr; Second Apostle of the Prussians
- Born: c. 974; Querfurt, Holy Roman Empire (now in Saxony-Anhalt)
- Died: 14 February 1009
- Venerated in: Eastern Orthodox Church; Roman Catholic Church (Camaldolese Order)
- Feast: 9 March

Bruno of Querfurt, O.S.B. Cam. (German: Brun von Querfurt; c. 974 – 14 February or 9 March 1009), also known as Brun, was a Christian missionary, bishop, Camaldolese monk and martyr. He was active in the eastern regions of the Holy Roman Empire and became one of the leading figures in the early Christian missions to the peoples of northeastern Europe. Bruno was killed in Prussia, near the frontier of Kyivan Rus' and Lithuania, while attempting to convert the Old Prussians to Christianity. He is venerated as the "Second Apostle of the Prussians".

Bruno was educated at the cathedral school of Magdeburg and entered the service of the imperial court. He later joined the monastic community of Avellanese hermits under Saint Romuald, becoming part of the early Camaldolese movement. His spiritual formation combined Western monastic discipline with eremitical traditions, shaping the missionary zeal that defined his later career.

Bruno was appointed a missionary bishop without a fixed see and began a series of missions sanctioned by both the papacy and the Holy Roman Empire. He worked among the Magyars in Hungary, among the pechenegs on the steppe frontier, and later in the lands of the Rus'. His writings, including the Life of Adalbert of Prague and the Life of the Five Brothers, provide significant insight into the politics, diplomacy, and ecclesiastical relations of Central and Eastern Europe around the year 1000.

In 1009, during a mission to the Prussians undertaken with imperial and papal approval, Bruno and his eighteen companions were captured and executed. News of his death was recorded in the Quedlinburg Annals, which provides the earliest known written reference to Lithuania. Bruno was later honored as a martyr by both the Catholic and Eastern Orthodox traditions. Although never formally canonized, he has been remembered as a model missionary and ascetic, and his feast day is celebrated on 15 October.

== Biography ==
=== Early life ===
Bruno was from a noble family of Querfurt (now in Saxony-Anhalt). He is rumoured to have been a relative of the Holy Roman Emperor Otto III. Through his mother Matilda, he was related to the future Bishop of Merseburg, Thietmar, with whom he studied at the cathedral school in Magdeburg, the seat of Adalbert of Magdeburg, the teacher and namesake of Adalbert of Prague. While still a youth, he was made a canon of the Cathedral of Magdeburg. The fifteen-year-old Otto III made Bruno a part of his royal court. In 995, Otto III appointed Bruno as one of his court chaplains.

Despite having a clear path to a career at court and as a bishop, Bruno, perhaps influenced by the martyrdom of St. Adalbert, went to Rome and entered the monastery of St. Boniface and St. Alexius on the Aventine Hill. It was then that he probably took the name Boniface, after the Anglo-Saxon missionary bishop who evangelized the Germanic tribes. In 1001, Bruno entered a Benedictine monastery of Pereum, near Ravenna that Otto III had founded, and later underwent strict ascetic training under the guidance of Romuald.

=== Missionary life ===
The emperor founded this monastery to evangelise the Slavs, and Bruno soon became involved in this endeavour. In agreement with the Polish prince Bolesław Chrobry, the brothers Benedict and John were sent to Poland, where they founded a monastery in Międzyrzecz for the purpose of evangelizing the Polabian Slavs. Bruno was supposed to join them. Still, the emperor's death and the ensuing turmoil prevented him from traveling to Poland. He stayed in Italy studying the language and awaiting the Apostolic appointment by Pope Sylvester II. In addition, the monks from Międzyrzecz were murdered on the night of 11–12 November 1003, by opponents of Prince Bolesław.

In 1003, Pope Sylvester II appointed Bruno, at the age of 33, to head a mission amongst the pagan peoples of Eastern Europe. Bruno left Rome in 1004, and having been named an archbishop, was consecrated in February of that year by Archbishop Tagino of Magdeburg. Owing to a regional conflict between the Holy Roman Emperor Henry II and Duke Boleslaus I of Poland, Bruno could not go directly to Poland so he set out for Hungary. There, he visited the places Adalbert of Prague had attended.

Bruno tried to persuade Ahtum, the Duke of Banat, who was under the jurisdiction of Patriarchate of Constantinople, to accept the jurisdiction of the Bishop of Rome, but this precipitated a large controversy leading to organised opposition from local monks. Bruno elected to gracefully exit the region after he first finished his book, the famous "Life of Adalbert of Prague," a literary memorial giving a history of the (relatively recent) conversion of the Hungarians.

After this diplomatic failure, Bruno went to Kiev, where Grand Duke Vladimir I authorized him to make Christian converts among the Pechenegs, semi-nomadic Turkic peoples living between the Danube and the Don rivers. Bruno spent five months there and baptized some thirty adults. He helped to bring about a peace treaty between them and the ruler of Kiev.

Before leaving for Poland, Bruno consecrated a bishop for the Pechenegs. While in Poland, he consecrated the first Bishop of Sweden and is said to have sent emissaries to baptise the king of Sweden, whose mother had come from Poland. Bruno found out that his friend Benedict and four companions had been killed by robbers in 1003. Bruno took eyewitness accounts and wrote down a touching history of the so-called Five Martyred Brothers.

=== Mission to Prussia and death ===
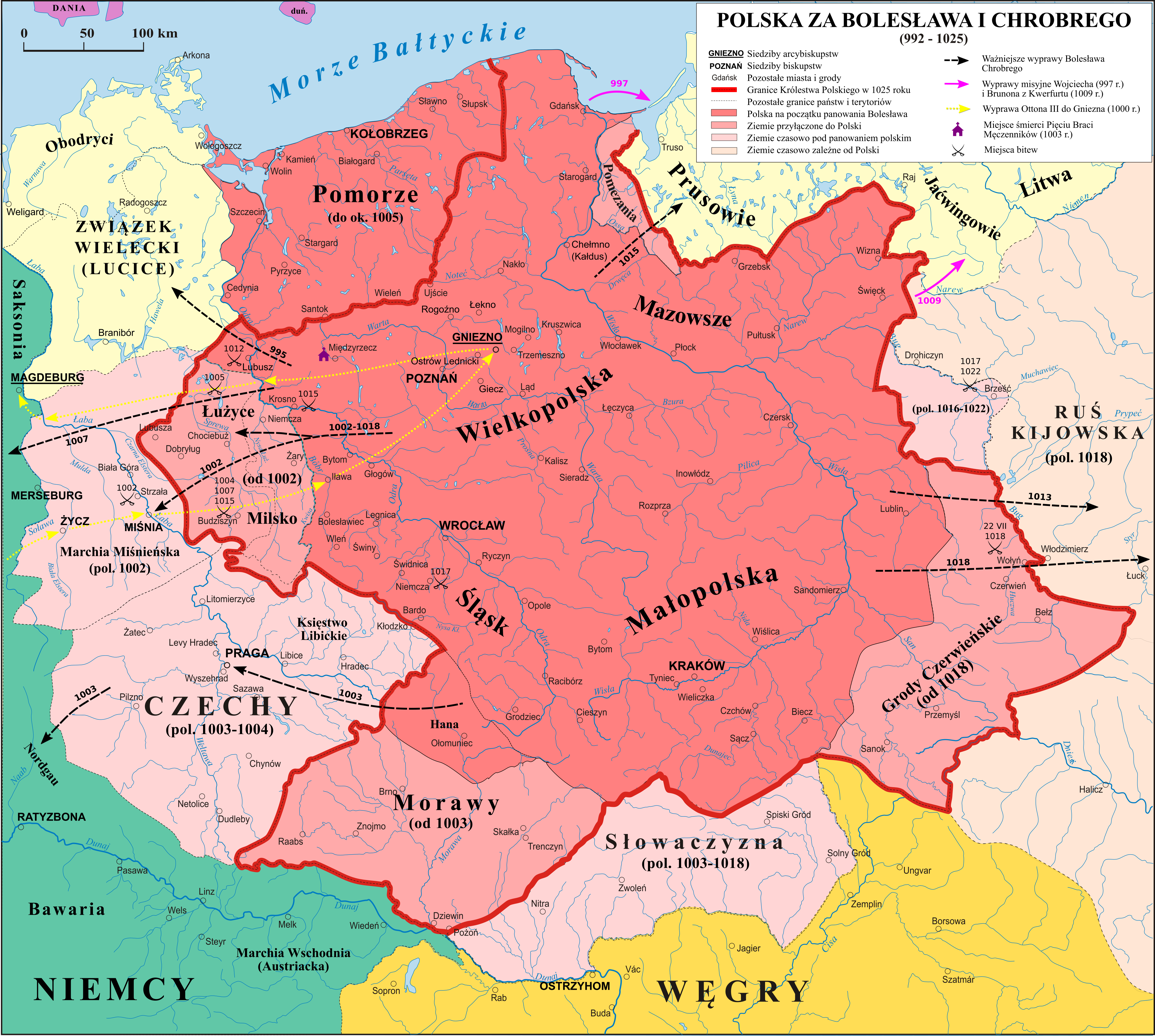
Poland and Prussia during the reign of Bolesław the Brave

In the autumn or at the end of 1008, Bruno and eighteen companions set out to found a mission among the Old Prussians; they succeeded in converting Netimer and then travelled east, likely towards Yotvingia.

Bruno met opposition in his efforts to evangelise the borderland, and when he persisted in disregarding their warnings, he was beheaded on 14 February (or 9 or 14 March) 1009, and most of his eighteen companions were hanged by Zebeden, brother of Netimer. Duke Boleslaus the Brave bought the bodies and brought them to Poland. (It was supposed that they were laid to rest in Przemyśl, where some historians place Bruno's diocese; such localisation of Bruno's burial place is hardly probable because Przemyśl then belonged to Orthodox Kyivan Rus' through 1018.) The Annals of Magdeburg, Thietmar of Merseburg's Chronicle, the Annals of Quedlinburg, various works of Magdeburg Bishops, and many other written sources from the 11th–15th centuries record this story.

Soon after his death, Bruno and his companions were venerated as martyrs, and Bruno was soon canonized. It was said that Braunsberg was named after Bruno.

== See also ==
- Name of Lithuania
- Christianization of Lithuania

== Bibliography ==
- A. Bumblauskas. Lithuania's Millennium –Millennium Lithuaniae Or What Lithuania Can Tell the World on this Occasion. Lietuvos istorijos studijos, 2009, t. 23, p. 127–158.
- D. Baronas. ST BRUNO OF QUERFURT: THE MISSIONARY VOCATION. LITHUANIAN HISTORICAL STUDIES, 2009, t. 14. p. 41–52.
- Maciejewski, Jacek (2010). Średniowieczny misjonarz a millenium Litwy Bruno z Kwerfurtu i jego ostatnia misja (PDF). Językowe i kulturowe dziedzictwo Wielkiego Księstwa Litewskiego. Księga jubileuszowa na 1000‑lecie Litwy. Bydgoszcz.
- Wood, Ian (2014). "The Latin Hagiography of Mission from Rimbert to Bruno of Querfurt". The Cyril and Methodius Mission and Europe: 1150 Years Since the Arrival of the Thessaloniki Brothers in Great Moravia. pp. 34–39. ISBN 978-80-86023-51-9. OS LG 2023-08-18.
