= Haustlöng =

Skaldic poem

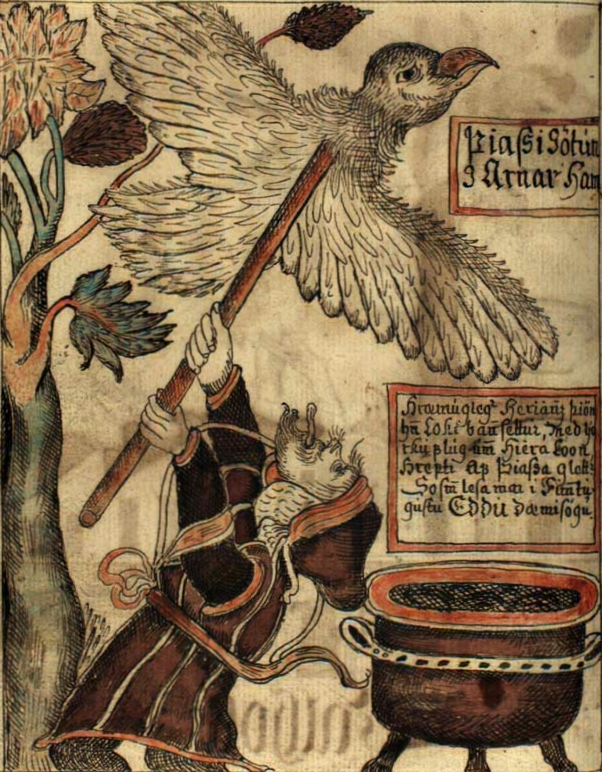
Loki strikes Þjazi with a rod in this picture from an 18th-century Icelandic manuscript.

Haustlǫng (Old Norse: 'Autumn-long'; anglicized as Haustlöng) is a skaldic poem composed around the beginning of the 10th century by the Norwegian skald Þjóðólfr of Hvinir.

The poem has been preserved in the 13th-century Prose Edda by Snorri Sturluson, who quotes two groups of stanzas from it and some verses to illustrate technical features of skaldic diction. Snorri also drew inspiration from Þjóðólfr to redact his own version of the myths told in Haustlöng.

The poem describes mythological scenes said by the skald to have been painted on a shield: Loki's betraying of Iðunn, the goddess who kept the Æsir eternally young - who was snatched from them by the jötunn Þjazi after he had assumed eagle form; and Thor's victorious combat against the strongest of the jötnar, Hrungnir.

== Title ==
The title of the poem, Haustlǫng, translated as 'Autumn-long', may refer to its period of composition or gestation by the skald, identified from a relatively early period with Þjóðólfr of Hvinir.

== Text ==
=== Abduction of Iðunn ===
The stanzas 1–13 of the poem depict the encounter of the Æsir (gods) Odin, Loki and Hœnir with the jötunn Þjazi in the form of an eagle.

How can I provide a repayment for the war-wall-bridge [shield]? [I received a well-decorated...] voice-cliff [shield] from Thorleif. I can see the uncertain situation of three god-bold deities and Thiassi on the brightly-finished side of the battle-sheet [shield].

The lady-wolf [Thiassi] flew noisily to meet the commanders of the crew [the Æsir] no short time ago in an old old-one’s [eagle’s] form. Long ago the eagle alighted where the Æsir put their meat in an earth-oven. The rock-Gefn-[giantess-]refuge-[cave-]god [giant] was not found guilty of cowardice.

— Þjóðólfr of Hvinir, Haustlöng, 1–2 [Skáld. 18–22], trans. A. Faulkes, 1987.

As the three gods Odin, Loki and Hœnir are trying to cook an ox, the giant Þjazi, who has assumed eagle form, asks for a share of the meat. Loki strikes at him with a staff, but the weapon sticks to the eagle and to Loki's hand as the bird flies off. The eagle finally agrees to release Loki on condition that he deliver up to him Iðunn and the apples which are the "gods’ old-age medicine".

The bird of blood [eagle], happy with its booty, flew a long distance with the wise god, so that the wolf’s father [Loki] was about to rip in two. Then Thor’s friend — heavy Lopt [Loki] had collapsed — was forced to beg Midiung’s mate [the giant] as hard as he could for quarter.

The scion of Hymir’s race [giants] instructed the crew-guider, crazy with pain, to bring to him the maid who knew the Æsir’s old-age cure [Idunn]. The thief of Brising’s girdle [Brisingamen] afterwards caused the gods’ lady [Idunn] to go into the rock-Nidud’s [giant’s] courts to Brunnakr’s bench.

— Þjóðólfr of Hvinir, Haustlöng, 8–9 [Skáld. 22–23], trans. A. Faulkes, 1987.

Without Iðunn, tells the poet, "all Ingi-Freyr’s kin [the Æsir] became old and grey in their assembly; the powers were rather ugly in form". The gods then catch Loki and force him to get Iðunn back: "‘You shall be trapped, Loki,’ the angry one spoke thus, ‘unless by some scheme you bring back the renowned maid, enlarger of the fetters' [gods'] joy." In the less cryptic form of the episode recounted in the Prose Edda, we are told that Loki then borrows Freyja's falcon skin cloak in order to fly to Jötunheimar in bird form. There the Jötnar direct a storm-wind against the transformed god to keep him out of their abode, but nonetheless Loki is able to fly off with Idunn clutched in his claws in the form of a nut. Þjazi gives chase in eagle form but is burnt in a bonfire kindled by the Aesir just after Loki has cleared the battlements of Asgard and ducked down to hide at the foot of the wall.

Shafts soon began to burn, for the great powers [gods] had shaved them; and the son of Greip’s wooer [a giant] is scorched. There is a sudden swerve in his travel. This is depicted on my mountain-Finn’s [giant’s, Hrungnir’s] sole- bridge [pedestal, shield]. I received the border’s moving cliff [shield] decorated with horrors from Thorleif.

— Þjóðólfr of Hvinir, Haustlöng, 13 [Skáld. 22–23], trans. A. Faulkes, 1987.

=== Thor's duel with Hrungnir ===
In the stanzas 14–20 of Haustlöng, Þjóðólfr depicts Thor's journey to the duel with the jötunn Hrungnir while the entire cosmos reacts. Then Hrungnir and Thor fight by hurling their weapons at each other (the jötunn's whetstone and Thor's hammer), and the poem alludes at the end to the removal of the piece of whetstone from Thor's head. In contrast to Snorri Sturluson's account, Þjóðólfr lays more emphasis upon Thor's journey to the battle, accompanied by noise and flames, while Snorri makes relatively little of it and also describes Hrungnir's journey. Thor's servant Þjálfi and Hrungnir's clay-made giant Mokkurkálfi are absent from Þjóðólfr’s version.

Also can be seen on the circle [of the shield], O cave-fire-[gold-]tree [man], how the terror of giants [Thor] made a visit to the mound of Griotun. The son of Iord drove to the game of iron [battle] and the moon’s way [sky] thundered beneath him. Wrath swelled in Meili’s brother [Thor].

All the hawks’ sanctuaries [skies] found themselves burning because of Ull’s stepfather, and the ground all low was battered with hail, when the goats drew the temple-power [Thor] of the easy-chariot forward to the encounter with Hrungnir. Svolnir’s widow [lord, earth] practically split apart.

— Þjóðólfr of Hvinir, Haustlöng, 14–15 [Skáld. 17–18], trans. A. Faulkes, 1987.

=== Other verses ===
Two other verses of Haustlöng have survived for they are also cited in the 13th-century Prose Edda:

- "Middlingly free of deceit, he was a slow provider of service to the god. The helmet-capped educator [Odin] of the fetters declared there was something behind it."
- "The lady-wolf [Thiassi] flew noisily to meet the commanders of the crew [the Æsir] no short time ago in an old old-one’s form."

Two other verses attributed to Þjóðólfr by Snorri in the Prose Edda were instead redacted by the 9th-century skald Þorbjörn Hornklofi.

== See also ==
- Ekphrasis
