= Halfdan Long-Leg =

Viking warrior

Halfdan Long-Leg (Old Norse: Hálfdan háleggur, Norwegian: Halvdan Hålegg) was a Viking-Age warrior who lived in the latter half of the 9th century. He was the son of King Harald Fairhair and a Sámi woman named Snæfrithr Svásadottir.

Snorri Sturluson in Heimskringla states that Halfdan was one of Harald's many sons who were involved in a power struggle with one another. Harald Fairhair had pushed Halfdan and his brothers away after the death of their mother. Halfdan and his brother Gudröd the Radiant were responsible for murdering Rognvald Eysteinsson and 60 of his men by burning them inside a structure in an attempt to claim his lands. Upon learning of this event, Harald flew into a rage and sent out a great force against Gudrød who was put under Harald's personal observance. Rognvald's son Torf-Einarr performed the Blood eagle ritual on Halfdan in retaliation after a battle. Harald made Rognvald's son Thorir Earl of Møre and gave his daughter Alof to him in marriage.

== See also ==
- Orkneyinga saga

== Other sources ==
- Crawford, Barbara (1987) Scandinavian Scotland (Leicester University Press) ISBN 978-0-7185-1282-8
- Muir, Tom (2005) Orkney in the Sagas: The Story of the Earldom of Orkney as told in the Icelandic Sagas (The Orcadian. Kirkwall) ISBN 978-0-9548862-3-3
- Pálsson, Hermann and Edwards, Paul Geoffrey (1981) Orkneyinga Saga: The History of the Earls of Orkney (Penguin Classics) ISBN 978-0-14-044383-7
