= Ermanaric =

4th-century king of the Goths

King of the Greuthungi
- Reign: c. 296–376
- Successor: Vithimiris
- Born: c. 291
- Died: 376 (Aged about 85)
- House: Amali

Ermanaric (Note: Gothic: *𐌰𐌹𐍂𐌼𐌰𐌽𐌰𐍂𐌴𐌹𐌺𐍃, romanized: *Aírmanareiks; Latin: Ermanaricus or Hermanaricus; Old English: Eormanrīc [ˈeorˠmɑnriːtʃ]; Old Norse: Jǫrmunrekkr [ˈjɔrmunrekr], Middle High German: Ermenrîch) (died 376) was a Greuthungian king who before the Hunnic invasion ruled a sizable portion of Oium, the part of Scythia inhabited by the Goths at the time. His domain stretched across Eastern Europe, roughly between the Dniester and Don rivers, the Pripet Marshes, and extending toward the Baltic and Volga regions. He is mentioned in two Roman sources: the contemporary writings of Ammianus Marcellinus, and in Getica by the sixth-century historian Jordanes. He also appears in a fictionalized form in later Germanic heroic legends.

Modern historians disagree on the size of Ermanaric's realm. Herwig Wolfram postulates that he at one point ruled a realm stretching from the Baltic Sea to the Black Sea as far eastwards as the Ural Mountains. Peter Heather is skeptical of the claim that Ermanaric ruled all Goths except the Tervingi, and furthermore points to the fact that such an enormous empire would have been larger than any known Gothic political unit, that it would have left bigger traces in the sources and that the sources on which the claim is based are not nearly reliable enough to be taken at face value.

== Etymology ==
The first element of the name Ermanaric appears to be based on the Proto-Germanic root *ermena-, meaning 'universal'. The second element is from the element *-rīks, Gothic reiks, meaning 'ruler'; this is found frequently in Gothic royal names.

== In Roman sources ==
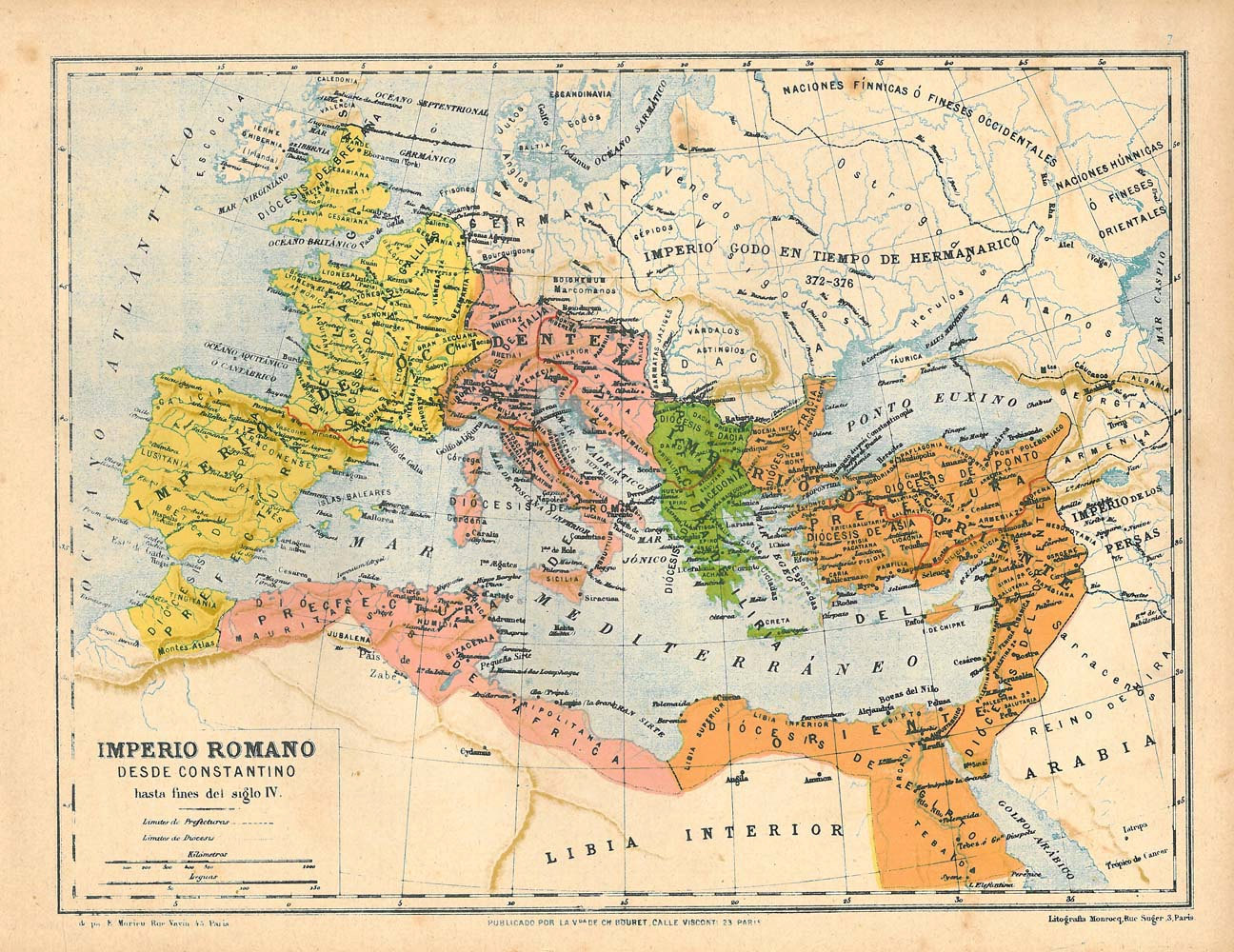
Ermanaric's kingdom at the end of the fourth century (a map from 1899).

According to Ammianus, Ermanaric was "a most warlike king" who eventually committed suicide, faced with the aggression of the Alani and of the Huns, who invaded his territories in the 370s. Ammianus says he "ruled over extensively wide and fertile regions". Ammianus also says that after Ermanaric's death, a certain Vithimiris was elected as the new king.

According to Jordanes' Getica, Ermanaric ruled the realm of Oium. Jordanes describes him as a "Gothic Alexander" who "ruled all the nations of Scythia and Germania as they were his own". Jordanes also states that the king put to death a young woman named Sunilda (Svanhildr) with the use of horses, as punishment for her husband's treason. Thereupon her two brothers, Sarus and Ammius, severely wounded Ermanaric, leaving him unfit to defend his kingdom from Hunnic incursions. Variations of this legend had a profound effect on medieval Germanic literature, including that of England and Scandinavia (see Jonakr's sons). Jordanes claims that he successfully ruled the Goths until his death aged 110.

Edward Gibbon accepts the accounts of Ammianus and Jordanes as historical, reporting that Ermanaric, over the course of a reign lasting approximately 30 years, from 337 to 367 AD, successively subjugated or exacted tribute from neighboring groups, including the Thervingi, Heruli, Venedi, Sclaveni, Antes and Aestii, thereby establishing a realm that stretched from the Baltic to the Black Sea; and died aged 110 of a wound inflicted by the brothers of a woman whom he had cruelly executed for her husband's revolt, being succeeded by his brother Vithimiris.

== In Germanic sources and legends ==
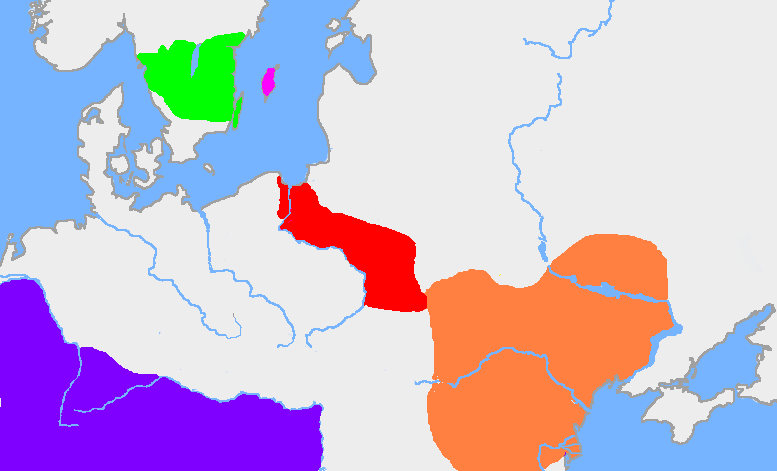
Migration of the Goths: Land of the Geats (Götaland) The island of Gotland Wielbark culture in the early 3rd century Chernyakhov culture, in the early 4th century Roman Empire

Ermanaric appears in a variety of different Germanic heroic legends.

Jǫrmunrekkr is the Old Norse form of the name. Ermanaric appears in Anglo-Saxon and Scandinavian legend. In the former, the poem Beowulf focused on the image of "Eormenric's wiles and hatred". He is described in the tenth century poem Deor as a powerful but treacherous king: "We have heard of the wolfish mind of Eormanric: far and wide he ruled the people of the realm of the Goths: he was a cruel king".

The death of Svanhildr (Svanhildr Sigurðardóttir) and Ermanaric's (Jörmunrek) subsequent death at the hands of Jonakr's sons occupies an important place in the world of Germanic legend. The tale is retold in many northern European stories, including the Norse poems Ragnarsdrápa, Hamðismál and Guðrúnarhvöt, the Prose Edda and the Volsunga Saga; the Norwegian Ragnarsdrápa; the Danish Gesta Danorum; and the German Nibelungenlied and Annals of Quedlinburg.

In the Norse Thidreks Saga, translated from Low German sources, Ermanaric is ill-advised by his treacherous counsellor Bicke, Bikka, Sifka, or Seveke (who wants revenge for the rape of his wife by Ermanaric), with the result that the king puts his own wife to death for supposed adultery with his son; he is thereafter crippled by his brothers-in-law in revenge.

In the Middle High German poems Dietrichs Flucht, the Rabenschlacht, and Alpharts Tod about Dietrich of Bern, Ermanaric is Dietrich's uncle who has driven his nephew into exile. The early modern Low German poem Ermenrichs Tod recounts a garbled version of Ermanaric's death reminiscent of the scene told in Jordanes and Scandinavian legend.

== Name ==
Ermanaric's Gothic name is reconstructed as *Airmanareiks. It is recorded in the various Latinized forms:

- in Jordanes' Getica, he is called Ermanaricus or Hermanaricus, but some of the manuscripts even have Armanaricus, Hermericus, Hermanericus etc.
- in Ammianus' Res gestae, he is Ermenrichus (his name occurs only once).

In medieval Germanic heroic legend, the name appears as:

- Old English Eormenric in Beowulf; the alternative spelling Eormanric occurs in the poems Deor and Widsith,
- Old Norse Jǫrmunrekkr
  - (or, borrowed from Low German) Ermenrekur, Old Swedish Ermenrik or Ermentrik in the Swedish Didrik Saga,
- Middle High German Ermenrîch.

Since the name Heiðrekr may have been confused with Ermanaric through folk etymology, Ermanaric is possibly identifiable with Heiðrekr Ulfhamr of the Hervarar saga.

== See also ==
- Berig
- Filimer
- List of longest-reigning monarchs

== Works cited ==
- Gillespie, George T. (1973). Catalogue of Persons Named in German Heroic Literature, 700-1600: Including Named Animals and Objects and Ethnic Names. Oxford: Oxford University. ISBN 9780198157182.
- Heinzle, Joachim (1999). Einführung in die mittelhochdeutsche Dietrichepik. Berlin, New York: De Gruyter. pp. 58–82. ISBN 3-11-015094-8.
- Millet, Victor (2008). Germanische Heldendichtung im Mittelalter. Berlin, New York: de Gruyter. pp. 332–370. ISBN 978-3-11-020102-4.
