= Ragnarsdrápa =

Skaldic poem

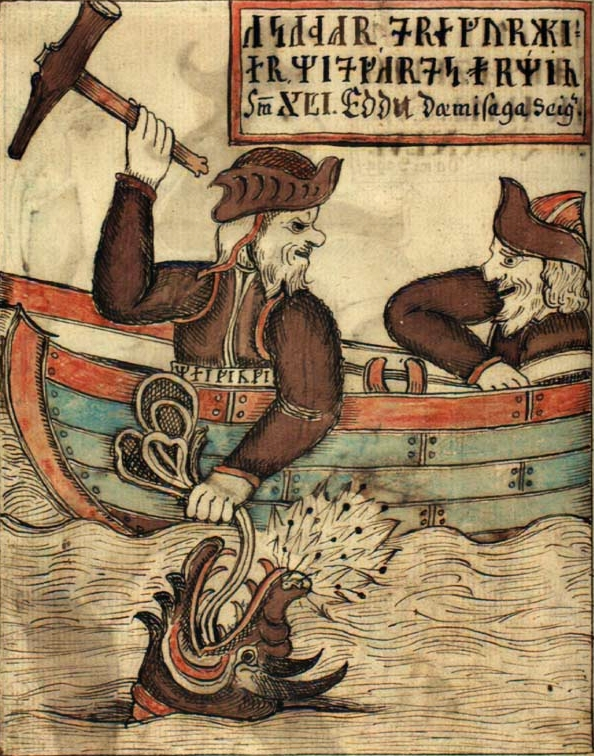
One of the decorations on Ragnarr's shield probably showed Thor's fishing trip. This illustration of the scene is from an 18th-century Icelandic manuscript.

Ragnarsdrápa (Old Norse: ‘Drápa about Ragnarr’) is a skaldic poem attributed to the oldest known skald, Bragi inn gamli (‘the old’) Boddason, who lived in the 9th century. Bragi describes the myths depicted on a decorated shield given to him by a certain Ragnar.

The poem is often compared with other early Skaldic examples of ekphrasis, especially Haustlöng and Húsdrápa, which also describe artworks depicting mythological scenes. Like Haustlöng, it uses archaic and complex kennings in a manner that strains the syntax.

== The identity of Ragnar ==
The poem is entitled Ragnar’s drápa, but the identity of Ragnar is unclear. According to the refrain,

Ræs gǫfumk reiðar mána
Ragnarr ok fjǫl sagna.

‘Ragnarr gave me a moon of the chariot of Rær <sea-king> [SHIP > SHIELD] and a multitude of stories.’

The poem affords a single clue about his identity; in stanza 2 we learn that he was the son of Sigurðr. Snorri Sturluson considered him to be the Scandinavian king Ragnar Lodbrok (whose father was Sigurd Ring), and even calls the poem Ragnars drápa loðbrókar (‘the drápa of Ragnar Lodbrok’), but Vésteinn Ólason argues that it was likely addressed to a later Ragnar. Some earlier scholars thought that it was instead composed for the Swedish king Björn at Haugi, at whose court Bragi was a skald.

== Text ==
The poem describes two myths depicted on the shield,

- the attack of Hamdir and Sorli against king Jörmunrekkr, and
- the never-ending battle between Heðinn and Hǫgni.

Additional fragments of Bragi’s poetry sometimes thought to belong to the Ragnarsdrápa include

- Thor's fishing for Jörmungandr (The Midgard Serpent)
- Gefjun's ploughing of Zealand from the soil of Sweden

The extant fragments of Ragnarsdrápa are preserved in Snorri Sturluson's Prose Edda. The episodes of Hamdir and Sorli and Heðinn and Hǫgni are explicitly ascribed to Ragnarsdrápa while the other parts have traditionally been inferred by scholars to belong to the same poem. In its complete state the poem would then have described four quarters of the shield, in four stanzas each with, presumably, a lost refrain.

== Style and metre ==
Although the dróttkvætt metre violates some of the rules developed later, it is well executed; this and the complexity of language demonstrate that there had already been considerable development of skaldic verse. More specifically, the consistent system of hendingar (rhymes between syllables) seen in later dróttkvætt poetry was not fully established in Bragi’s time. In later dróttkvætt odd lines generally have skothending, and even lines always have aðalhending, but in the Ragnarsdrápa odd lines frequently have no hending at all, while many even lines merely have a skothending. These rare features are, to a lesser extent, present in Haustlöng, another archaic dróttkvætt poem.

== See also ==
- Ekphrasis

== Notes ==
- Margaret Clunies Ross 2017, ‘Bragi inn gamli Boddason, Ragnarsdrápa’ in Kari Ellen Gade and Edith Marold (eds), Poetry from Treatises on Poetics. Skaldic Poetry of the Scandinavian Middle Ages 3. Turnhout: Brepols, pp. 27–46.
- Myrvoll, K. J., et al. (2016). The constitutive features of the dróttkvætt meter. In K. Árnason (Ed.), Approaches to Nordic and Germanic poetry (pp. 229–256). Institute of Iceland Press.
- Vésteinn Ólason, "Old Icelandic Poetry", in A History of Icelandic Literature, ed. Daisy Neijmann, Histories of Scandinavian Literature 5, The American-Scandinavian Foundation, Lincoln, Nebraska: University of Nebraska, 2006, ISBN 9780803233461, pp. 1–63.
