= Bragi Boddason =

9th-century Norwegian poet, warrior and farmer

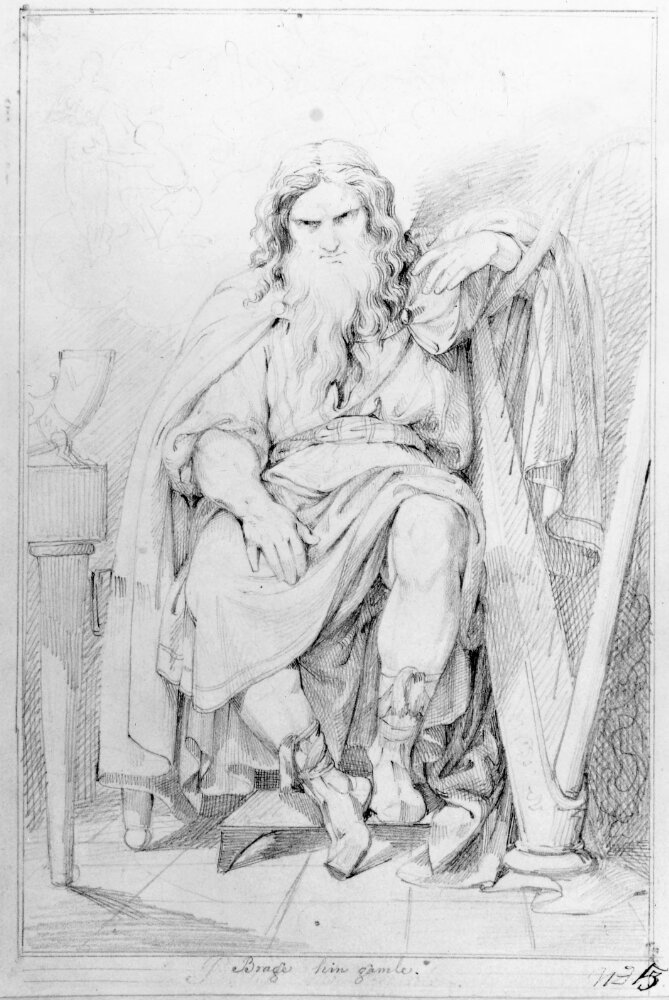
- Drawing of Bragi by Carl Wahlbom
- Occupation: Skald
- Writing career
- Language: Old Norse
- Years active: Early 9th century
- Period: Viking Age
- Notable work: Ragnarsdrápa
- Literary movement: Skaldic poetry

Bragi Boddason, known as Bragi the Old (Old Norse: Bragi hinn gamli) was a Norwegian skald active in the first half of the 9th century, the earliest known skald from whom verses have survived. Portions of his Ragnarsdrápa are preserved in Snorri Sturluson's Edda.

== Life and career ==
Bragi is known as "the Old" to distinguish him from a 12th-century skald, Bragi Hallsson. He was a member of a prominent family in southwestern Norway; according to Landnámabók, he married Lopthœna, the daughter of Erpr lútandi, another skald, and among their descendants was the early 11th-century skald Gunnlaugr ormstunga. Skáldatal lists him as a court poet to three kings, Ragnarr Loðbrók, Eysteinn Beli, and Bjǫrn at haugi, which has led to his life being dated to the 9th century, usually to the first half of that century. However, the dating of the reigns of all but King Bjǫrn in Sweden suggest a later date, and some including Guðbrandur Vigfússon have preferred dates of 835–900. Landnámabók also reports that when visiting Ljúfvina, the wife of king Hjǫrr of Hǫrðaland, he perceived that she had substituted the fair-skinned son of a thrall woman for her dark-skinned twin sons Geirmundr and Hámundr and persuaded her to reinstate her own sons. This story and the story of his confronting a troll-woman, are probably legends.

Bragi has the same name as the god Bragi, which has led some to doubt his historicity, but there are enough mentions of him to attest to his having lived, so that it is likely he was deified and gave his name to the god. He has been credited with inventing the dróttkvætt meter characteristic of skaldic poetry, possibly under the influence of Irish verse forms, but although later skalds imitated some of his kennings, the complexity of his verse makes it more probable that earlier poetry representing the development of the tradition has been lost. On the other hand, conventional features of later dróttkvætt poetry, like hendingar, are still not fully developed in Bragi's poetry.

== Works ==
In Egils saga, ch. 59, Bragi is said to have composed a poem to "ransom his head" after angering King Bjǫrn; Egill Skallagrímsson is persuaded to follow his example by his friend and Bragi's great-grandson Arinbjǫrn, leading him to compose his Hǫfuðlausn for Erik Bloodax.

Most of his verses that we have preserved appear to be part of his Ragnarsdrápa. This is a shield lay, composed in return for the gift of a decorated shield, according to Snorri from Ragnarr Loðbrók, but many scholars consider it more likely the poem was dedicated to a different Ragnarr. It appears to have consisted of an introductory verse followed by four sets of four verses, each describing a scene depicted on the shield: two mythological, Gefjon plowing the island of Zealand out of Sweden and Thor fishing for the World Serpent Jǫrmungandr, and two heroic, Hamðir and Sǫrli's attack on King Jǫrmunrekkr, and the never-ending battle between Heðinn and Hǫgni, and presumably a concluding verse. Parts or all of twenty verses survive; one verse attributed to Bragi in all but one manuscript of the Edda is probably correctly assigned to Úlfr Uggason's Húsdrápa, which also describes a portrayal of Thor's fishing expedition.

== See also ==
- List of skalds
