= Sniolvs kvæði =

Faroese ballad

Sniolvs kvæði (Sniolv's poem) is a Faroese ballad (kvæði) containing 9 subsections (tættir). It was first collected 1781-1782 by Jens Christian Svabo. The longest version consists of 447 verses, making it one of the longest kvæði ever collected.

== History ==
Sniolvs kvæði was first collected 1781-1782, by Jens Christian Svabo. Svabo's collection only consisted of 4 tættir compared to 9 usually attributed to this ballad. Later, another version of Sniolvs kvæði was collected; the collection consisted of 7 tættir. Finally, the two final tættir of Hildardalsstríð (Also known as striðið í Hildardal or Hildars tattur) and Risin á Blálandi were collected under version C by Johannes Clemensen in the Sandoyarbók ballad collection.

While it is unknown whether Sniolvs kvæði is of recent or medieval origin, it has been concluded that some tættir are of later origin. For instance, the 4 tættir in Svabo's original collection are thought to be of older origin as Savbo seemed sure he had collected the entire ballad. It is argued that the 5 other tættir were composed after the collection of the 4 original tættir.

The origin of Sniolvs kvæði is likely from Hildebrandslied and Ásmundar saga kappabana, though other details may have been added once those works reached the Faroes.

== Synopsis ==
=== Rána táttur ===
Rána táttur is most often cited as the first táttur of Sniolvs kvæði. It begins Sniolvs kvæði with Hildibrand asking out Silkieik, the daughter of the king of Uppland. However, the troll Ráni gets Silkieik first and threatened to make Silkieik his concubine. Silkieik, fearing troll Ráni, seaks help from her brother Sniolv. However, Silkieik's father says Sniolvs is too young to fight. Because Sniolvs can not fight, Hildibrand saves Silkieik by slaying troll Ráni. Hildibrand gets married with Silkieik but receives the harbinger that his son, Grímur will die under his sword. The táttur ends with Hildibrand throwing his sword into the sea in an attempt to stop Grímur's fate.

=== Sniolvs táttur ===
Sniolvs táttur (sometimes known as Sniálvs táttur) begins with Silkieik's Brother Sniolvs (referred to as Sniálvur of Uppland) seeking a wife . Sniolvs asks his mother for advice on find a wife. Though Sniolvs is told that there are many fair women in Uppland, none meet Sniolvs' standards. Soon, Adalín, the daughter of Duke of Brunswick, is introduced to Sniolvs. Sniolvs is quite satisfied with the fair Adalín, but he is warned that he isn't enough to win Adalín over. Sniolvs takes the challenge and vows to win Adalín over. Sniolvs builds a fleet of ships from Gold and Silver, sailing to Brunswick to hopefully woo the fair Adalín. However, Sniolvs quickly encounters a threat. Sjúrður, the son of the Duke attempts to fight Sniolvs, but quickly realizes that Sniolvs in unstoppable. The Duke is warned of the unstoppable Sniolvs. The scene cuts to Sniolvs marching into the Duke's Court to demand the Duke's daughter. The Duke initially refuses, but eventually capitulates to Sniolvs' threat of death. When Sniolvs is brought to Adalín, they fall in love at first sight. The couple goes back to uppland and celebrate with gold and riches. However, their love is short lived. A ominous dream alludes to the fate of Sniolvs and Adalín by the sword of Ásmundur, setting the foundation for the next táttur, Golmars táttur

=== Golmars táttur ===
Golmars táttur begins with the Evil Ásmundur going to the Golmar’s house to sleep out of necessity. However, Ásmundur doesn’t thank Golmar, but rather drives Golmar out and rapes Golmar’s Wife Ingibjørg. The next day, Ásmundur takes Golmar boating. He forces Golmar to reveal the location of the sword previously cast into the sea by Hildibrand. Out of fear for his life, Golmar reluctantly agrees to reveal the location of the sword. Ásmundur quickly dives into the water, retrieving the sword. Though the sword was retrieved, Golmar still didn’t escape his fate; Golmar is cleaved in two, his wife now belonging to Ásmundur.

=== Hildibrands táttur ===
Hildibrands táttur is most often considered the next section. Ásmundur brings Golmar’s wife back to his hall. He continues his journey and reaches the regions of Fávanspól and Singjantá. He sees magnificent castle and identifies one belonging to Virgar Sterki. In Virgar’s hall, he meets many beautiful maidens, many of which recognize and praise him for his fight with Torbjørn Bekil. (See ballad detailing events) The maidens claimed to have helped Ásmundur beat Torbjørn. Ásmundur brushes off the praise, redirecting the praise to his mother. The next day, Ásmundur rides to Brunsvík, and sees another castle. This time, the Castle belongs to Hildibrand. Ásmundur decides to fight Hildibrand.Though Hildibrand doesn’t want to fight, Ásmundur is insistent on fighting Hildibrand, evening threatening to behead him. They fight together. Hildibrand cuts the armor off of Ásmundur, defeating him. Ásmundur stands naked, begging for mercy. Ásmundur rides away, humiliated, no long is his title of Ásmundur the champion killer.

=== Virgars táttur ===
Ásmundur starts the táttur off by sending a message to Virgar the Strong, asking him to a duel. Though the maidens in Virgar’s residence predict that Virgar will not survive, Virgar still accepts the duel. The two men ride out and meet each other. Virgar lands a strike, causing Ásmundur to fall of his horse. Virgar now believes Ásmundur is helpless. However, Ásmundur ambushes whilst Virgar is caught off guard, piercing Virgar with a poisonous sword. The poem isn’t entirely clear on whether Virgar dies or not. Ásmundur now feels remorseful of his actions, no longer wanting to return to Virgar’s maidens.

=== Ásmundar táttur ===
Ásmundur táttur picks back up with Ásmundur riding back to Uppland early in the morning. After coming to Uppland, Ásmundur defeats hundreds of Sniolv's men after arriving. Even though Tenkar, Sniolvs' chief man, advises against it, Sniolvs decides to fight with Ásmundur. Ridding out to a green field, the two brave men meet each other head on. Ásmundur reveals his true intentions—to woo the Sniolvs' wife Adalín. Ásmundur recounts the time he forcibly took Golmar's wife, attempting to scare Sniolvs into giving up. Despite this, Sniolvs is unfazed; a fierce battle between the two men breaks out. Eventually, Sniolvs loses and succumbs under the sword of Ásmundur. Ásmundur takes Sniolvs' head as a trophy. After the battle, Ásmundur goes back to the castle where Sniolvs formerly lived. He attempts to woo Sniolvs' wife Adalín. Adalín rejects Ásmundur; rather would Adalín die than to be with anyone other than Sniolvs. Once Adalín found out that Sniolvs had been slain, she noted how Ásmundur likely played dirty to win. Ásmundur forcibly sleeps with Adalín and rides away.
