= Tyler Airport =

Tyler Airport may refer to:

- Tyler Pounds Regional Airport, serving Tyler, Texas
- Tyler Municipal Airport, serving Tyler, Minnesota
- Jerry Tyler Memorial Airport, serving Niles, Michigan
