= Danebod =

- U.S. National Register of Historic Places
- U.S. Historic district
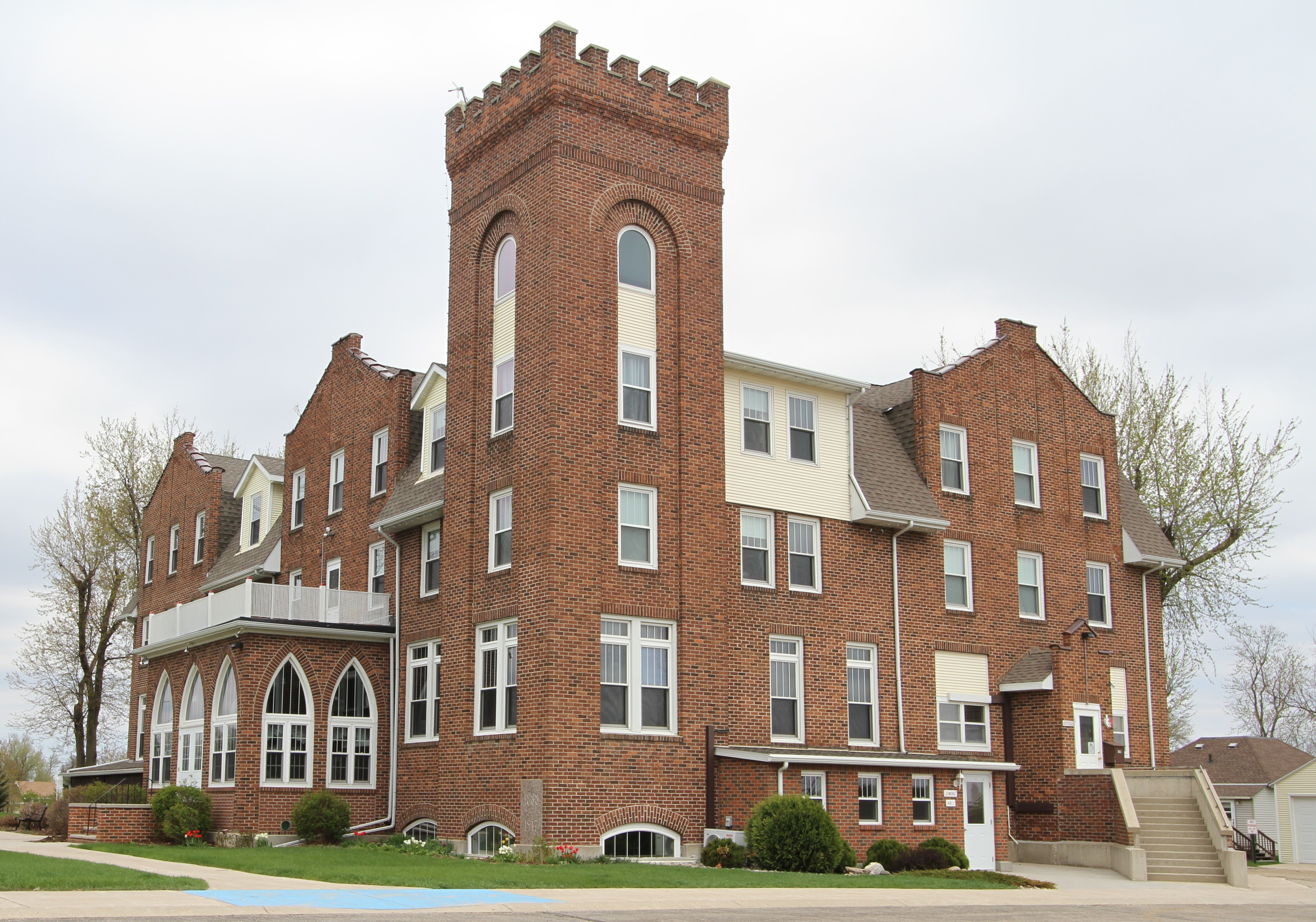
- Danebod Folk School, 2018

- Location within Minnesota Location within the United States
- Location: Danebod Ct., Tyler, Minnesota
- Coordinates: 44°16′05″N 96°08′01″W
- Area: 79 acres (0.32 km^{2})
- Built: 1888
- Architectural style: b
- NRHP reference No.: 75000993
- Added to NRHP: June 30, 1975

Danebod (pronounced "DAHN-a-bo", or "DAN-a-bo") is a historic district at the south edge of the railway town of Tyler in southwestern Minnesota. Founded in 1885 by Danish Evangelical Lutherans led by Rev. Hans Jørgen Pedersen (1851–1905), the district comprises a group of buildings dating back to 1888 from Minnesota's oldest Danish immigrant settlement. Danebod remains until this day a predominantly Danish Lutheran, close-knit religious community. An annual celebration named Æbleskiver Days, held on the fourth weekend of July, celebrates Danish heritage and culture and includes a parade that goes down the town's main street with floats that are made by the various Danebod neighborhoods.

On the basis of its cultural and architectural significance, four buildings from Danebod were added to the U.S. National Register of Historic Places on June 30, 1975 as the "Danebod Historic Complex".

== Etymology ==
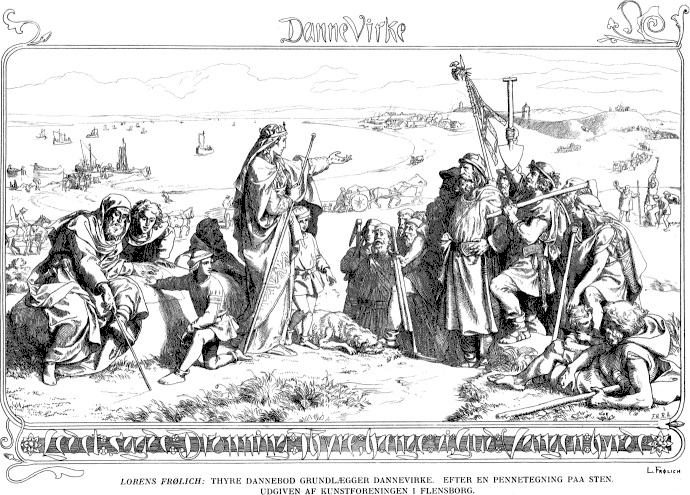
The area was named Danebod in honor of Queen Thyra Danebod of Denmark.

The name "Danebod" honors Denmark's first queen, Queen Thyra Danebod, the consort of tenth-century Danish king Gorm the Old. Queen Thyra is recorded in medieval accounts to have directed the building of the Danevirke, a defensive earthwork across Jutland as protection against foes to the south. Due to her importance and good policies, she was given the name Danebod, which can be variously translated as "one who mends, comforts, or saves the Danes".

== History ==
The native inhabitants of the area which later became Danebod were the Dakota Sioux people.

=== Establishment ===
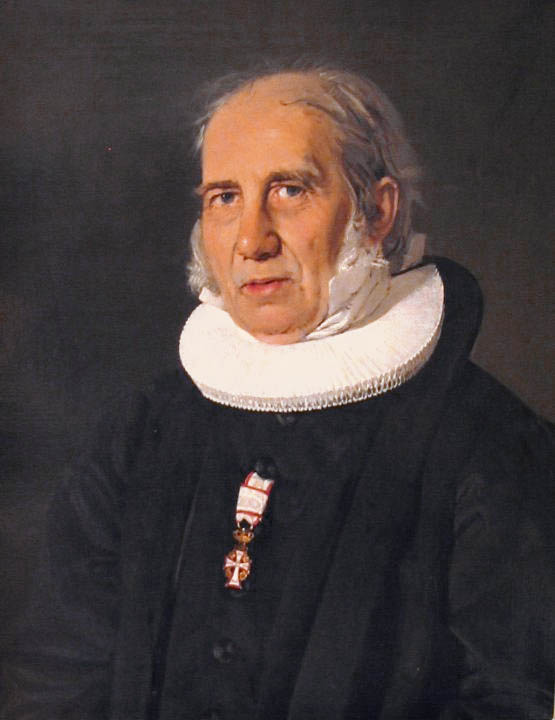
Danebod was established by Grundtvigians, followers of Nikolaj Frederik Severin Grundtvig (1783–1872).

On September 8, 1872, two Danish pioneer pastors, Adam Dan and Rasmus Andersen, established a small organization in Neenah, Wisconsin, which later became the Danish Evangelical Lutheran Church in America. At one of the churches' conventions in Clinton, Iowa, in 1884, the Danish farmer Rasmus Hansen of Elk Horn, Iowa, suggested that "the Danish Church should help all the families living around in cities, who would prefer living in the countryside, where they could find a fitting spot for a Danish colony." A committee was appointed for the purpose of finding a piece of land for the scattered Danish immigrants to settle. The committee consisted of the Grundtvigian Evangelical-Lutheran pastors F. L. Grundtvig (the son of N. F. S. Grundtvig), Kristian Anker, Rasmus Hansen, Jens C. Kjær, and C. Bruhn. This committee soon made arrangements with Winona and the St. Peter Railroad Company to purchase 35,000 acres (140 km^{2}) of land in the southeastern part of Lincoln County, Minnesota. An agreement with the land agent, A. Bojsen, stipulated that for three years this land was to be sold only to Danish people. The land was rolling prairie by the hills of Buffalo Ridge, just south of the community of Tyler, Minnesota. By June 27, 1885, seventy settlers from various states, towns, and communities had made the area their home.

The pioneer settlers were all Grundtvigians; a faction within the Danish National Church. The Grundtvigians represented a nationalistic and liberal religious tradition, in staunch contrast to pietists and fundamentalists in the Church Association for the Inner Mission in Denmark. Grundtvigians believed in celebrating life, but they lived for the present, and were often nicknamed "Happy Danes". While salvation was the gift of Christianity, being saved was not a focus. The Bible was the Holy Book, but was not to be taken literally, and the Apostles' Creed rather than the Bible was their source of Christianity. Grundtvigians were also nationalists who wanted to "rewaken the Danes in appreciation of their identity", and its founder, Nikolaj Frederik Severin Grundtvig, is quoted for his writing: "first a Dane and then a Christian" in 1848. The Grundtvigians stressed four elects of a "true people": a common land, a common language, a common history and forefathers, and common culture through songs, folk dancing, language, cuisine, etc. Grundtvigians established Danebod to "save the Danes from total Americanization", and the colony's only written and spoken language remained Danish for several decades after its establishment. On Sunday, June 28, 1885, the pioneers arranged a festival to celebrate the new colony. The population grew rapidly in the early 1890s, and by the year 1895, 222 people lived in the Danish Colony of Danebod.

=== Late 19th century ===
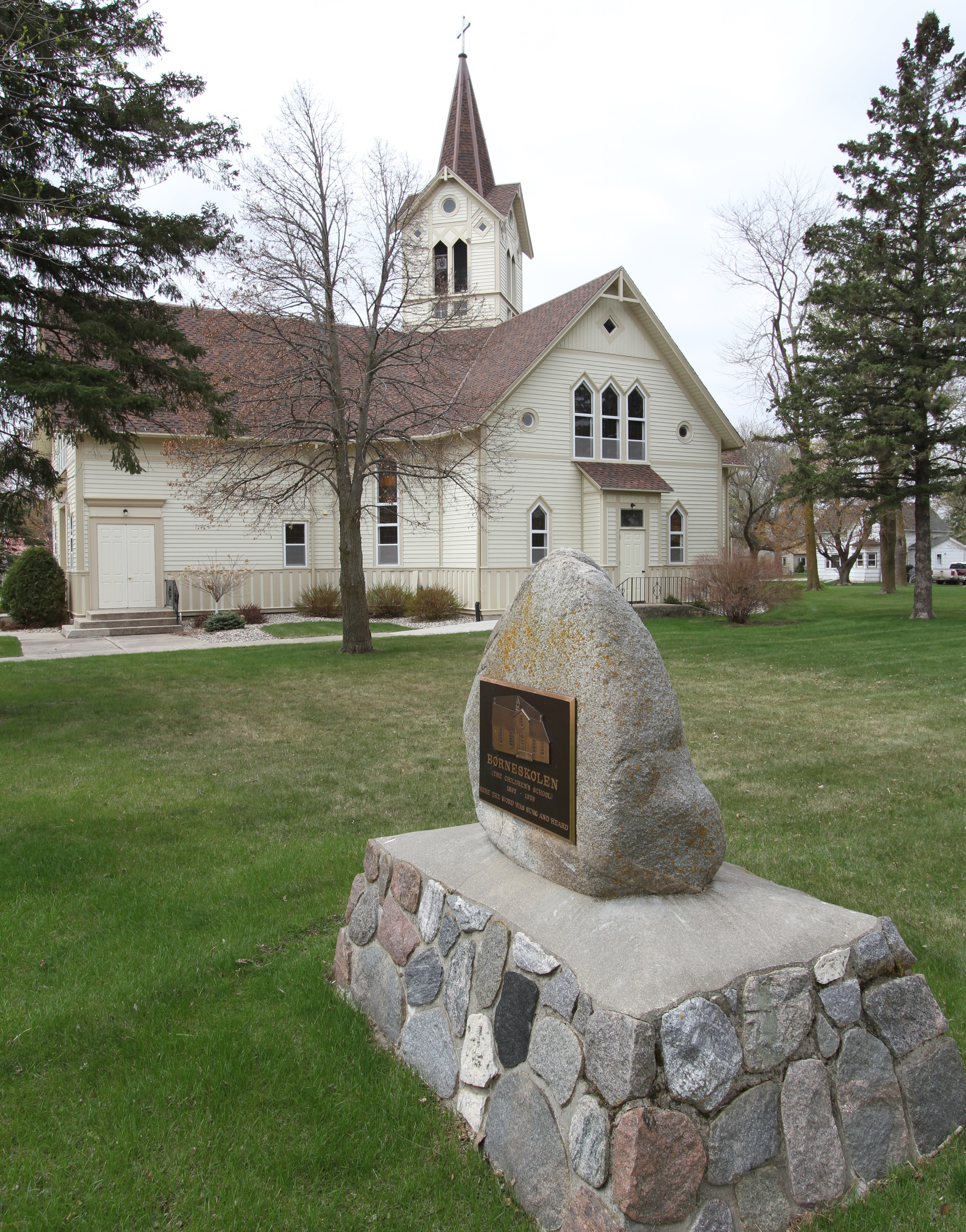
Monument to "Borneskolen" residential school, founded by early settlers of the colony in the Danish tradition of folk high schools, fostering the concept of learning for living.

On July 11, 1886, a meeting was held at the home of P. N. Clausen at which the Danebod congregation was formally organized with fifteen members. The church council consisted of its president, P. N. Clausen, secretary M. Lauritsen, and treasurer Jørgen Jacobsen. At first there were no regular church services and no resident pastor. Instead, the people met in various homes to sing Danish hymns and listen to a reading of the sermon by a layman. The pastor of Sleepy Eye, Minnesota, S. C. Madsen, and other ministers occasionally conducted services in town. The congregation later hired the Danish settler, pastor Hans Jørgen Pedersen (1851–1905) of Gowen, Michigan. He arrived with his family on April 12, 1888. Pedersen had a humble upbringing in Denmark, where he later studied at Ryslinge Folk High School before emigrating to America in 1875. He was an eloquent preacher, resourceful, and became involved in community activities throughout the area. He quickly assumed leadership and thus, in a sense, became the founder of Danebod. One of the pastor's six children, Sigurd Pedersen, described their first arrival in Danebod in his autobiography: "It was a chilly morning, when the committee stood on the platform to bid welcome to the new pastor and his wife, trailed by six children, and the rear held up by the trusty hired man, Søren Olsen, who was to keep count of the straying flock and see that the last luggage was not forgotten. Friends invited us over for breakfast in the home of H. J. Nelsen, the merchant. Then the committee guided us to a small house on the corner just west of the present-day Chevrolet dealer, where businessman Carl Cold Sorensen brought the first automobiles to the area in the early 1900s. The committee had left no kindling in this small house, but Søren Olsen soon discovered that the kitchen range was in place and claimed to be able to manipulate the same if kindling could be provided. Across the street was a large general store, and father sent us there to beg Mr. Lauritsen for some kindling. We were given old boxes to break up, and we soon had our arms full and Søren had a blazing fire in a few minutes." In September 1888, it was decided at a convention in Elk Horn, Iowa, to give the congregation at Danebod 77 acres (0.31 km^{2}) of land, and the Danebod Lutheran Church was dedicated on Sunday, June 16, 1895. Pedersen died in 1905, and the Reverend Thorvald Knudsen succeeded him at Danebod.

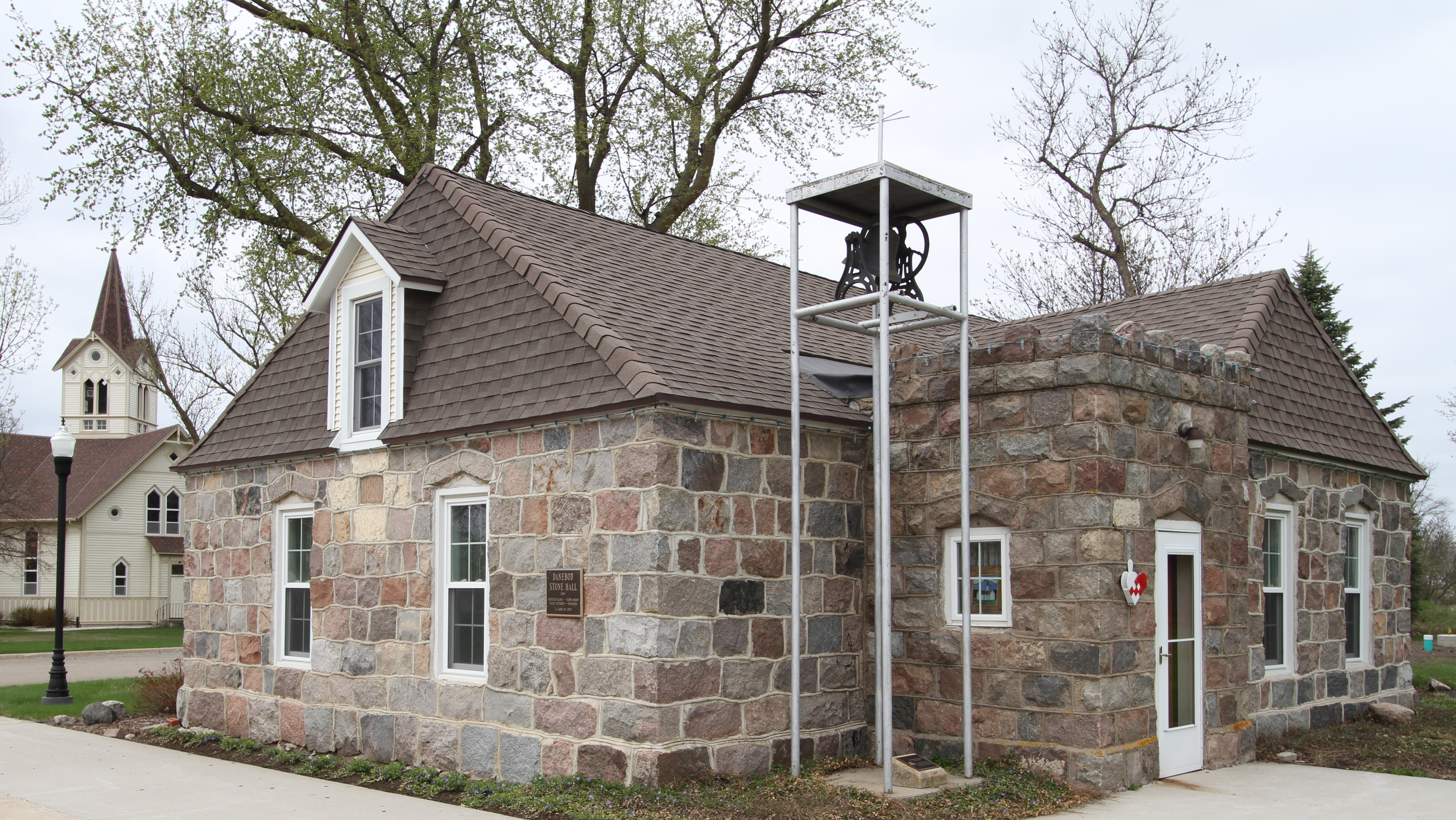
Danebod Stone Hall was built in 1889 from native field rock hauled in by farmers and split and shaped by Danish stonemason Kristian Klink.

Pastor H. J. Pedersen, like most early pastors in the synod, had received his training in a folk school, and he was convinced that the success of the new congregation and colony depended on the establishment of such a Danish-speaking folk school. Danebod Folk School opened December 1, 1888, with Pedersen as president. Other teachers were Carl Hansen and Christian Hansen. Among the first students were Niels Petersen and Kristian Klink, both Danish immigrants. Klink was a stonemason educated in Denmark, and he helped pastor Pedersen in building the Stone Hall. It was built of native rock. Farmers hauled rocks from the shores of Swan Lake just south of Danebod, and Klink and his helpers split and shaped the rocks. The Stone Hall was finished in the fall of 1889, and the first public gathering in the Stone Hall was at Klink's funeral in November 1889. The Stone Hall quickly became the center of the new colony, and Sunday services were conducted here, as well as numerous weddings, baptisms and funerals. The students at the Danebod Folk School used the building as a gym hall, and young people would meet here to socialize, meet up with friends, and participate in singing games. Three years later, the Stone Hall was now too small for worship services. It was decided to build a new church, and the Cross Church at Danebod was dedicated on Sunday, June 16, 1895.

=== Early 20th century ===
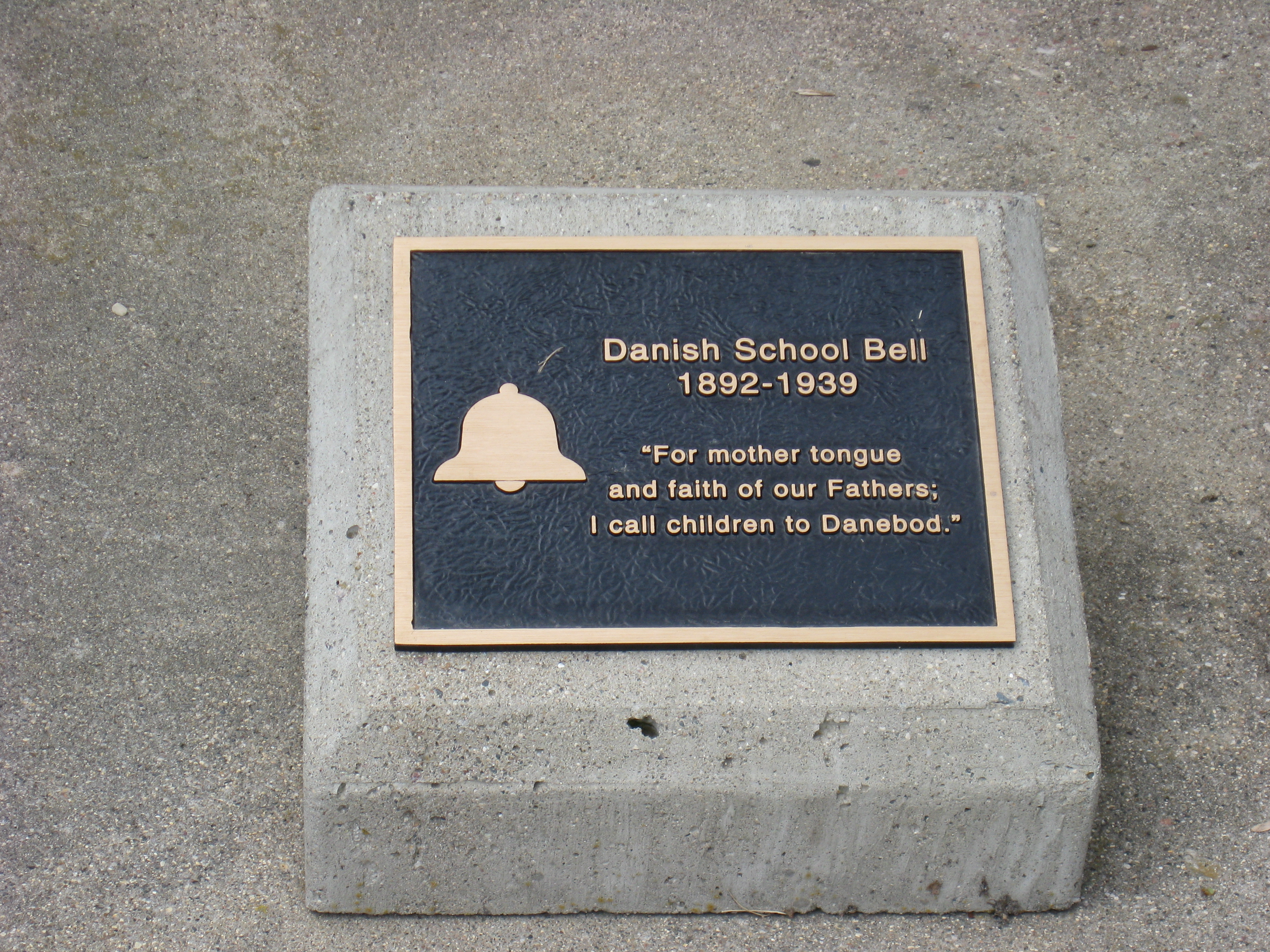
In the fall of 1898, a committee was elected to gather money for purchasing a church bell. The bell was hung two years later, and it rang for the first time on Sunday, November 25, 1900.

A Ladies' Aid society was established on July 15, 1903, with board members Marie Hovgaard, Anna P. C. Petersen, Henrietta Hansen, and Sine C. Jensen. At first, Sunday school was conducted an hour prior to the church services on Sunday, but in 1907 it was decided to hold Sunday school during the time of worship service. As early as 1904, the synod had discussed the possibility of establishing a children's home at Tyler. On November 1, 1906, a children's home opened in the residence of K. H. Duus, who temporarily moved to Askov, Minnesota. A Folk School Association was organized in 1912. As early as 1888, the colony organized its first Danish elementary school for its children, Børneskolen, which was in use until 1939. In her travel diary entitled My Big Adventure of 1915–1916: The joys and hazards of motor touring in 1915, Danebod local Ragna C. Olson (1905–2007) described the average school day in 1914: "We had an hour of religion, then learned how to read and write Danish, some history, and the last hour we girls learned work such as knitting, crocheting and embroidery. In the afternoons, they taught us English, writing, reading and arithmetic." Ragna Olsen (previously Sorensen) was the daughter of the Danish pioneers Johanne Marie Sorensen (1877–1947) and Carl Cold Sorensen (1879–1967), both of whom hold a place in Danebod history for bringing the first motorized vehicles to Tyler in the early 1900s.

On Sunday, February 25, 1917, Danebod Folk School burned to the ground. Fortunately, the fire burned slowly. The students and the quickly summoned neighbors had time to rescue much of the furniture and other items of high value. Nearby buildings were saved, but the Folk School was beyond rescue. In the fall of 1917, nine months after the disastrous fire, a new and larger Folk School was dedicated. Speakers at the dedicatory exercises were Pastor Knudsen, C. P. Højbjerg, Aage Møller, P. Rasmussen, and Kristian Østergaard. Meanwhile, a terrible epidemic of influenza swept the county, and all churches and schools were temporarily closed in an effort to halt the deadly disease; but many people died. Another catastrophe followed on August 21, 1918, when a devastating tornado tore through Lincoln County. It was the fourth most deadly tornado in Minnesota history and took the lives of 36 people and injured a dozen more.

== Culture ==
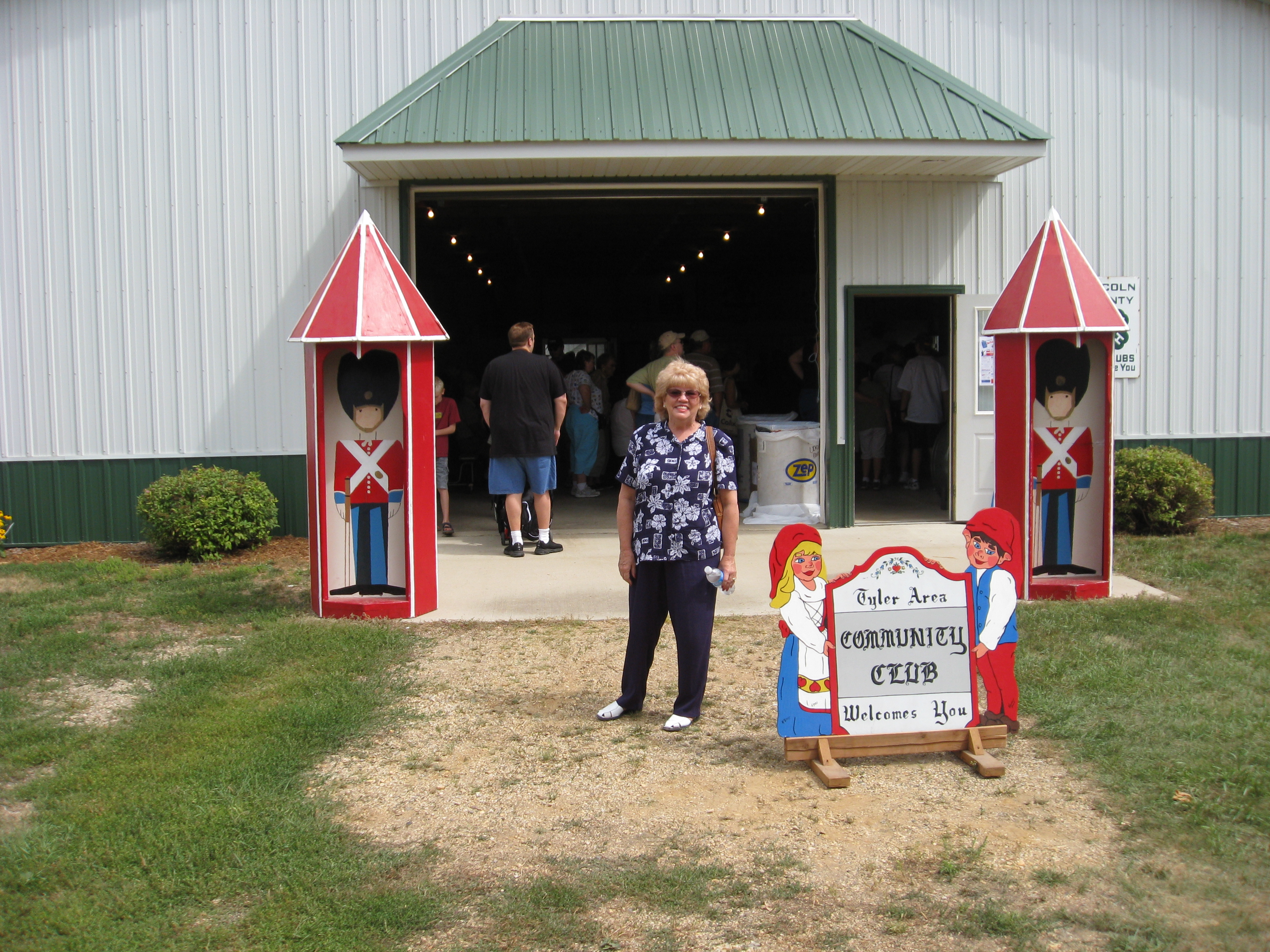
Danebod Community Center during Æbleskiver Days, 2007

Danebod has continued to be a haven for Danish culture through the 20th century and into the 21st. The elementary school, university, library, newspapers, and church services remained Danish language for decades (and remained the most widely spoken language until the 1940s). Danebod remains a predominantly Danish-American town. It is customary to fly the Danish flag, Dannebrog, and Danish cuisine, music, cultural celebrations, language, literature, and the Evangelical Lutheran religious tradition remain important parts of life for the more than 200 inhabitants. Until 1947 church services were held solely in the Danish language, but has since offered one weekly service in Danish. Danebod is sometimes referred to as "the home of the Nissemænd," a reference to the mythological tomte of folklore. There is a sign on Tyler Street saying: "Welcome to Tyler. Home of the Nissemaend".

During the 1930s, a combination of financial pressure and low enrollment forced the Danish-language based Danebod Folk School to close down. The building was re-opened in 1946 and has since 1947 offered annual summer family camps. Danebod Folk Camp offers Danish cuisine, Danish folk dance, Danish art, and other Danish cultural experiences. In the spirit of the Danish Folk School system, camp attendees sing Danish songs, dance traditional Danish folk dance, work on crafts and have Danish-based lectures throughout the day.

There are several annual Danish-inspired celebrations in town, including the town parade, Grundlovsdag (Danish Constitution Day), Fastelavn, and Æbleskiver Days. Æbleskiver are traditional Danish pancakes in a distinctive spherical shape. Æbleskiver Days is one of the town's top attractions, and has been held annually by Danish descendants for more than a hundred years. During this two-day festival held on the 4th weekend of every July, Danebod celebrates its Danish heritage and community. During this festival, there is a parade inspired by Danish traditions and culture that goes down Main Street with floats made by the various neighborhoods. Traditional Danish foods such as medisterpølse, frikadeller, rabarbergrød, rødkål, cream wafers, cinnamon sticks, rosettes, kisses, as well as æbleskiver, smørrebrød, Danish coffee, liver-pâté, and sweets are also popular during the festival. Other activities during Æbleskiver Days include traditional Danish folk dancing, Danish art displays, Danish folk song singing, children's activities, and the fairground fair called Tivoli The Scandinavian tradition of singing and dancing around the Christmas tree still takes place at the center of the Gym Hall during Christmas time. Some families keep up the tradition of celebrating Christmas Eve on December 24. There is a town fair on the Danish Constitution Day, June 5. There are still quite a few Danish speakers, especially among the elders.

== Danebod Historic Complex ==
Recognized for its architectural and cultural significance, the Danebod Historic Complex, at 101 Danebod Court, was listed on the U.S. National Register of Historic Places on June 30, 1975. The complex includes four historic buildings: the Folk School (built in 1888, rebuilt in 1917), Stone Hall (1889), Cross Church or Danebod Lutheran Church (1893), and Gym Hall (1904). Most of these buildings survived the disastrous fire of 1917, except for the Folk School, which burned down and was rebuilt the same year. These buildings also stood through the devastating 1918 tornado, which killed 36 people in the community.

All four structures were built in a simplified Greek Cross floor plan to signify a religious purpose. Closest to Lake Danebod stands the Folk High School, a three-story wooden building with eight gables. Next to the Folk High School stands the multipurpose Stone Hall, and across the street stands the Gym Hall with its iconic twin towers. Danebod Lutheran Church is located on the town's main street, appropriately named Tyler Street, and is in the shape of a Greek cross on the outside.

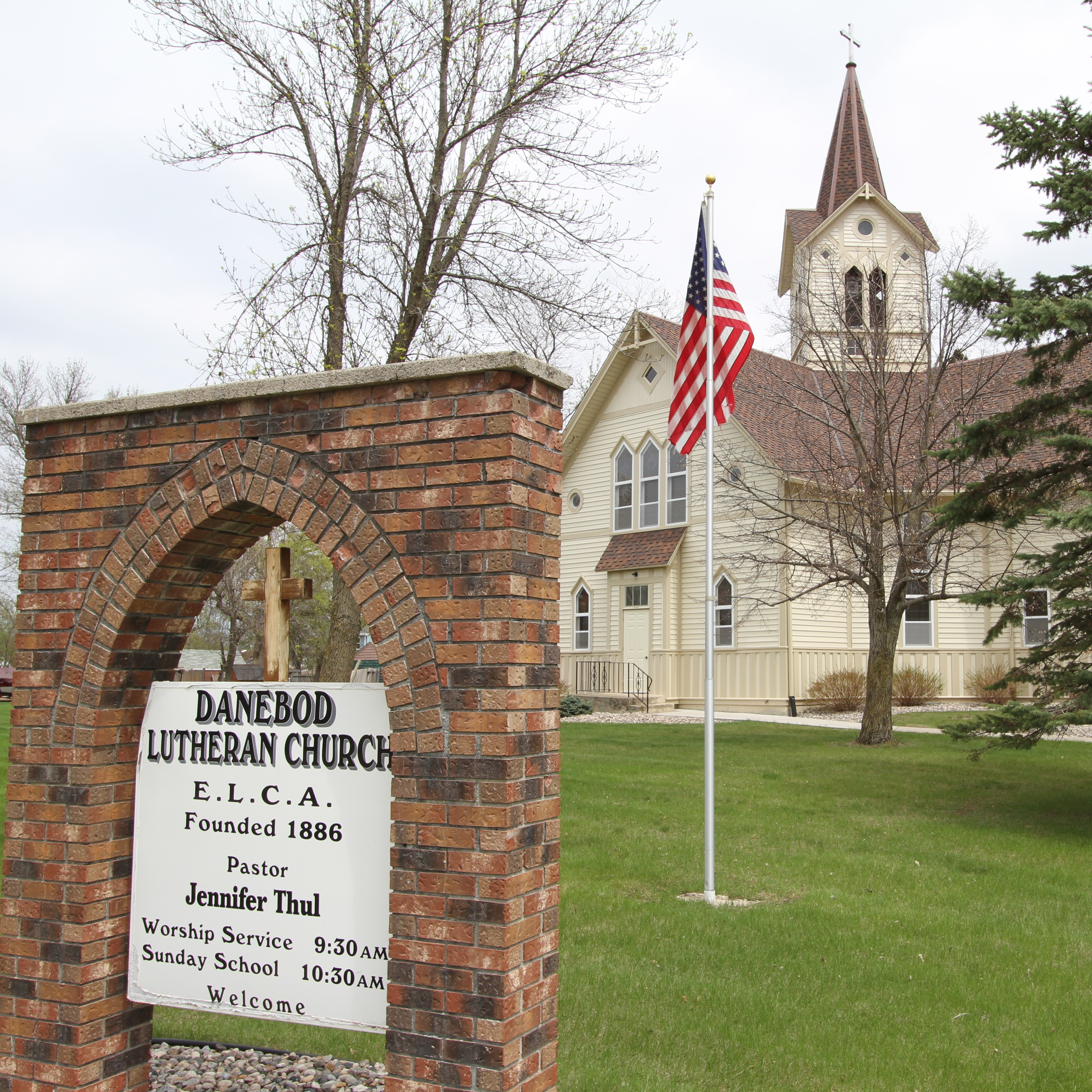
Danebod Lutheran Church in 2018

The Danebod Lutheran Church (also known as the Cross Church at Danebod) was dedicated Sunday, June 16, 1895. It is a cruciform clapboard building with a square placed obliquely in the center. The tower in the middle is carried at a 45 degree angle to the arms of the cross. The outside and interior detailing of the church is Eastlake. It was built largely with volunteer labor and money pledged by the early settlers, who had little to give. Points of interest include the altar chairs, kerosene lamps, architectural structure, wainscoting walls and ceiling, porthole windows as in a ship, hand-carving on the altar, pulpit and railing, the candelabra and altar cloth, hand-carved stone baptismal font, the Star of Bethlehem in the ceiling, Bertel Thorvaldsen's statue of Christ, the Celtic cross, and pictures in the narthex. The church is located at 101 Danebod Court. The church was established by the organization that later became the Danish Evangelical Lutheran Church in America (DELCA). This organization later merged into the Lutheran Church in America (LCA) in 1962 and then into the largest Lutheran church in the U.S. in 1988: the Evangelical Lutheran Church in America (ELCA). Danebod Lutheran Church remains a part of the ELCA still today.

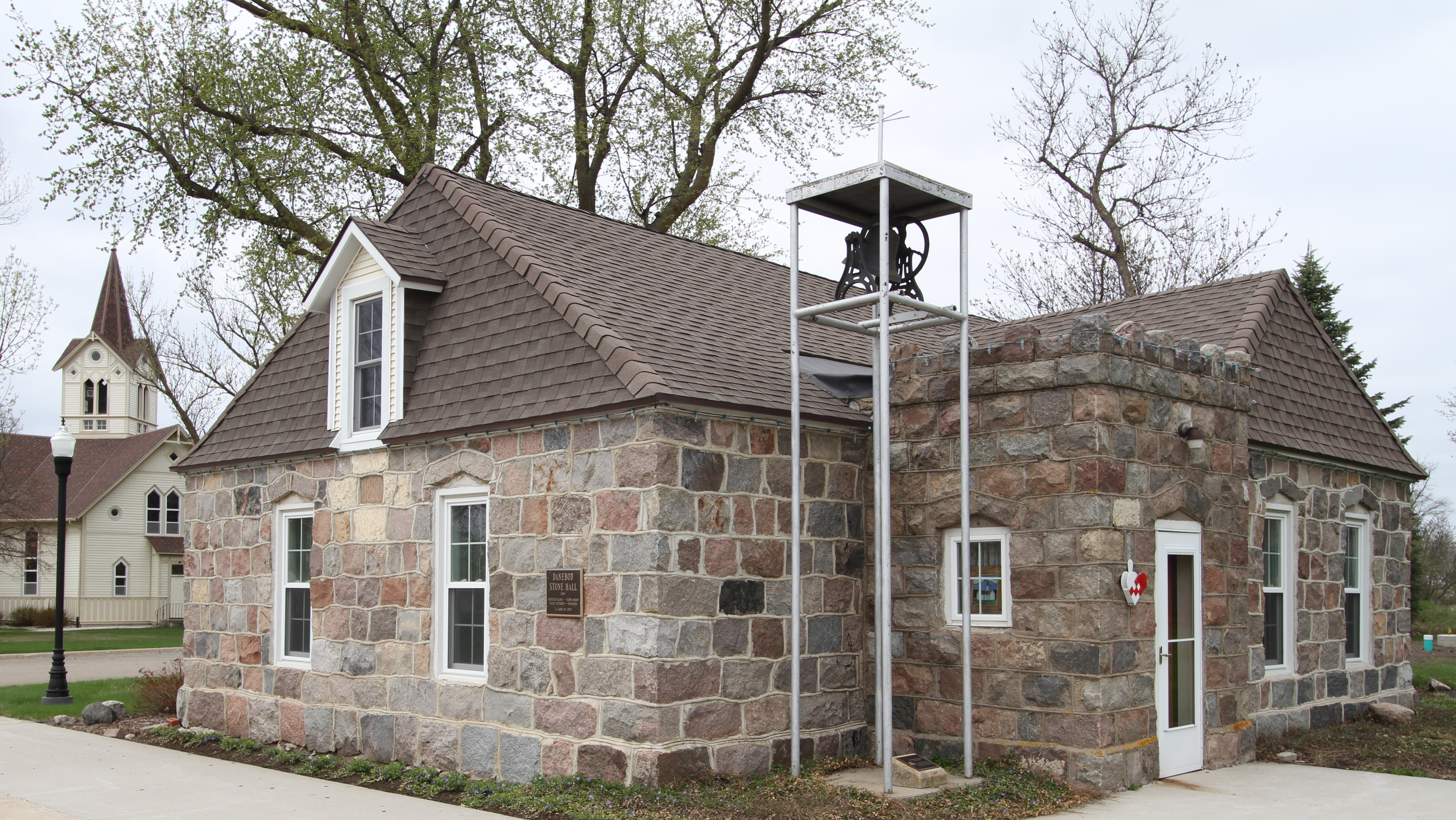
The Danebod Stone Hall

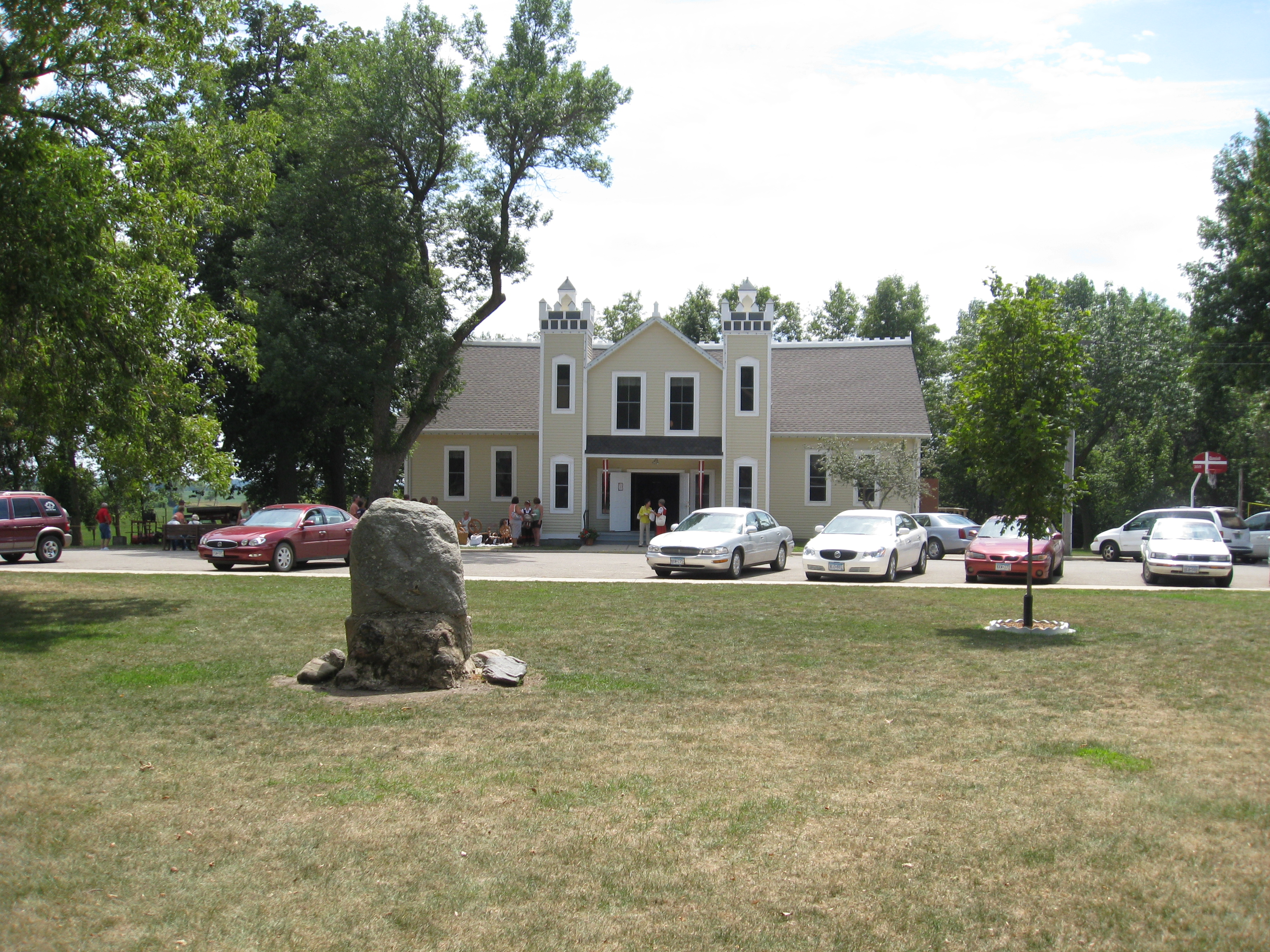
The Gym Hall

The Danebod Stone Hall was built in 1889 and is a single-floor stone building in the form of a Latin cross. Its entrance wing features medieval-inspired crenellations, but the rest of the building with its pedimented windows are closer to being Greek Revival. It was built from native field rock hauled in by farmers and split and shaped by a Danish stonemason named Kristian Klink. The Stone Hall was used as the first church, later as a gymnasium and assembly hall. Points of interest are the outdoor old bell from the former children's school, fresco from the Gym Hall, the old chandelier from the Cross Church, old photographs, and handcut field stone in the structure. The Stone Hall is now a museum housing a collection of photographs, publications and objects important in Danebod history. It is also a venue for activities, lectures and discussion groups, and is typically open for public viewing during the Danebod Family Camp sessions.

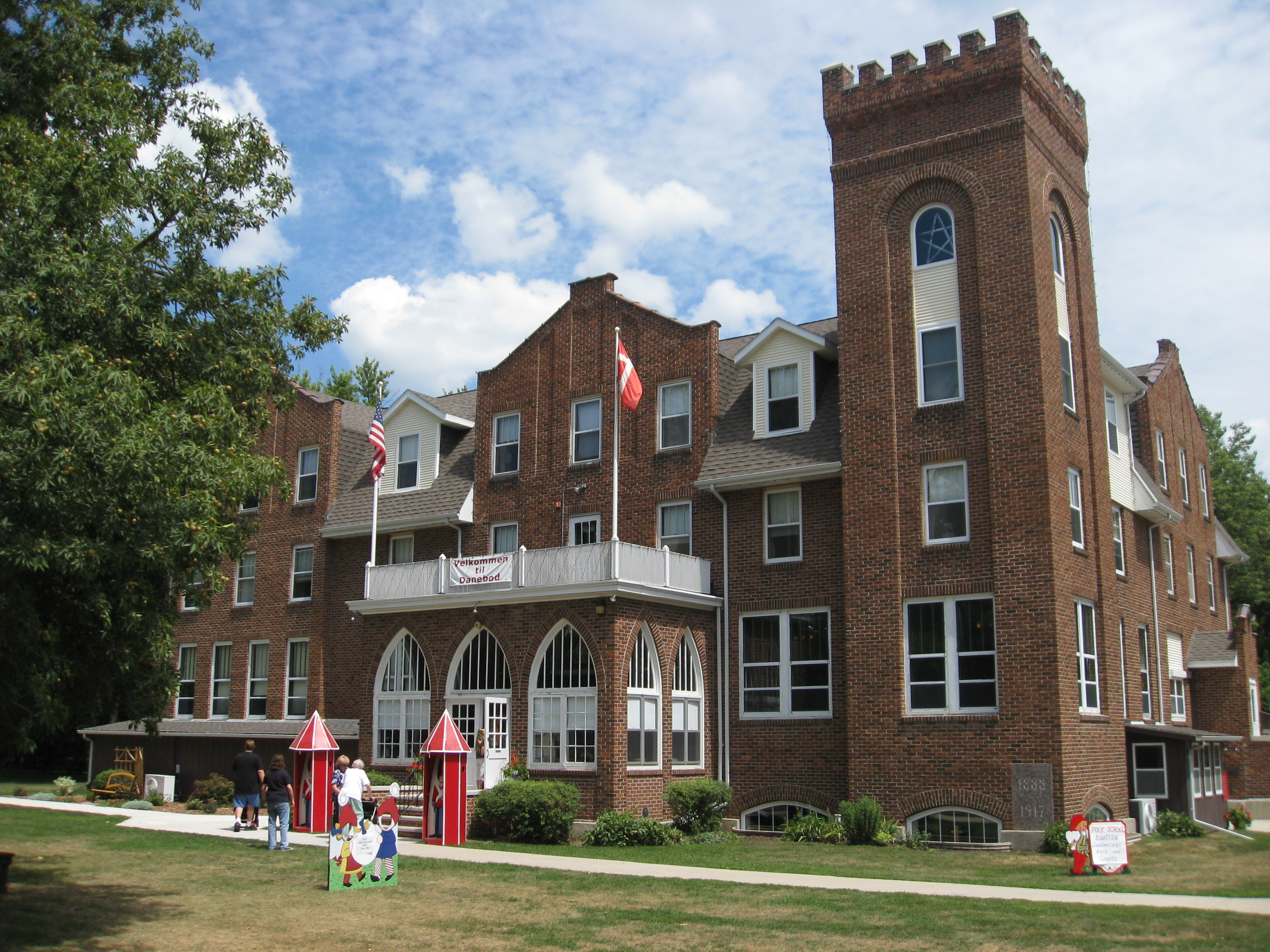
The Danebod Folk School

The Danebod Gym Hall was erected in 1904 and is a cruciform clapboard building. The two sides of the entrance arm project forward to the eaves, and the sides plus a small roof enclose the entrance. It was originally built as a space for Danish gymnastics, folk dancing, music, theatrical performances, larger social gatherings, and worship for the Folk School students and other locals. Every year in the Gym Hall, the Danebod Lutheran Church upholds the Danish tradition of dancing around the Christmas tree. The basement is also commonly used for crafts such as stained glass and woodworking. In 1928 it was enlarged with a stage, basement and furnace. Many home talent plays were presented there, and it is still used for an occasional play, and is also used by the camps and retreats for folk dancing. Points of interest are the statue with an original canvas curtain with advertising, bars used years ago by gymnasts (on the south wall), and the original wainscoting on the walls.

The Danebod Folk School was first built in the year 1888, but it burned to the ground on February 25, 1917. It was soon rebuilt, and nine months later the current school building was completed. A three-story brick building, it has gable ends carried up as parapets. The four-story crenelated corner tower and the pointed arches at the entrance are from Gothic and native Danish architecture. The Folk School was renovated in 1946 and is now used by the Danebod Lutheran Church for camps and retreats, and as a meeting place for local groups and clubs. Points of interest are the hand-carved podium in the lecture hall, the picture behind the podium, the hand-carved wooden cross on the podium, collection plates made by Dr. Thomsen, and also the statuary in the lecture hall and sitting rooms, pictures in the sitting rooms, and the small podium in the dining room. Early settlers of the colony founded a residential school in the Danish tradition of folk High Schools and fostered the concept of "learning for living", by which individuals sought to become enlightened and thoughtful citizens. Each dormitory style room is unique in plan and decoration. A large kitchen and dining area provide a perfect setting for group meals and activities. A lecture hall and several classrooms allow ample space for programming.
