= Bertha Lee Hansen =

American politician

Bertha Lee Hansen (July 18, 1882 – January 20, 1966) was an American politician.

Hansen was born in Indiana and went to the College of Oratory in Marion, Indiana. She was involved with philanthropy and the Women Federation of Clubs. Hansen lived in Tyler, Minnesota with her husband Senus M. Hansen. She served in the Minnesota House of Representatives in 1939 and 1940.
