= Tyler, Minnesota =

City in Minnesota, United States

- City
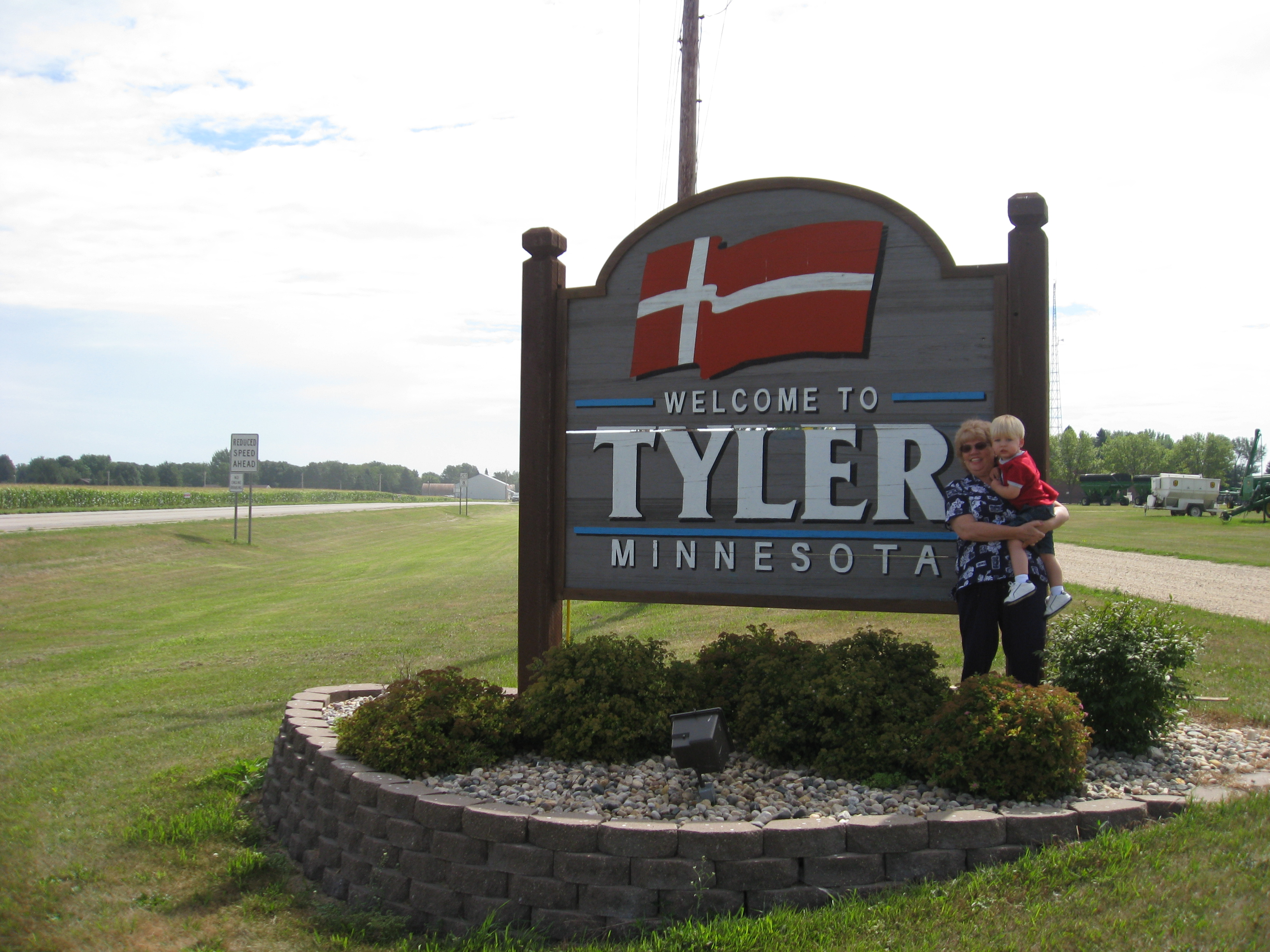
- Motto: "Minnesota's Danish Heartland"
- Location of Tyler within Lincoln County, Minnesota
- Coordinates: 44°16′33″N 96°08′09″W
- Country: United States
- State: Minnesota
- County: Lincoln

Government
  - Type: Mayor – Council
  - Mayor: Joan Jagt

Area
  - Total: 2.14 sq mi (5.55 km^{2})
  - Land: 2.10 sq mi (5.44 km^{2})
  - Water: 0.042 sq mi (0.11 km^{2})
- Elevation: 1,742 ft (531 m)

Population (2020)
  - Total: 1,138
  - Density: 541.7/sq mi (209.14/km^{2})
- Time zone: UTC-6 (Central (CST))
  - Summer (DST): UTC-5 (CDT)
- ZIP code: 56178
- Area code: 507
- FIPS code: 27-66046
- GNIS feature ID: 2397075
- Website: tylermn.gov

Tyler is a city in Lincoln County, Minnesota, United States. The population of Tyler was 1,138 at the 2020 census.

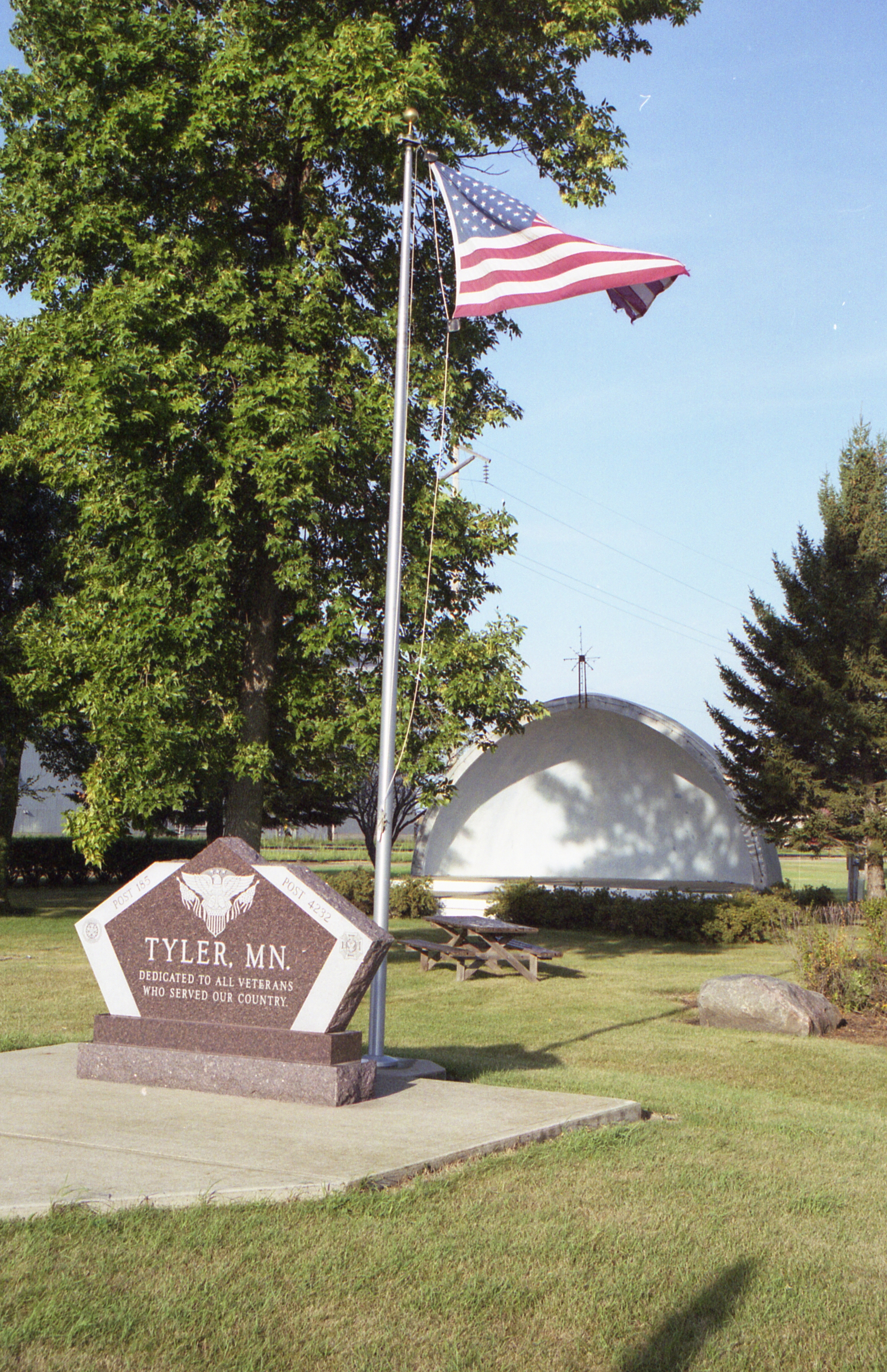
The memorial to all veterans in Tyler

== History ==
Tyler was platted in 1879. It was named for C. B. Tyler, a Minnesota land agent and newspaper editor. A post office has been in operation in Tyler since 1879.

Tyler's Danebod district was originally built up chiefly by Danish settlers and is now listed on the U.S. National Register of Historic Places.

== Geography ==
According to the United States Census Bureau, the city has a total area of 2.01 square miles (5.21 km^{2}), of which 1.97 square miles (5.10 km^{2}) is land and 0.04 square miles (0.10 km^{2}) is water.

U.S. Highway 14 serves as a main route in the community.

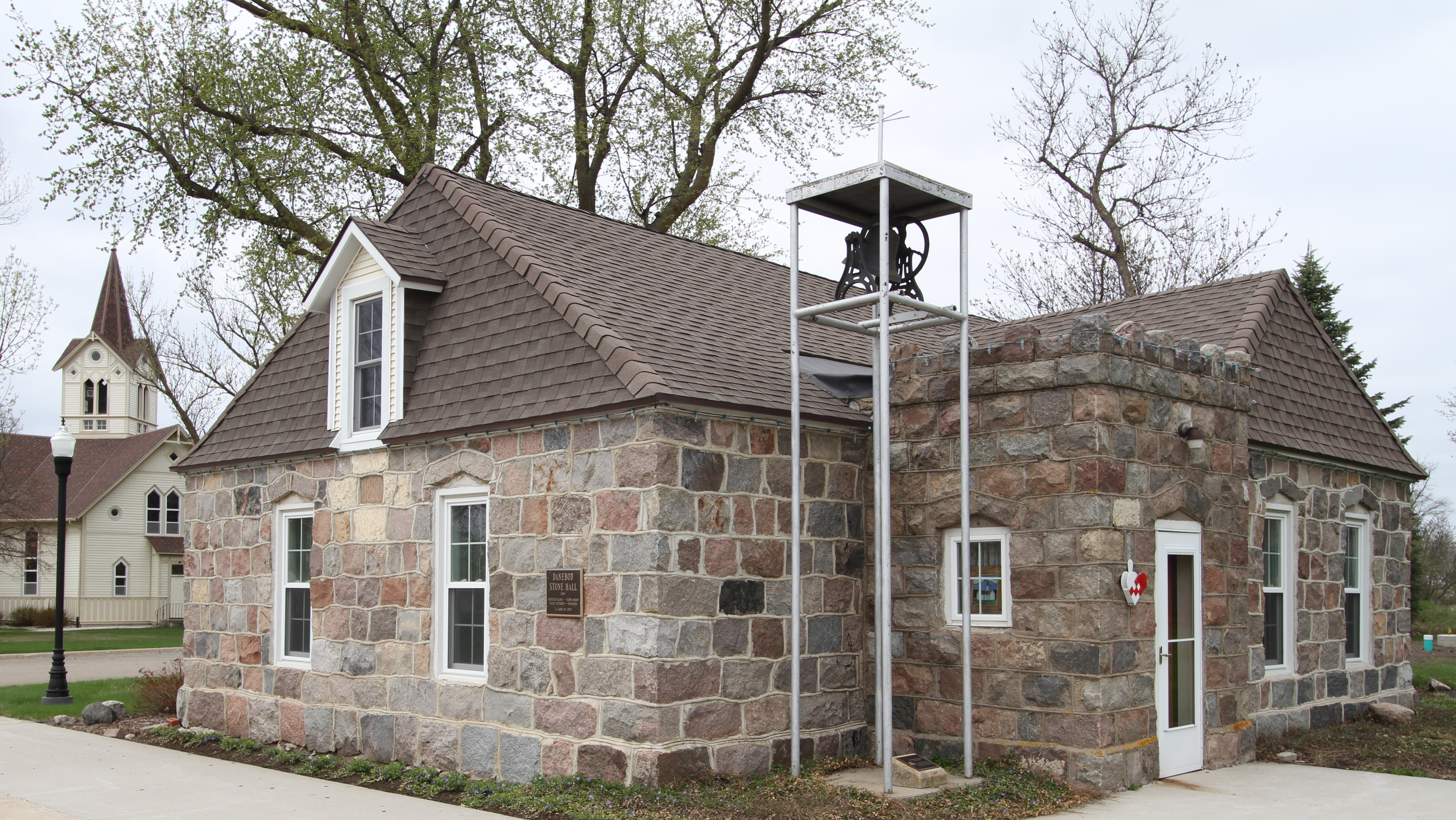
The stone hall church, the first building built in the Danebod historic district.

At the southern end of the town lies the Danebod historic district, with many of its buildings listed on the National Register of Historic Places. This area consists of the campus of the Danebod Lutheran Church.

== Demographics ==
Historical population
Census	Pop.	Note	%±
1880	81		—
1890	137		69.1%
1900	515		275.9%
1910	614		19.2%
1920	858		39.7%
1930	905		5.5%
1940	1,005		11.0%
1950	1,121		11.5%
1960	1,138		1.5%
1970	1,069		−6.1%
1980	1,353		26.6%
1990	1,257		−7.1%
2000	1,218		−3.1%
2010	1,143		−6.2%
2020	1,138		−0.4%
U.S. Decennial Census

=== 2010 census ===
As of the census of 2010, there were 1,143 people, 520 households, and 292 families living in the city. The population density was 580.2 inhabitants per square mile (224.0/km^{2}). There were 583 housing units at an average density of 295.9 per square mile (114.2/km^{2}). The racial makeup of the city was 96.9% White, 0.3% African American, 0.3% Native American, 0.2% Asian, 1.0% from other races, and 1.2% from two or more races. Hispanic or Latino of any race were 2.4% of the population.

There were 520 households, of which 23.1% had children under the age of 18 living with them, 46.7% were married couples living together, 7.7% had a female householder with no husband present, 1.7% had a male householder with no wife present, and 43.8% were non-families. 40.8% of all households were made up of individuals, and 21.4% had someone living alone who was 65 years of age or older. The average household size was 2.10 and the average family size was 2.85.

The median age in the city was 46.1 years. 21.9% of residents were under the age of 18; 5.2% were between the ages of 18 and 24; 22% were from 25 to 44; 24.5% were from 45 to 64; and 26.3% were 65 years of age or older. The gender makeup of the city was 48.1% male and 51.9% female.

=== 2000 census ===
As of the census of 2000, there were 1,218 people, 532 households, and 338 families living in the city. The population density was 632.8 inhabitants per square mile (244.3/km^{2}). There were 577 housing units at an average density of 299.8 per square mile (115.8/km^{2}). The racial makeup of the city was 97.78% White, 0.49% Native American, 0.49% Asian, 1.23% from other races. Hispanic or Latino of any race were 2.87% of the population.

There were 532 households, out of which 24.2% had children under the age of 18 living with them, 56.0% were married couples living together, 6.4% had a female householder with no husband present, and 36.3% were non-families. 33.6% of all households were made up of individuals, and 18.4% had someone living alone who was 65 years of age or older. The average household size was 2.20 and the average family size was 2.81.

In the city, the population was spread out, with 21.3% under the age of 18, 7.2% from 18 to 24, 21.6% from 25 to 44, 22.2% from 45 to 64, and 27.7% who were 65 years of age or older. The median age was 45 years. For every 100 females, there were 88.3 males. For every 100 females age 18 and over, there were 84.2 males.

The median income for a household in the city was $31,196, and the median income for a family was $37,841. Males had a median income of $30,592 versus $17,981 for females. The per capita income for the city was $17,451. About 3.8% of families and 6.1% of the population were below the poverty line, including 5.0% of those under age 18 and 14.0% of those age 65 or over.

== Tornado ==
On August 21, 1918, 36 people died when a large tornado tore through Tyler. It was the fourth most deadly tornado in Minnesota history.

On July 1, 2011, a tornado went through Tyler and no deaths or injuries resulted from the tornado. A few homes were considerably damaged.

== Annual events ==
Aebleskiver Days is a yearly town celebration, held on the fourth weekend of July. The event is named after æbleskiver, a spherical pancake-like food originating from Denmark. On Saturday evening, a parade runs down Main Street with floats that are made by various neighborhoods and organizations in the area.

The Lincoln County Fair is hosted at the Lincoln County Fairgrounds in Tyler during the first week of August. The Lincoln County Fair spans from the Thursday after Aebleskiver Days to the following Sunday. With local performers, bouncy houses, 4-H Livestock shows and general project showcases, open class project competition, beanbag tournaments, and a demolition derby to finish off the county fair on Sunday.

The Danebod Folk School, opened in 1888, was named in honor of a Danish queen. The campus of Danebod Folk School, including Danebod Lutheran Church, has been a part of the National Historic Register since 1975 due to both the architectural and historic significance of the structures within the district.

The Russell-Tyler-Ruthton Public Schools Homecoming Parade happens every October, after the Homecoming King and Queen are chosen on the previous Sunday, homecoming week commences.^{[3]} Local businesses have deals, Main Street gets blue and white decorations, and Friday afternoon, a parade starts at the old high school location and runs to the new K-12 school with floats that are made by the 9-12 students, local businesses, and varying organizations. The final event is the homecoming football game that Friday night.

== Transportation ==
=== Major highway ===
The following route passes through Tyler

- U.S. Route 14

=== Airport ===
The Tyler Municipal Airport is a city-owned public-use airport located one nautical mile northwest of the city.

== Notable people ==
- Bertha Lee Hansen (1882–1966), Minnesota state representative
- Richard F. Kneip (1933–1987), United States ambassador to Singapore and governor of South Dakota
- Joseph Vadheim (1893–1961), Minnesota state senator and mayor of Tyler
