= Faroese chain dance =

National circle dance of the Faroe Islands

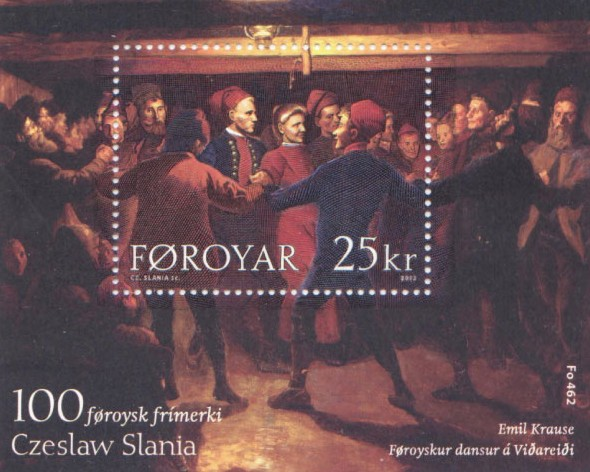
Painting of 1904 on a stamp of 2003.

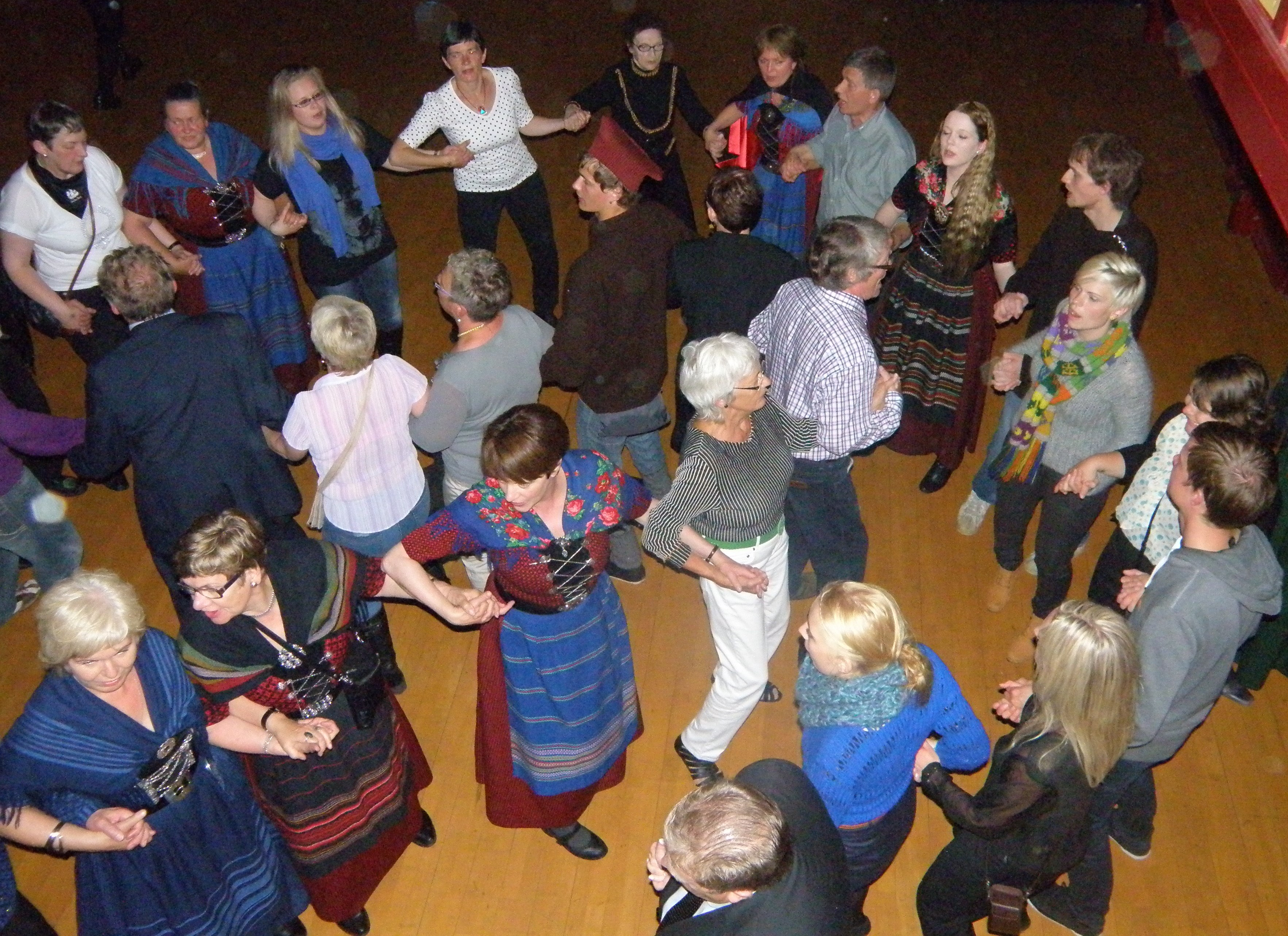
Faroese chain dance in Sjónleikarhúsið in Tórshavn on Ólavsøka 29 July 2011.

The Faroese chain dance (Faroese: Føroyskur dansur, Danish: Kædedans) is the national circle dance of the Faroe Islands, accompanied by kvæði, the Faroese ballads.

The dance is a typical Medieval dance. The dance is danced traditionally in a circle, but when there are many dancers, they usually let it swing around in various wobbles within the circle.

== Dance rules ==
When dancing there are a few rules. One is that your right hand must overlap the left hand of the one next to you while moving your feet two paces to the left and one pace back. The "skipari" is the one who sings and must know all the verses, while the people who are dancing with him in the circle join in at the chorus.

The following description is by V. U. Hammershaimb, Færøsk Anthologi, 1891:

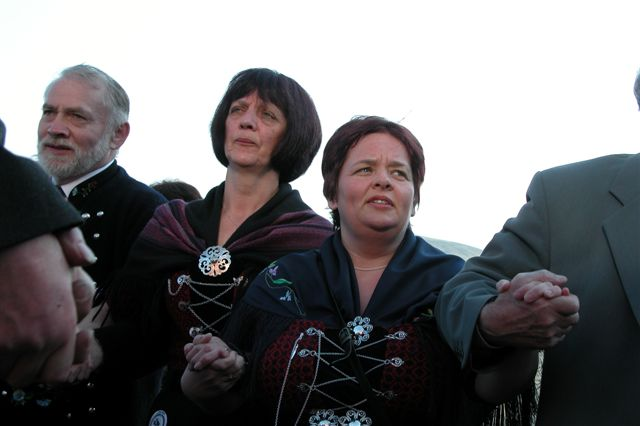
Living heritage: Folk dance in the Faroes.

The storyline of the ballad is attended by everybody with great interest, and if something especially pleasant or moving occurs, it can be seen in the look and movement of the dancers – when the rage of the battle is described, the hands are clenched together, and when victory is in hand, the dancers make cheering movements. The dance in itself only consists in holding each other's hands, while the dancers form a circle. When more and more dancers join the dance ring, the circle starts to bend and forms a new one within itself, and if the number of dancers is high enough and the space in the room allows it, a new one will form within that, too – but of course still in one unbroken circle or chain. This means every dancer must follow these curves of the chain, and soon is in the outer circle, then in the middle of the chain. The dancers thereby pass each other face-to-face twice in each round.

=== Stígingarstev - The Common Dance ===
The tunes of the ballads are in sixth bars and accompanied by a rhythmical, monotonous stamping of the feet. The most common version of the dance is the “stígingarstev” [stamping dance step].

This consists of the dancers slowly moving to their left, with six dance steps between the bars:

1. Left foot makes a step forward (to the left)
2. The right foot steps towards the left
3. Left foot makes another step forward
4. The right foot steps again towards the left
5. The right foot steps to the side or one step backwards
6. The left foot steps towards the right,

and then all over again, between the bars, until the ballad is over. If it is a solemn ballad, which is sung in a slow tempo, then the dance goes at a leisurely pace.

=== Trokingarstev - The Crowding Dance ===
Another variation of the dance is the “trokingarstev” (from: “at troka” – to crowd). Here people hold hands in the usual circle, but stand still or go a bit backwards while making the usual dance steps while the stanzas are sung, and then suddenly move forwards when the refrain starts.

For this dance, the more quick and lively ballads are used. This dance is less practiced in the northern Faroe Islands than in the southern Faroe Islands, especially in the southernmost villages. The people from Suðuroy do, all things considered, use more expression in the dance than people on the northern islands, where the emphasis is put on the monotonous stamping of the feet.

=== Bandadansur - The Ribbon Dance ===
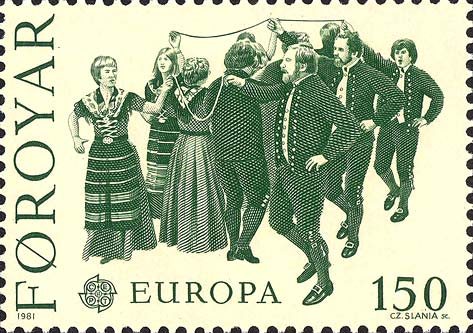
Bandadansur - the ribbon dance.

A third variant of the dance, where quick folksongs and ballads are used as well, is “bandadansur” (The Ribbons Dance).

The dancers stand in two rows, two to four feet apart – men on one side, women on the other, holding a ribbon between each couple. While the stanzas are sung, they stand still, while making the common rhythmical stamps with the feet. When the refrain starts, they raise the ribbons, and the people from the end of the row, bend over two by two and move under the raised ribbons, until they get out of the tunnel, where they turn around and raise their ribbons over the following couples. When the refrain ends, the dancers stop and lower their ribbons, and then go on like this, until the ballad ends. This is a very lively, yet rather tiring dance.

=== Dance Games ===
Besides the common dances, there are different dance games, some of which are accompanied by special songs. Some of these games are of Faroese origin, while others originate from other countries. In Svabo's fifth travel book in the Royal Library, he has described several of these dance games, which were played at gatherings indoors as well as outdoors.

== Faroese Chain Dance Associations ==
The Faroese chain dance is a living tradition. There are several Faroese Dance Associations in the Faroe Islands, and a few in Denmark too. These associations arrange for evenings with Faroese chain dance, mostly in wintertime. It is an old tradition, that people don't dance during Lent, it is believed to date back to Catholic Medieval Ages.

The dance starts normally sometime in September or October and ends at the beginning of the Lent period, which starts at Carnival in February. Most of the associations meet again after Lent, which is just after Easter and continue to meet according to their tradition, which could be once a week or once every fortnight until sometime in May or June. Normally people don't feel like dancing inside during the light summer nights.

The Faroese chain dance traditionally belongs to the dark winter nights. Because of a growing number of tourists who wish to experience the Faroese chain dance, the associations sometimes perform either for or with the tourists. One big dancing event has taken place every summer over the last years. It happens at Ólavsøka, which is the national holiday of the Faroe Islands.

After the midnight singing at midnight on 29 July the people start to dance the traditional Faroese chain dance. They also meet in Sjónleikarhúsið in Tórshavn in the evenings around Ólavsøka to dance together. No instruments are used to the Faroese chain dancing; the only music available is the song or the so-called Kvæði, which are longer or shorter texts in Faroese or in Danish, the folksongs.

The associations, which are members in Sláið Ring are these:

=== From Suðuroy ===
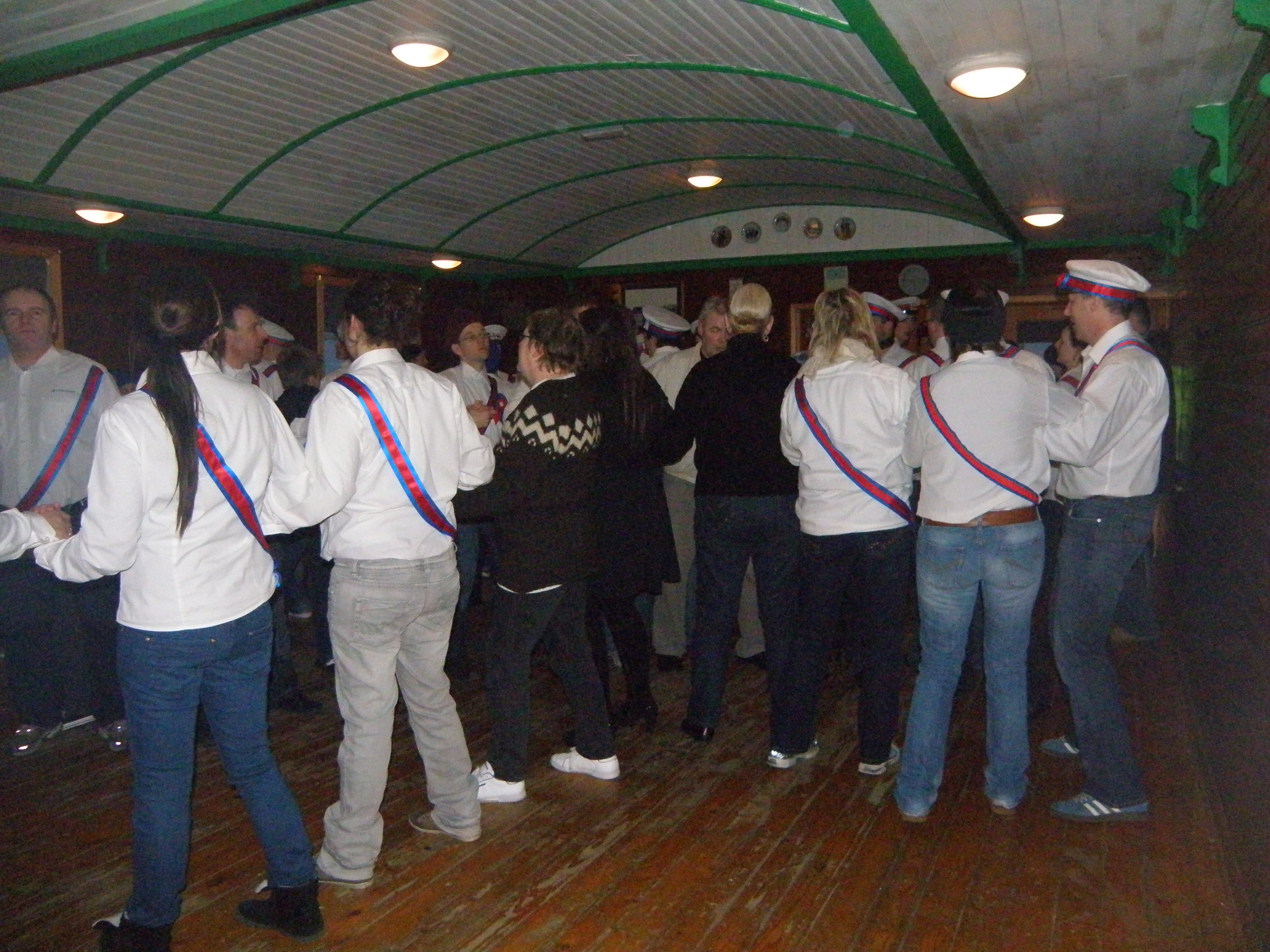
Faroese chain dance in Sumba, Faroe Islands at Carnival just before the start of the Lent 2011. Normally there is no Faroese dance in the Lent period.

- Sumbiar Dansifelag from Sumba, Faroe Islands, founded in 1966.
- Jómsvíkingar from Vágur and other villages, founded in 1976.
- Tvøroyrar Dansifelag from Tvøroyri, founded in 1983 (first time in 1958).
- Dansifelagið í Suðuroyar norðaru helvt (The Dancing Association in the Northern part of Suðuroy). Founded in 1974.

=== From Sandoy ===
- Leikum Fagurt from Sandur and other villages, founded in 1980
- Stígum Fast from Dalur, founded in 1971.

=== From Tórshavn ===
- Dansifelagið í Havn, founded in 1952.
- Dansifelag Kaggans, founded in 1980.
- Tøkum Lætt, founded in 1993.

=== From Northern Streymoy ===
- Norðstreymoyar Dansifelag

=== From Nólsoy ===
- Nólsoyar Dansifelag, founded in 1994.

=== From Vágar ===
- Vága Dansifelag, founded in 1976.

=== From Eysturoy ===
- Dansifelagið á Látrinum from Eiði, founded in 2001.
- Eysturoyar Dansifelag, founded in 1969.

=== From the Northern Islands ===
- Klaksvíkar Dansifelag, founded in 1954.

=== From Copenhagen in Denmark ===
- Fótatraðk, founded in 1988.

== See also ==
- List of ethnic, regional, and folk dances by origin
- Danish folk dance

== Sources ==
- Tjatsi.fo (Public domain, translation from Danish by Anker Eli Petersen)
