= Danish folk dance =

Traditional dancing in Denmark

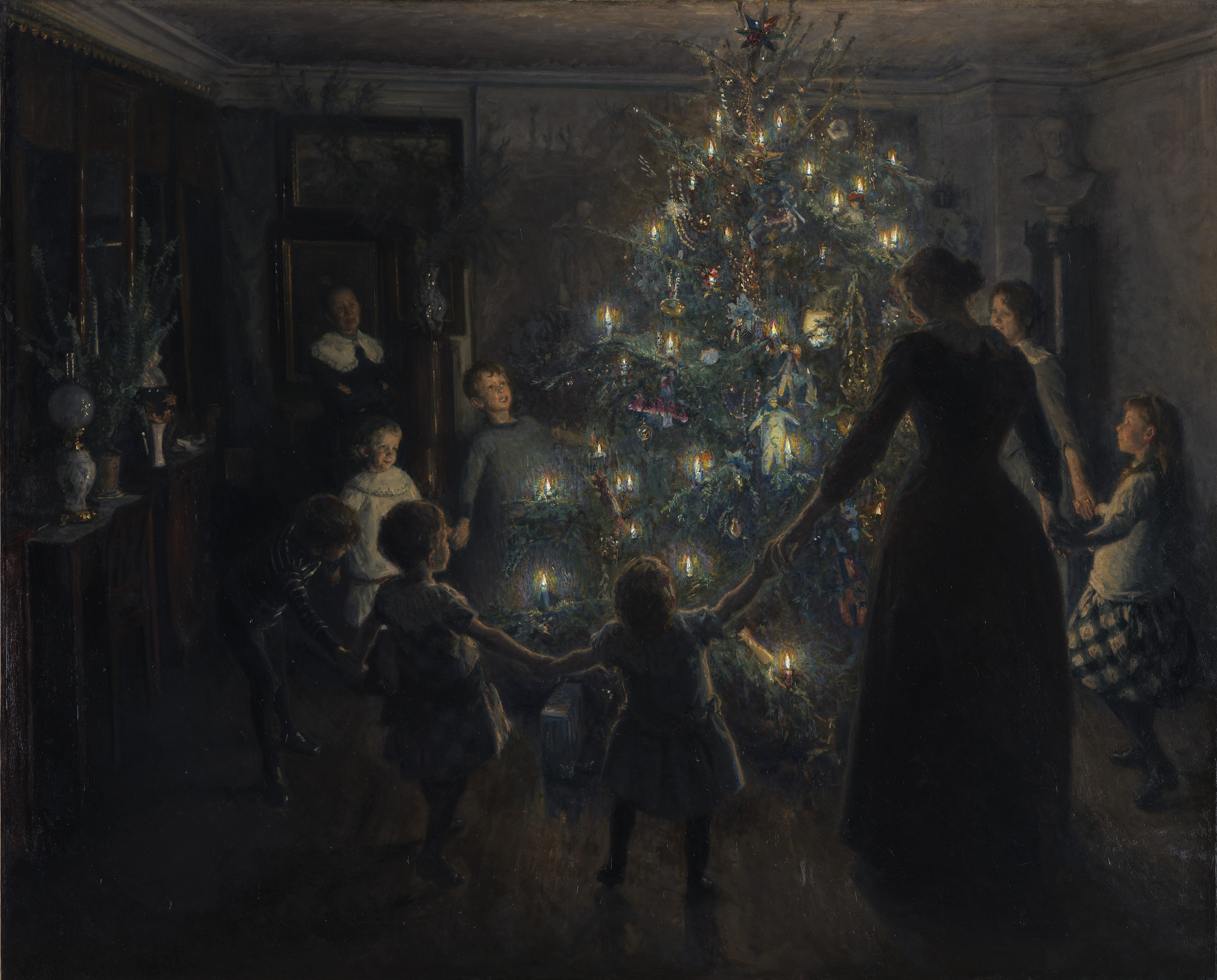
The Danish tradition of dancing around the Christmas tree still takes place every year in Danebod, the first Danish settlement in Minnesota.

Danish folk dance is characterized by being easy going, gentle, and relatively easy to learn. Danish folk dance is mainly a social dance involving groups or groups of couples of dancers, often designed for large gatherings. The dances were supposed to be simple enough for everyone to join in. Danish folk dances are made for social and educational purposes, generally speaking not for exhibitional purposes.

The canonized history of Danish folk dance highlights a performance by Philochoros in Copenhagen in 1899 with some Danish students in the audience as a triggering factor. The students were immediately so inspired that they started a folk dance club. In 1901, some of the same students who were now students of gymnastics founded a formal organization, the Danish Association for the Promotion of Folk-Dancing (Foreningen til Folkedansens Fremme).

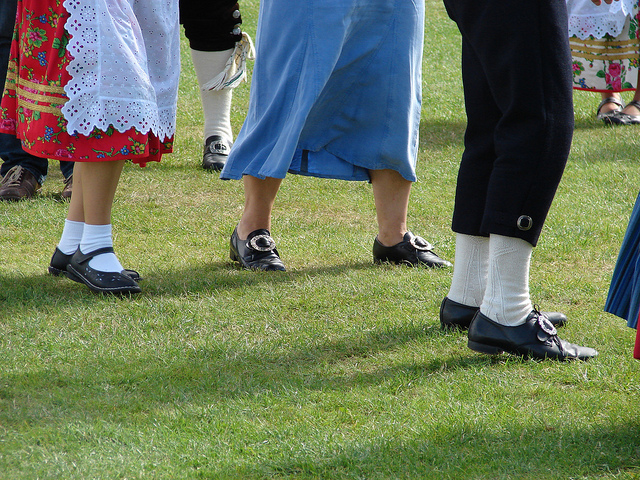
Folk-dancing on the island of Rømø

The number of folk dance organizations and societies continued to grow throughout Denmark for the following two decades. Danish Folk-Dancers was established in 1929, and is an organization that still arranges courses for folk dancers, and every year folk dance festivals are organized.

The effect of all of this had led to a certain uniformity in the performance of the Danish folk dances, thus reducing regional differences between local dances and traditions within Denmark. These societies and organizations also contributed to help preserve the Danish traditional costume as well as the folk dance. These groups produce journals, books, photographs, recipes, costumes, props, and other cultural artifacts as well. They organized demonstrations, theatrical exhibitions, festivals, open houses for dancing, and other social events.

== See also ==
- Faroese dance
- Danish folklore
- Anna Sofie Boesen Dreijer
