= Kassel University Library =

Library of the University of Kassel, Germany

Coordinates: 51°19′18″N 9°30′19″E

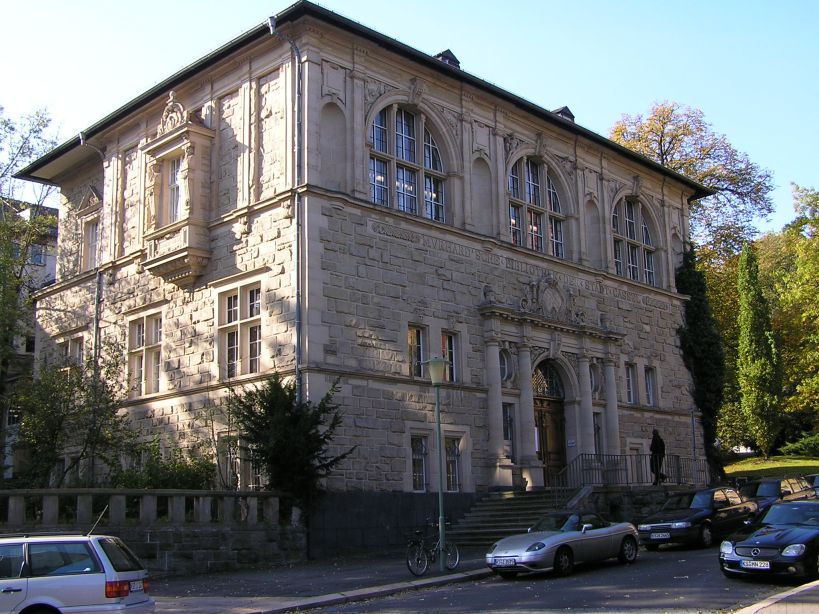
View of the Landes- und Murhardschen Bibliothek, 2004

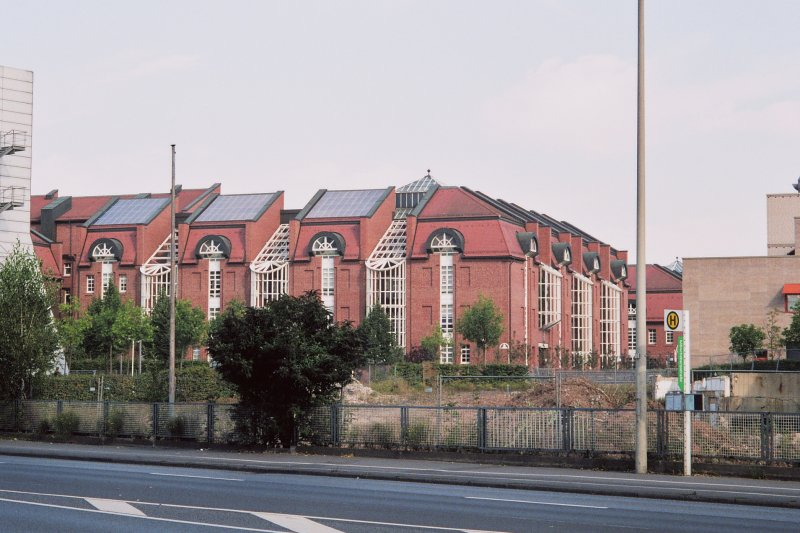
View of the University Library

The Universitätsbibliothek Kassel (or Kassel University Library) is a library located in the city of Kassel, Germany. Composed of the collections of the former Landesbibliothek (state library) and Murhardsche Bibliothek der Stadt Kassel (Murhard Library of the City of Kassel) as well as that of the Kassel University library, amongst the library's holdings is the manuscript of the 9th-century German poem, the Hildebrandslied.

The first component of the library, the Landesbibliothek, evolved from the collection of the Kassel Court Library of the Landgraves of Hesse, and was officially made a "state library" with the Hesse Constitution of 1831. Its collection was housed at the Fridericianum, continental Europe's first public museum, and specialized in the fields of history, philology, archaeology, art, geography, theology, and law.

The second component library, the Murhardsche Bibliothek der Stadt Kassel long served as the city's second research library. Founded in 1845 by the brothers Friedrich and Karl Murhard, sons of an old Hessian merchant dynasty, it specialized in political science, economics, and pedagogy.

The British Royal Air Force destroyed most of the library by aerial bombing on 9 September 1943, about 7/8 of its holdings of ca. 400,000 volumes. Even the books kept in safes smoldered away due to the surrounding heat. The Zwehren Tower, however, which holds large parts of the manuscripts, remains unscathed.

The third component library comprised the holdings of Kassel University, founded in it modern incarnation in 1970.

The three libraries were merged into a single system in 1976.
