= Joseph Vadheim =

American druggist, businessman, and politician

Joseph Vadheim (November 14, 1893 – May 30, 1961) was an American druggist, businessman, and politician.

Vadheim was born in Garretson, Minnehaha County, South Dakota. He lived in Tyler, Lincoln County, Minnesota, graduated from Tyler High School, and from University of Minnesota School of Pharmacy.. He also lived with his wife and family, in Tyler, Minnesota and was a pharmacist and businessman. Vadheim served in the United States Army during World War I. Vadheim served as mayor of Tyler, Minnesota and on the Tyler City Council. He also served in the Minnesota Senate from 1955 until his death in 1961. He died from a heart attack at a hospital in Tyler, Minnesota.
