= Medisterpølse =

Type of Scandinavian sausage

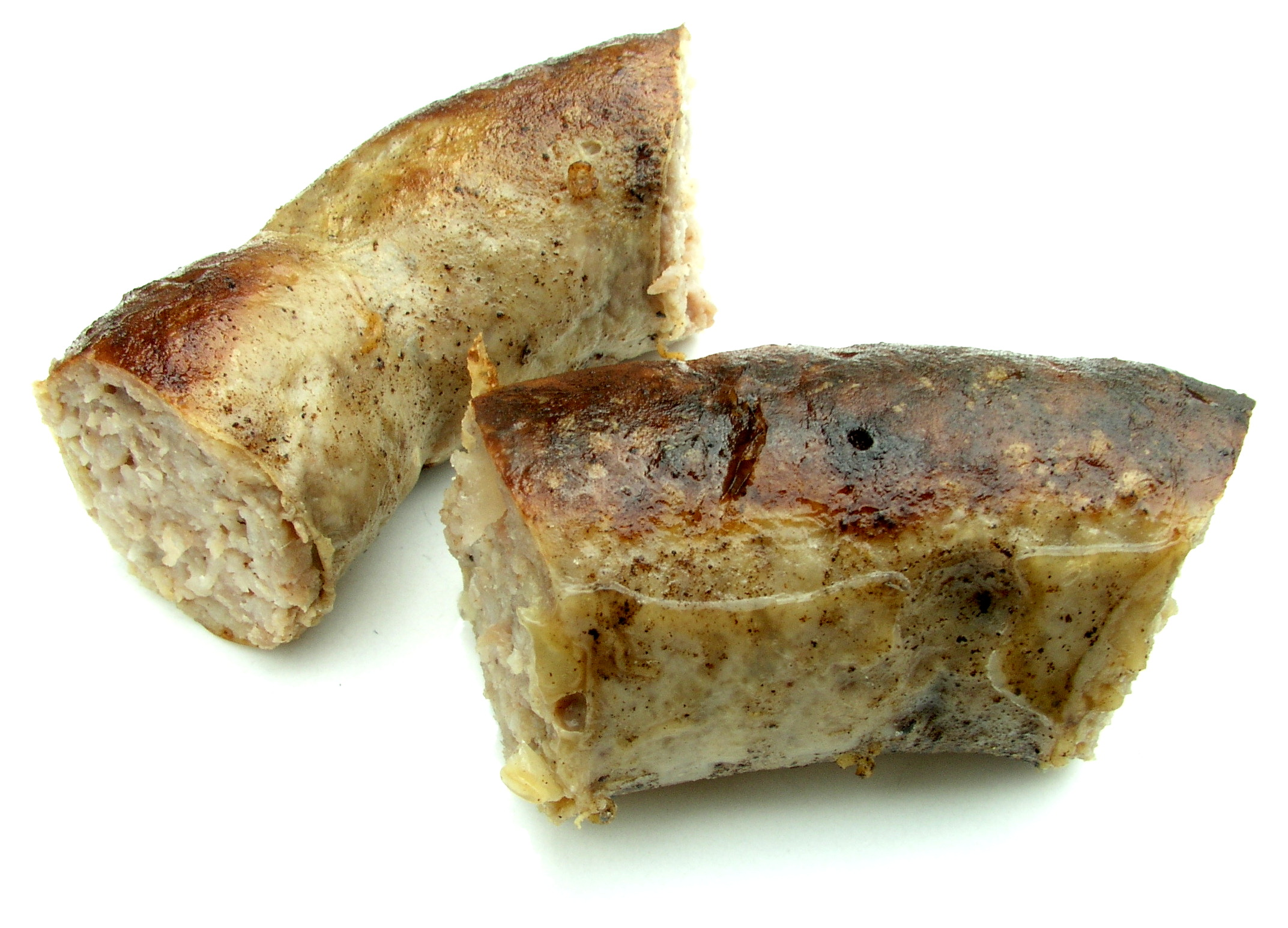
Pieces of fried medister, of approx. 5 cm.

Medisterpølse, medisterkorv or simply medister is a Scandinavian specialty food consisting of a thick spiced sausage made of minced pork and suet (or lard), stuffed into a casing. It is slightly sweet-tasting, and the finely ground meat is seasoned with chopped onion, allspice, cloves, salt and pepper. It is a traditional dinner sausage in Danish and Norwegian cuisine, somewhat similar to British Cumberland sausage.

The word medister is derived from a combination of the Middle Low German word met (pork, cf. English: "meat") and ister, suet'. It was first used in print in a Swedish housekeeping book from the early 16th century. The sausage recipe has changed since then as the meat filling used to be hand-chopped with a knife, while today it is chopped very finely by machine, giving the sausage a different texture. It is made in one very long piece and then cut up after cooking, before serving. In contrast to many other types of sausage, medister is kept fresh and only cooked or fried during the final preparation. For this reason medister must be kept cool (or frozen) until preparation.

== See also ==
- Klobasa
- List of pork dishes
- List of sausages
