= Ásmundar saga kappabana =

14th-century Icelandic saga

Ásmundar saga kappabana is the saga of Asmund the Champion-Killer, a legendary saga from Iceland, first attested in the manuscript Stockholm, Royal Library, Holm. 7, 4to, from the first half of the fourteenth century. It is essentially an adaptation of the German Hildebrandslied, but it has assimilated matter from the Tyrfing Cycle.

== Synopsis ==
The saga relates that Hildebrand, the king of the Huns had a son named Helgi, who was married to Hild, the daughter of the Swedish king Budli. Helgi and Hild had a son who was raised by his grandfather and named Hildebrand after him.

Hildebrand became a great warrior and was called the Hunnish champion. When his father Helgi had fallen in a war, his maternal grandfather, the Swedish king Budli, was killed by a Danish king by the name Alf. This Alf took Hildebrand's mother Hild captive and gave her to the champion Aki with whom she had the son Asmund.

When Hildebrand learnt of his father's death, he went to Denmark and slew Alf. However, Alf had a daughter to whom Asmund proposed for marriage. The princess promised to marry Asmund, if he avenged her father and killed Hildebrand.

In order to slay Hildebrand, Asmund went to Saxony, which was plagued by Hildebrand and his berserkers. During a series of holmgangs which took several days, Asmund defeated all Hildebrand's warriors.

When Hildebrand heard of this, berserker-rage came over him and in his rage he killed his own son. Then he went up the Rhine to meet Asmund and when they met they started to fight. They fought well for a long time, until Hildebrand was severely wounded and his sword broke. Then Hildebrand sang to Asmund that they were half-brothers and asked him to be buried in his clothes.

In Gesta Danorum 7:IX.2-X.1, Saxo Grammaticus tells an essentially identical saga, but all the names are different, with the figure corresponding to Hildebrand called Hildiger.

== Sources ==
- An article on Asmund in Nordisk familjebok
- An article on Hildebrand in Nordisk familjebok
