= Kvæði =

Faroese ballads

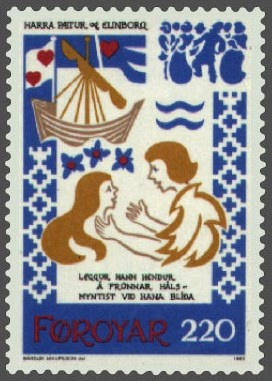
Faroese stamp depicting the Faroese ballad Harra Pætur & Elinborg

Kvæði are the old ballads of the Faroe Islands, accompanied by the Faroese chain dance. They typically recite stories and can have hundreds of stanzas plus a chorus sung between every verse.

== History ==
It is generally thought that Faroese ballads, as elsewhere in Europe, began to be composed in the Middle Ages, but very little medieval Faroese writing survives, so the ballads' medieval history is obscure. The subject matter of Faroese ballads varies widely, including heroic narratives set in the distant past, contemporary politics, and comic tales. The most archaic-looking layer, however, is the heroic narratives. It was once thought that these derive independently from Viking-Age oral narratives, and this may be true of a few, but it has since been shown that most derive directly from written Icelandic sagas or occasionally rímur. The traceable origins of Faroese balladry, then, seem to lie between the fourteenth century (when the relevant Icelandic sagas tended to be composed) and the seventeenth (when contacts with Iceland diminished).

Faroese ballads began to be collected by Jens Christian Svabo in 1781–1782, though Svabo's collection was not published in his lifetime; the most prominent of Svabo's successors was Venceslaus Ulricus Hammershaimb. The Danish historians Svend Grundtvig and Jørgen Bloch began the process of a complete, standard edition of the ballads, which eventually gave rise to the Føroya kvæði/Corpus Carminum Færoensium, published between 1941 and 2003. In the last volume, Marianne Clausen presented a large collection of music transcriptions of kvæði melodies, based on sound recordings.

In the eighteenth to twentieth centuries, scholars have information about how kvæði were performed: "the family-oriented kvøldseta, in which aurally memorized texts of family ballads were sung to pass the time, and the village dance, in which the memorized texts of the kvøldseta were performed by ballad owners who might add or delete stanzas in order to suit the mood of the dancers".

Ballads played an important role in the development of Faroese national consciousness and the promotion of literacy in the Faroes in the nineteenth and twentieth centuries.

== Examples ==
Among the most famous of all kvæði is Sjúrðarkvæði, which tells the story of Sjúrður Sigmundarson (Sigurd), containing material from Þiðreks saga and Völsunga saga. Other well known examples include Ormurin langi, written by Jens Christian Djurhuus, which tells the story of the Battle of Svolder, and Ragnars kvæði, both of which have modern renditions by the Faroese folk metal band Týr. Sniolvs kvæði is another example.

A passage from Mariu vísa fyrra illustrates the structure of kvæði:

Tað var jomfrú Maria,
hon gongur eftir vegnum fram,
møtir henni eingilin Gabriel,
hann heilsar henni við navn.

- Nú er Jesus vár skjøldur
- í hvørjum vanda.

"Hoyr tú, jomfrú Maria,
tú ert ein liljuvand,
I skal føde det velsignede barn,
lovet være den hellig ånd.

Hoyr tú, jomfrú Maria,
I er et liljekvist,
I skal føde det velsignede barn,
lovet være du, Jesus Krist."

Tað var jomfrú Maria,
hon svarar eitt orð dertil:
"Jeg er Herrens tjenerinde,
mig ske, som Jesus vil."

Jólanátt tey sótu,
føddur var Harrin so rein,
tá stóð alt í stilli,
bæði sól og máni skein.

Jólanátt tey sótu,
føddur var Harrin so góð,
tá stóð alt í stilli,
bæði veður og vatn og flóð.

Hvør, ið hesa vísuna syngur,
tá ið hann fer til sjó,
óræddur skal hann tann sama dag
bæði sigla og ró.

Hvør, ið hesa vísuna syngur,
tá ið hann leggur seg at sova,
hann verður ei í svøvni svikin,
tað hevur sjálvur Jesus lovað.

Translation:

That was the Virgin Mary,
She goes forward along the ways:
The angel Gabriel meets her;
He greets her by name.

Now Jesus is our protection in every danger.

"Do you hear O Virgin Mary?
Thou art a lily wand;
You shall bear the blessed child.
Praised be the Holy Spirit.

"Do you hear O Virgin Mary?
You are the lily branch;
You shall bear the blessed Child.
Praised be you, O Jesus Christ."

That was the Virgin Mary.
She answers a word to this,
"I am the servant of the Lord,
It shall be to me as Jesus wishes."

They waited on Yule night.
The Lord so pure was born.
Then stood everything in quiet,
Both sun and moon shone.

They waited on Yule night.
The Lord so good was born,
Then all things stood in quiet;
Both air and water and flood.

Whoever sings this verse,
Whenever he goes to sea,
Fearless he shall that same day,
Both sail and row.

Whoever sings this verse,
Whenever he lays himself to sleep,
He will not be betrayed in sleep;
That has Jesus Himself promised.

== English translations ==
- The Völsung Ballads from the Faroe Islands in English Translation. Translated by Helen Leslie-Jacobsen; Mortan Nolsøe. Arc Humanities Press. 2025. ISBN 9781802700428.
- N. Kershaw (1921). Stories and Ballads of the Far Past. Cambridge: Cambridge University Press. Also available at Project Gutenberg.
