= Tyler Municipal Airport =

- IATA: none; ICAO: none; FAA LID: 63Y

Summary
- Airport type: Public
- Owner: City of Tyler
- Time zone: CST (UTC−06:00)
  - Summer (DST): CDT (UTC−05:00)
- Elevation AMSL: 1,732 ft / 531 m
- Coordinates: 44°17′30″N 096°09′1.2″W

Map
- Location of airport in Minnesota 63Y (the United States)

Runways
Direction	Length		Surface
Direction	ft	m	Surface
14/32	2,600 x 160	792 × 49	Turf

Tyler Municipal Airport (FAA LID: 63Y) is an airport located 1 mile north west of Tyler, Minnesota, United States. The airport has a single lighted turf runway and rotating beacon. The taxiways are also lighted.

== History ==
The airport underwent an improvement in 1999 to correct drainage issues. The nearby golf course was expanded to 18 holes at the same time.

== See also ==
- List of airports in Minnesota
