= Salige (disambiguation) =

A Salige is short for Salige Frau, a fabulous wild woman in certain German-speaking regions, or,

== Arts and entertainment ==
- Salige (film) - 2006 short film concerning a Salige Frau

== People ==
- Johann Salige (c. 1485–1530) - German merchant and politician, councilor of Lübeck.
