= Wild man =

Mythical figure

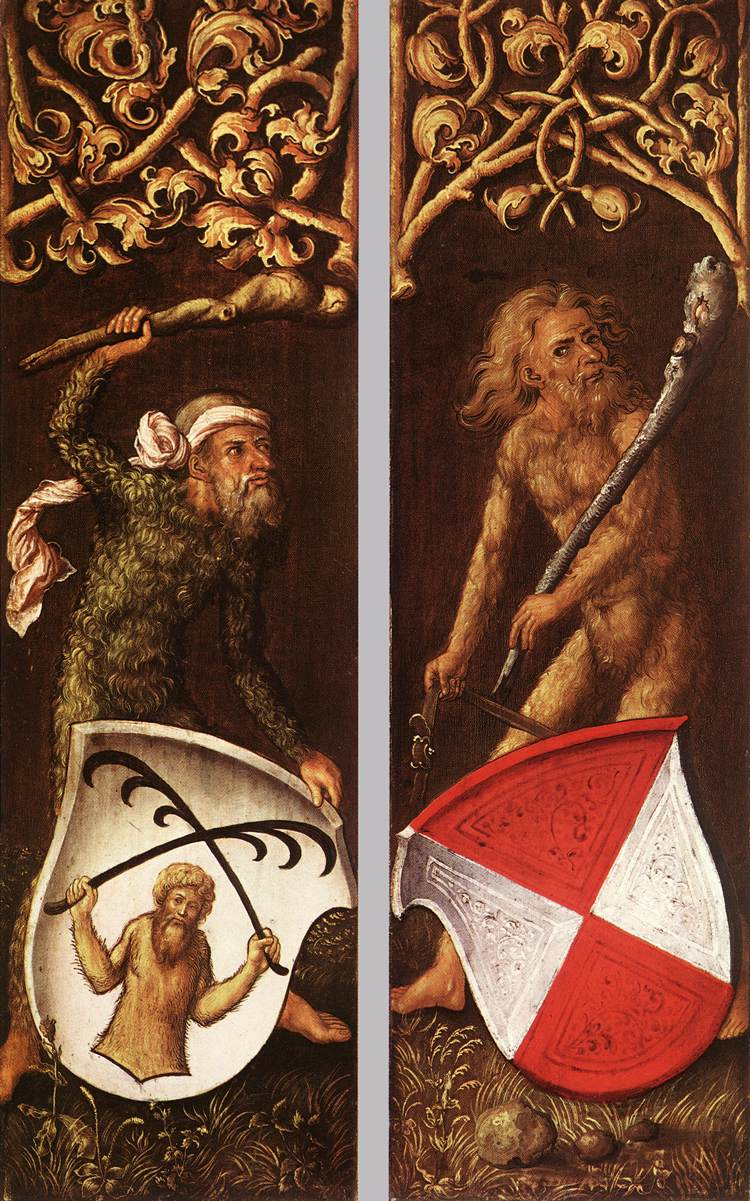
Wild men support coats of arms in the side panels in Portrait of Oswald Krell (1499) by Albrecht Dürer —Alte Pinakothek museum, Munich.

The wild man (German: Wilder Mann, der Wilde Mann), or wild man of the woods, is a mythical figure and motif resembling a hairy human that appears in the art and literature of medieval Europe. Generally they are considered a large-statured race of humans who are hairy all over their body, and live in the wilderness or woodlands. They are often thought to be covered with moss, or wear green or vegetative clothing, and iconically wield a club or hold an uprooted tree as a staff. They also occur in female versions as wild women.

The Wilde Mann (Middle High German: wilde man) is attested in Middle High German literature, particularly German heroic epics, (Note: Such as Sigenot.) while the female Wilde Weib (wildez wîp) figures in the Arthurian works, (Note: i.e., Wigamur and Wigalois.) typically appear as adversaries. These beings are also called by names meaning "wood men" (Note: Middle High German: waltman.) and in older forms of the language, "wood maiden", (Note: Old High German: holzmuoja.) "wood wife", (Note: Old High German: holzwîb.) or "wood woman". (Note: Old High German: holzvrouwe.) In Middle English a corresponding term for the wild man is woodwose or wodewose. (Note: OED online for "woodwose" gives British pronunciations of /ˈwʊdwəʊs/ WUUD-wohss or /ˈwʊdwəʊz/ and US pronunciations of /ˈwʊdˌwoʊs/ WUUD-wohss or /ˈwʊdˌwoʊz/ WUUD-wohz)

In the folklore of German-speaking areas collected mainly in the 19th century, there are especially the Alpine wild men and wild women. These beings could be man-hunters or otherwise be sinister, but could also endow luck or bounty, exhibiting aspects of woodland spirits.

The folklore that had developed in the mining areas around Harz or Ore Mountains by the 16th century regarded the wild man of the mines (also known as "mountain monk" (Note: German: Bergmönch.)) as potentially both dangerous and beneficent, guiding humans to the discovery of ore deposits. The house of the Princes of Brunswick-Wolfenbüttel (Brunswick-Lüneburg), which controlled one of the silver mines, minted silver thaler ('dollar') coinage with the wild man in their coat-of-arms, starting 1539.

These wild men had already frequently appeared in European family heraldic devices since the latter half of the 15th century. (Note: Cf. Christian I of Denmark's coat of arms (1449), with wild man as shield-supporter.) It also became commonplace to depict the wild man as shield-bearers of the family coat of arms (e.g., within a portrait painting by Albrecht Dürer, cf. image right). (Note: Cf. also Martin Schongauer's works during the 1480s, described below.) This period also roughly coincides with the popularization of the concept of the "noble wild man" or "noble savage" as can already be seen in Hans Sachs's "Lament of the Wild Men" (1530), and also reflected in artistic depictions of the wild folk from this period onward.

The wild man or wild woman in folklore was believed to be the protector of the (sustainability of) wild game, especially the chamois (German: Gemse), and stories tell of the hunter who breached the taboo being knocked off a precipice or turned into stone.

The defining characteristic of the figure is its "wildness"; iconography from the 12th century onward has consistently depicted the wild man as being covered with hair. Around the same transition period, biblical (Note: Prime example: Nebuchadnezzar II of Babylon who went mad.) or other humans afflicted with madness came to be conventionally depicted with hairiness, and subsequently, literary figures who temporarily lose sanity and live in the wild (Merlin, Ywain) also came to be associated with wild men.

== Terminology ==
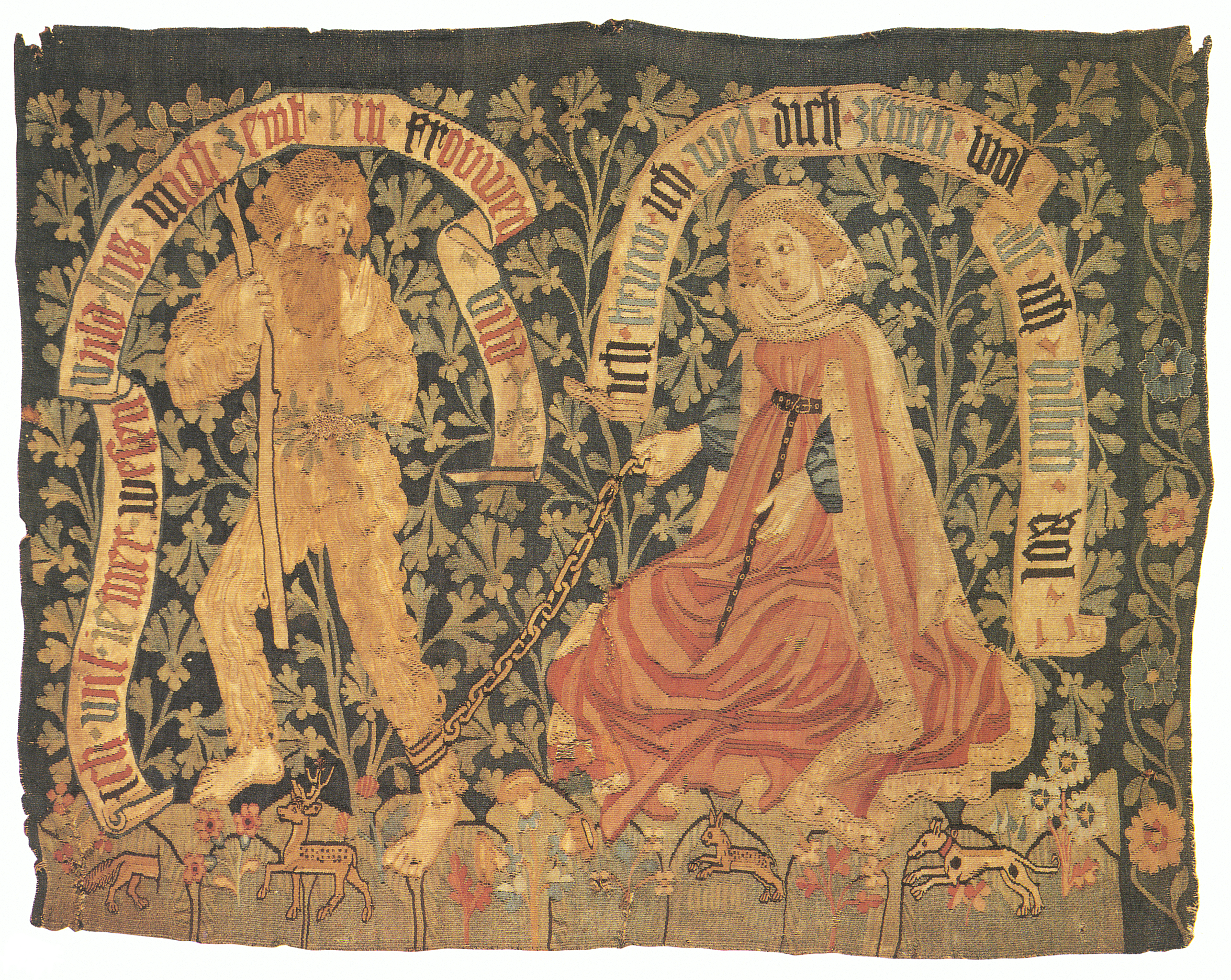
Late 15th century tapestry from Basel, showing a wild man being tamed by a virtuous lady

"Wild man" is a technical term in use since the Middle Ages, applied to a hairy human-like creature with certain animal-like traits but which has not quite descended to the level of ape; it may have hairless spots around the face, palms, feet, sometimes elbows and knees, and around the breasts in case of the female "wild woman". If the creature exhibits additional animal-like traits, it may not be a wild man in question, but rather the satyr, faun, or the devil (Bernheimer's definition).

"Wild man" and its cognates in some languages are the common terms for the creature in most modern languages; it appears in German as wilder Mann, in French as homme sauvage. However, in Italian, uomo selvatico ("forest man") is often used (var. selvaggio).

The German wild man (Der Wilde) also occurs in a more modern folklore tradition, localized in a region spanning from Switzerland to Carinthia, Austria (and often Hesse in Germany) according to the Handwörterbuch des deutschen Aberglaubens (HdA), registered under such names as wilde Frau, Wildfrau, -en, wilde Fraulein, Wildfräulein wilder Mann, Wildmannli, wilde Männle, Wildmännlein. Plural forms are: wilde Männer, or wilde Leute or wilde Menschen. Females are also called wildes Weib (pl. wilde Weiber).

The "wild man" is attested in Middle High German as wilde man in the 13th century, once in a lyrical poem (Note: By Heinrich Frauenlob, cf. § German epic below for further information) alluding to the story of the giant Sigenot, i.e., an epic featuring both giant and wild man, from the Dietrich von Bern cycle. (Note: The older form of Sigenot (c. 1250) only survived in fragments, hence the contents are only known from later versions called Younger Sigenot (jüngerer Sigenot) in manuscripts and printed editions from the 15th century, which therefore is not a Middle High German attestation.) Another attestation occurs in the Arthurian romance Wigamur which gives wilde man (v. 203), as well as the female form wildez wîp (vv. 112, 200, 227ff.) (For additional examples in MHG literature cf. § German epics below).

In Old High German, the term wildaz wîp (lit. 'wild wife, wild woman') together with holzmuoja, holzmoia (lit. 'wood maiden') (Note: Where muoja is cognate to Gothic mawi meaning "girl". Bernheimer came up with his own etymology that -muoia/-moia was related to Latin maia hence also connected to Maia, a Greco-Roman fertility goddess. In this connection, Bernheimer mistakenly read <rite of goddess Maia> where actually <May festival> ("Kalendas Maias") in a 9-10th century penitential, as can be clarified by comparison with a variant text, and the connection he made with wild woman or holzmoia are pointed out to be invalid, though Russell conjectures animal pelts may have been worn.) occurs in a glossary under the heading of the Latin term lamia (female monster). (Note: The glossary source given as "Gloss. mons." or "Gloss monst." by Grimm; a 10th century glossary from Mondsee in Austria according to Bernheimer. This is presumably ÖNB 2723, similar in content to ÖNB 2732, another biblical glossary compiled at Salzburg. Under the heading of "Lamia", this codex 2732 (abbreviated d) lists "holzmuoia ꝉ vuildazvuip".) The same glossary under the heading of Latin ulula (lit. 'screech owl' but here understood to be equivalent to strix of mythology) gives the gloss wildiu wîp. (Note: Grimm explains ululae to be "funereal birds, death-boding wives, still called in later times klagefrauen.. resembling the prophetic Berhta" (Perchta, for which cf. Frau Berta below), and altogether as denoting "she who wails or moos (German: muhende) in the forest". Lexer's definition of holzmuoje gives either a wood specter (Gespenst) or wood owl (Eule).) There are also the forms holzwib (holzwîb), (Note: "Lammia" is glossed holzwib in Heinrici Summarium liber XI g.= Clm. 17151, 17153, 17194. these 3 codices (and Cms. 17152 as well as others) were compiled at "Scheftlarn", whereas Bernheimer refers to one compiled at Schäftlarn.) (Note: The other mention by Bernheimer is "vvidiz vvip" which matches "Lamia" glossed as hol^{z}ethmugi vel vvîdiz vvîp in Glossae Salmonis d = Clm. 23496) (Note: "Ulula" is glossed holzmugi in Glossae Salmonis a1 sigla i = Cms. 17152,) as well as holzvrouwe and numerous others.

Another old example is the mention of "ad domum wildero wîbo" ("house of the wild women"), a piece of landmark or toponymy somewhere in Hessen, (Note: Folklore identifies the wild women's house as the gigantic slabs of basalt along the Kinzig river, in Bernhardswald near Schlüchtern.) mentioned in Codex Eberhardi (c. 1150) by the monk Eberhard of Fulda or a redaction given by Johann Pistorius the Younger (d. 1608). (Note: Grimm cites Dronke ed. (1844) Ex codice eberhardi monachi. Capitulum XV on Salchenmunster (Salmünster), p. 544, but this is incorrect. Dronke (1844), p. 56 has a lacuna after "Ellenstein. inde in iazaha" therefore fails to mention the wild wives' den in question, and the omission needs be supplemented by the unbroken text in Pistorius (1726), p. 544, which reads "..ellenstein usque in jazaha, & sic sursum, in herlihenbrunnen ad ad domum wilderouuibo". Alternate forms such as "domum uuildero uuibo" or "domum wilderouuibo" are given in redactions by modern editors.) (Note: Rushing (2016), endnote 54 to Chapter 1, considers this mention of the wilde Weib as the oldest references, relying on Mannhardt's dating of 10th century.)

=== Wood-folk type synonyms ===
The wild man is referred to as waltluoder in Wolfdietrich, (Note: MHG luoder is glossed as mod. German Luder meaning "bait, enticement" or "hussy".) and in the same work, the title hero must deal with the advances of Rauhe Else ("Shaggy Else"), classified as a wild woman (cf. § German epic below).

In the epic Laurin the wild man is referred to as a waltmann (lit. 'wood man'). The same term waltman is used in Iwein to characterize the herdsman as a wild man, and he is also described as being as hairy as a walttôren (lit. 'wood fool') (Cf. Iwein discussed below under § Medieval iconography).

A group of OHG glosses for wild woman (lamia, etc.) was already discussed above. In MHG, an attested synonym for wild woman is holz-wîp (lit. 'wood wife'). (Note: Otn. Cod. Dresd. 277 (Ortnit).)

In modern regional folklore, the creatures with sylvan (wood-related) names that correspond to the Alpine wild folk are the Holzleute or Moosleute (wood- or moss people) of Central Germany, Franconia, and Bavaria; Holzfräulein aka Waldfräulein, Waldweiblein of the Bohemian Forest and the Upper Palatinate; the Waldweiblein and Moosweiblein (lit. 'moss maiden') of the Harz mountains region; the Lohjungfer (lit. 'grove maiden'; pl. Lohjungfern) of Halle further east in Saxony; and the Buschweiblein (lit. 'bush maiden') of Westphalia. Usage of names such as Lohjungfer, Holzfräulein, Mossweibchen extends further south in Saxon Vogtland.

Waldfänke is synonymous to wilder Mann, (Note: Vonbun (1862) Beiträge pp. 46, 47,) which is an exception, since Fang(e) and its extensions (cf. Fänge below) generally refer to females. The variant form Waldfenken-Geißler is also given in commentary. As for Geißler ("goatherd") or Kühler ("cowherd"), the wild man may be designated by the name of his profession in a narrative where he is engaged in the herding of livestock. (Note: HdA n66, citing Fient Präftigau p. 142; Mannhardt (1904), 1: 96; Rochholz Nr. 228 "Geißler von Klosters"; Vonbun (1889) Sagen, pp. 41, 61; etc.)

Cf. also the etymological relation between the term "sylvan" ("of the woods"), the French term sauvage meaning "wild", and the Sal- group of names for the wild men used in the Italian Alps (Trentino-Alto Adige/Südtirol) region under § Other aliases below. Cf. also "woodwose" under § English terms.

=== Other aliases ===
Folklore in Tyrol and German-speaking Switzerland into the 20th century refers to the wild woman called Fänge (var. Fängge/Faengge, Fankke, Fang, Fange, Fangge, Fangga, Fanggin), commented as being equivalent to Selige Fräulein (Salige Frau) This name is thought to be post-medieval neologism deriving from the Latin fauna, the feminine form of faun. The wild women of the Alpine region are "identical to or closely related to" the Fänggen or the Salige (Salige Frauen). The extended form Wild-Fang is considered a male noun (ein Wild-fang), but Wild-fang (var. Wildfangg) is still applied to a female. (Note: Also used figuratively to denote a headstrong or carefree hussey ("young unruly creature,.. frolicsome girl").)

The wild man is called a Bilmon (Note: var. Bedelmon, Bildemon.) (corruption of "wild man"), Salvadegh, or Salvanel in Wälsch-Tirol (present-day Trento Province), which may be spelt Salvan or Salvang, (Note: Salvang in usage around Fassa Valley, Enneberg (Mareo), Heiligkreuzkofel (Sas dla Crusc) according to HdA.) with usage extending to Lombardy. The wild man is called l'om salvadegh by Ladin language-speakers in Folgrait (Folgaria) and Trambileno; this is readily recognizable as equivalent to French l'homme sauvage, where Old French salvage derives from Latin silvāticus "sylvan, pertaining to forest". Hence the names in this grouping are related to Silvanus, the Roman tutelary god of gardens and the countryside. The (medieval Latin) term silvaticus was in fact used in the sense of "wild woman" by Burchard of Worms in the 10th century, (Note: Cited and quoted by Grimm: "agrestes feminas quas silvaticas vocant, et quando voluerint ostendunt se suis amatoribus, et cum eis dicunt se oblectasse, et item quando voluerint abscondunt se et evanescunt (The wild women whom they call sylvans; and they show themselves as they wish, to see their lovers or tell them they have delighted themselves with them, and when they wish to hide, they disappear)".) and it has been suggested he was referring to beings who would have been called Selvang in dialect according to modern-day folklore.

The local name Frauberte or Frau Berta was supposedly current either in Ronchi near Ala, or the aforementioned Folgrait and Trambileno areas. (Note: It is not clear if this Ronchi near Ala refers to Ronchital=Valle dei Ronchi that lies further east than Ala, Folgrait (Folgaria), or Trambileno.) Likewise there are a sort of wild women known as Berchtra or Perchta (diminutive: Perchtel) in Carinthia. (Note: Called Pechtra or Pechtra-baba by the Carinthian Slovenes according to Graber, but only the -baba is a pan-Slavic stem.)

It is contended that the Norgg (Note: Hans Fink (1990): "Der Wilde begegnet uns unter verschiedenen Namen, so z. B. als Loter, Pettl, Lorgg, Norgg oder Gletschmann") or Orke or Orge; (Note: Definite or possibly diminutive forms: Orken, Orgen.) Lorgg or Lorge; (Note: Altered to Lorke by Bernheimer) (Note: Definite or possibly diminutive form: Lorgen.) or Nörglein, (Note: Transliterated as Noerglein by Bernheimer.) Nörkel, Örggele in folklore from parts of the Alps, particularly Tyrol, also may correspond to the wild man, (Note: Schwarz (1941), p. 970 citing Heyl (1897), p. 230, "43. Von den Örggelen in Sarnthal" and E. H. Meyer Germ. Mythol. (recté Myth. der Germanen, 1903)) with the proviso that these (especially diminutives) are names for "wild dwarf people". (Note: Zingerle in Purzinigele (a Rumpelstiltskin type tale), also glosses the diminutive Nörglein as "Zwerg, Wachtelmännchen (dwarf, quail-manikin[?])".) This appears to be connected to Italian orco (Neapolitan: huorco, pl. orci) in the sense of "subterraneans" (Note: German: Unterirdischen.) (≈dwarfs or gnomes), or perhaps rather a "harmless wild folk" version of the orco such as appears in the literary fairy tales of the Pentamerone. The Italian orco is cognate to French ogre, as is modern literary orcs, and is related to Orcus, a Roman and Italic god of death. (Note: Importantly to Bernheimer, Orcus was associated with Maia in a dance celebrated late enough to be condemned in the aforementioned penitential, but the document is about May Festival not Maia's festival, and the phrase exercere Orcum may mean no more than a "hellish" exercise.)

The Rüttelweib, Rittelweibe (lit. 'shaking wife'; pl. Rüttelweiber (Note: pl. var. Rüttelweibern, Rittelweibern.)) of the Giant Mountains is another being corresponding to the wild woman of the Alpine Region.

=== English terms ===
In Old English/Anglo-Saxon there has been recorded the term wude-wāsa meaning "satyr" or "faun", a compound of wude "woodland, forest" and wasa of uncertain etymology, though perhaps meaning "forest dweller"; or else it may perhaps be a compound formed from *wāsa "being", from the verb wesan, wosan "to be, to be alive".

From it has derived Middle English woodwose, wodewose, woodehouse. Variant spellings include wodewese, etc. The ME term wodehose was ambiguously singular or plural. (Note: OED: "sometimes taken for or construed as pl.") (Note: Presumably plural in "full [of] wodwos & oþer wylde bestes" (The Wars of Alexander v. 1540, Also plural (tr. "wild men") in Sir Gawain and the Green Knight below.) The (modern) pronunciation of woodwose varies, and may end in an s-like or z-like stress.

As for examples of usage, Wycliffe's Bible (after 1382 [to 1395]), in Isaiah 13:21, used wodewoos (pl. wodewoosis (Note: Wycliffe (a1392) ther shuln dwelle there ostricchis & wodewoosis;) (Note: Incidentally, "ostrich" here is rendered "siren" in LXX and Vulgate.) rather than the King James Version's "satyr" to translate the original Hebrew שעיר (pronounced sa'ir, meaning "hairy [one]"). Latin translation gave pilosi, and LXX rendered as δαιμόνια (daimon).

In Sir Gawain and the Green Knight (c. 1390), Gawain is said to have fought with worms (dragons) as well as a "wodwos" that lived in the craggy rocks; (Note: Gawain vv. 720–721 "Sumwhyle wyth wormez he werrez.. /Sumwhyle wyth wodwos þat woned in þe knarrez". ("[warred] with dragons.. [and] wild men who dwelt among the crags")) this wild man (woodwose) has no relation to the Green Knight, but is just another enemy whom Sir Gawain happens to encounter in journey.

The Middle English word is first attested for the 1340s in the context of a decorative piece of art depicting a wild man, namely a piece of tapestry of the Great Wardrobe of Edward III, (Note: Quoted as "diasprez per totam campedinem cum wodewoses" from Wardrobe Acc. Edw. III (1).) (Note: The latinized term diasprez perhaps should be read as "diapered" meaning "embroidered" according to Warton, Thomas (1840) The history of English poetry; Wharton here also provides quoted Latin text, naming the source as Ex comp. J. Coke clerici, Provisor. Magn. Garderob. ab ann. xxi. Edw. III. de 23 membranis, ad ann. xxiii. memb. x.) but as a surname it is found as early as 1251, of one Robert de Wudewuse. The Middle English term wodewose meaning "wild man" is found embedded in the Anglo-Norman caption to a painting in the Taymouth Hours (14th century) (Note: Miniature scenes on 62r, 62v, 63r, 63v. The caption on 62v reads "Ce vient le wodewose et ravist l'un des damoyseles coillaunt des fleurs" (The wild man attempts to ravish the damsel, who clings to a tree).) (cf. § Manuscript illuminations).

There has been continued use in modern English for "woodwose, woodhouse", though now obsolete, displaced in modern usage by "wild man". The surnames Wodehouse or Woodhouse may derive straightforwardly from "house in the woods", or as a corruption of woodwose.

== Medieval literature ==
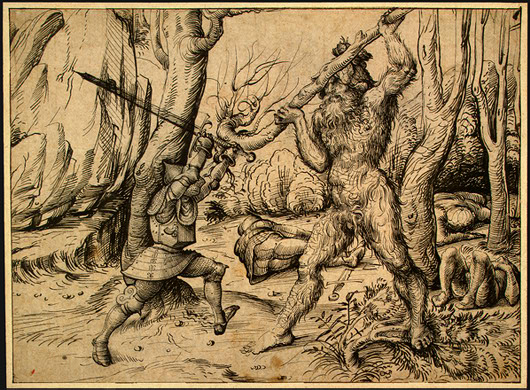
The Fight in the Forest, drawing by Hans Burgkmair, possibly of a scene from the Middle High German poem Sigenot, about Dietrich von Bern

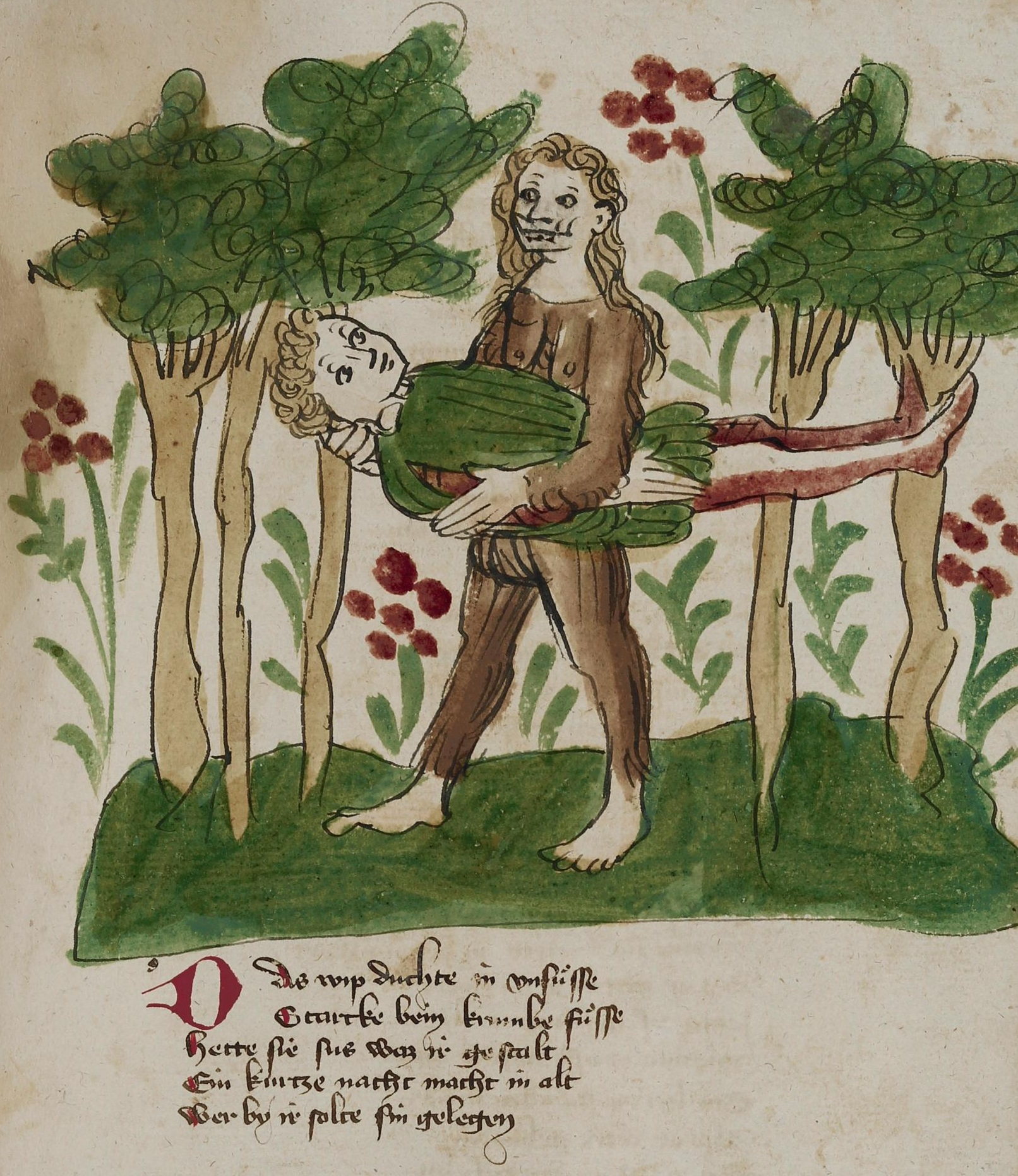
The fearsome Rûel (considered a wild woman) carrying off Wigalois

Verbal descriptions of the wild folk in medieval literature will be mainly discussed here. Visual depictions during the medieval period will be discussed under § Iconography.

=== German epic ===
That the German epic Sigenot (cf. image right) featuring both the giant named Sigenot and the wild man was certainly known in the 13th century, as the minnesinger Heinrich Frauenlob sings "Wa kam mit Parcivale /ris' Sigenot unt der wilde man? (Where came the giant Sigenot and the Wild Man, with Parzival?)", but the actual so-called elder Sigenot (13th century) is lost except in a fragmentary state, so the attestations come from the Younger Sigenot (15th century mss. and printed editions) as "wilde man, wild man.

The female character Rauhe Else ("Shaggy Else") in Wolfdietrich is also considered a wild woman example. She is a hairy woman crawling on all fours trying to get Wolfdietrich to marry her, but when he does not comply, casts a spell that turns him into a madman roaming the woods. God commands her to reverse the spell, and Wolfdietrich is now willing to marry her ("so long as the wild woman gets baptized"). Fortunately for Wolfdietrich, when she dips into a spring she sheds her furry skin and transforms into a beautiful maiden, now calling herself Sigeminne. (Note: Note that Grimm discusses "rauhe Els" under the Waldfrauen ("wood-wives") section (p. 433 of tr.), though he does not recognize her as a named character.) (Note: There is further complication of different recensions. Instead of shaggy Else who appears in Wolfdietrich B, a water spirit or mermaid (meerwîp, meerminne) appears in Wolfdietrich A.) She (Rauch Elss, christened Sygemin) is also mentioned as being the first wife of Wolfdietrich in the Anhang zum Heldenbuch.

In the Arthurian Wigamur there is the wildez wîp (wild woman) who dwells in a hole in a rock. In another Arthurian epic Wigalois, the dwarf named Karriôz is explicitly stated to have a wildez wîp as his mother. In Wigalois there also appears a monstrous female of the woods named Rûel (cf. image right) as an adversary to the title hero, and though she is also described as a "wild woman" by modern commentators, she is not to be confused with Karriôz's mother.

=== French epic ===
In the epic Renaud de Montauban, the title hero Renaud turns rebel against Charlemagne, and as fugitives living in the Ardennes forest, they have turned "black and hairy like a bear [on a chain]", (Note: Bernheimer's description is confusing, but in fact Renaud himself and his brothers, the Four Sons of Aymon, have taken on these bear-like characteristics (vv. 3234-3239) as well.) so that "neither stone nor rock could scathe" them. Renaud's band thus became chevalier sauvage ("savage knights") or wild men, in the sense that in medieval society, the outcast consigned to live in forests separating settlements were regarded as a sort of wild man.

The romance of Valentine and Orson, about a civilized brother separated from his bearlike brother Orson living in the wild, may count as an example of a wild man's tale, however, this might be more recognizable as a fictional treatment of the feral child.

=== Welsh and Irish literature ===
For the Myrddin Wyllt (mad Merlin) Suibhne Geilt (Mad Sweeney) driven to live in the wilderness and interpreted by some modern commentators as exhibiting the Wild Man of the Woods motif, cf. § Celtic mythology (under §Medieval parallels) below.

== Medieval to Renaissance transition ==
As the name implies, the main characteristic of the wild man is his wildness. Civilized people regarded wild men as beings of the wilderness, the antithesis of civilization. Such had been the medieval view through the High Middle Ages. That is to say, the wild man had been something that civilized people strove to reject.

The regard for the wild man as such an abominable fearsome character began to blunt, and by the 14th century in the example of the Bal des Sauvages held by King Charles VI of France (cf. § In dance and festival) the wild man was being employed in costume, not so much as embodiment of evil and savagery, but as a toything of court nobles.

The paradigm had reversed and the Wild Man became the Noble Savage by the time of Spenser's The Faerie Queene (1590, 1596) (Note: The character Sir Satyrane, a satyr's son cast in the role of a noble wild man. He ministers to a wounded knight using herbs, etc.) and Hans Sachs's Klag der wilden holtzleut uber die ungetrewen welt ("Lament of the Wild Men about the Unfaithful World", 1530) and it became an iconic model. (Note: Assessment that Sachs articulates the nobility of the wild man more clearly than the Englishman, Spenser, followed by details.) Bernheimer analyzes this as a backlash reaction by the nobility of having to live within the constraints of aristocratic conventions and chivalric code.

Although emergence of the concept of the "Noble Savage" (French: bon sauvage) had occurred post-discovery of the Americas, according to one observer not inconsistent with the foregoing 16th century examples, much of the scholarship on the Noble Savage pertains to thinking of the Enlightenment Period (18th century). The coinage of the term "noble savage" itself has often been (falsely) attributed to Jean-Jacques Rousseau, though refuted; as Rousseau never actually used that term himself, even though the philosopher did profusely use the construct of "savage" to critique various aspects of civilized society.

== Modern folklore ==
The purported nature of these wild folk or wood people in folklore, like the lore of demons in general, is highly ambiguous, unpredictable and mutable.

When the wild men appear in solitary fashion, they are similar to giants and ogres, while the women tend to be more goddess-like.

=== Physical characteristics ===
==== Giants or dwarfs ====
The wild people can be dwarfish or be gigantic in size. And this may not necessarily be regional variations: the wild folk of Bernhardswald (in Schlüchtern Hesse) are purported to be giants or dwarfs depending on the season. (Note: They walk high atop mountains and shake the treetops during stormy nights with flashes of lightning. They walk (as dwarfs) among the horsetails (de:Schachtelhalme) when the Arum (Aaronspflanze) are in bloom.)

Wildman subtypes/aliases such as the Fankkenmanli of the highest Alpine regions or the Orgen and noerglein (Nörglein) of Tyrol (called by names on the diminutive case) are usually conceived of as dwarfs. Similar to the Orgen are the Dorgi, Doggi of Switzerland and the Doggele of Alsace, all supposedly corruptions of the name Orc/Ogre.

They can be of different temperaments, but they may exact vengeance on those who are frightened by them (Note: HdA n25, citing Mannhardt (1904), 1: 111 Also Reiser cited below.) or mock them. (Note: HdA n26, citing Reiser Allgäu (145. Wilde Männle bei Hindelang, version 2) 1, 143–144.; Rochholz Schweizersagen; ZfdMythol. 3. 199., etc.) In that case, the smaller wild folk are more easily appeased, while the giant types will tear their tormentors apart (Note: HdA n28, citing Heyl (1897), p. 235, 49. Der wilde Mann zu Sulz.) or curse them with "seven times seven generations of curses and woe". (Note: HdA n29, citing Heyl (1897), pp. 240, 52. Von den lehten Heiden und wilden Männern auf dem Ritten (Part 2).)

Friedrich Ranke argues that the legends concerning the wild people in Central Germany became less frightening because the forests themselves shed much of their eeriness due to development and deforestation, so that only the low rolling hills remained. Thus in these regions, the folklore concerned the wild little folk of "harmless good nature". (Note: Ranke (1924), p. 184, German: "harmlose Gutmütigkeit".)

==== Attire ====
The wild man stereotypically carries an uprooted fir tree, (Note: Schwarz (1941), p. 971 at n46, citing Kuhn & Schwartz Nr. 211 "Kaiser Heinrich's Vogelheerd und der wilde Mann; Mannhardt (1904), I: 96, 105; Rochholz p. 319 Nr. 228; etc.) (Note: An additional source cited by HdA is Vonbun (1862) Beiträge pp. 46, 47, which explains the waldfänke and wilde mann to be synonymous, and featured on a Graubünden Bluzger coin holding a flag and uprooted fir. Whereas Vonbun (1889), p. 41 describes the Waldfenken-Geißler "whose staff was a whole fir tree (dessen Stab eine ganze Tanne war)".) or an iron club (Note: Schwarz (1941), p. 971 at n47, citing Mannhardt (1904), I: 96, 105, etc.) or an iron pole, (Note: Schwarz (1941), p. 971 at n48, citing Heyl (1897), p. 342 Nr. 15 "Der wilde Mann in Deutschnoßen" and p. 346 : "Eisenstange, lang wie ein Baum" also a hunting staff.) etc.

=== Alpine wild man ===
There are also the Alpine wild men recorded by modern folklorists, whose lore is generally found in the lore of Alps (mountainous Italian Tyrol, Valtellina and Italian and German-speaking parts of Grisons, Switzerland). The wild men of the Alps had the reputation of abducting women and devouring humans, particularly children. In Grisons, they are also accused of depositing their changeling child, swapping it with a human baby. Allegedly peasants in the Grisons tried to capture the wild man by getting him drunk and tying him up in hopes that he would give them his wisdom in exchange for freedom. This is noted as paralleling the capture of Silenus already described by Xenophon (d. 354 BCE), with Silenus being described as a satyr which Midas caught by getting him drunk with wine. (Note: The works of Ovid, Pausanias, and Claudius Aelianus also write of the motif of shepherds who caught a forest being (Faunus, etc.) in the same manner and for the same purpose.)

Legend also has it that humans were able to capture it once by getting it drunk, thereby learning the manufacture of cheese. (Note: And if they were able to detain him longer, would have learned how to make wax from milk. This motif of getting the wild man drunk to extract knowledge was seen above in the lore of the Grisons, with the Silenus parallel noted.) The Salvanel is also considered to be a thief of milk, but who has taught humans how to produce butter and cheese in return.

A legend from Folgrait (Folgaria) has it that a certain man heard the noise of the wild man hunting, and called out to him in rhymed couplet to give him a share, (Note: "Wilder Mann, Glück und Hual, / Pring mir auch mein Thual!" where Hual should be read as Heil ("hail, health") and Thual as Teil ("part, portion").) and received half a human corpse at his doorstep, subsequently having to take the trouble to have the hunter take back the unwanted gift. There are also variant versions with different rhymes from Ritten and Barbian. (Note: Zingerle (1859) No. 124. "Schahi Schaha".) (Note: Zingerle's tale No. 124 is cited by Schneller for comparison.) However, in a cognate tale from Vallarsa, the wild hunter is not specified as a "wild man". It is comparable to a similar wild hunter myth from Northern Germany, that if anyone calls out to heckle the hunt, the hunter forces a "half portion" (Halb Part) of foul-smelling game or human part, reciting a couplet that if you join in the hunt, you must help out with the chewing. (Note: Schwarz[Schwartz], p. 110 (recte p. 10). cited by Schneller.)

A legend held that Wildmannli dwelled in the Gross Windgällen mountain in the canton of Uri, Switzerland that disapproved of humans hunting on Sundays, and a hunter who breached the taboo and shot a chamois was turned to stone. (Note: "201. Das Wildmannli".) They were also styled Wildmandli, and according to another telling from the canto of Uri, these wild folk lived in areas called Ruosstalbalm (aka Heidenbalm) or Hornefeli in Isenthal. According to legend they provided chamois cheese that would grow back to size if not completely used up, but were driven away by advent of hunters who preyed on their chamois. They are said to have feet pointing backwards. (Note: "1335. Die wilden Leute in Isental".) Another tale from an informant of Isental told that a certain hunter had been promised by the Wildmandli he would be provided by a fresh buck every Saturday hung right as his door, in exchange for ceasing to hunt the chamois on his own. The hunter (which the informant insisted must have been an outsider, probably from the Canton of Nidwalden) broke the promise, and went hunting, and as punishment the man was bound up in white clothe by the Wildmandli and hurled down the cliff. (Note: "1336. Der Jäger und das Wildmandli", a).) According to lore, Wilde Mandl appear in high altitude regions of Tyrol, in the valleys of Ötztal, Stubaital, Zillertal, Tauerntal, and have spread to The Dolomites.

=== Alpine wild woman ===
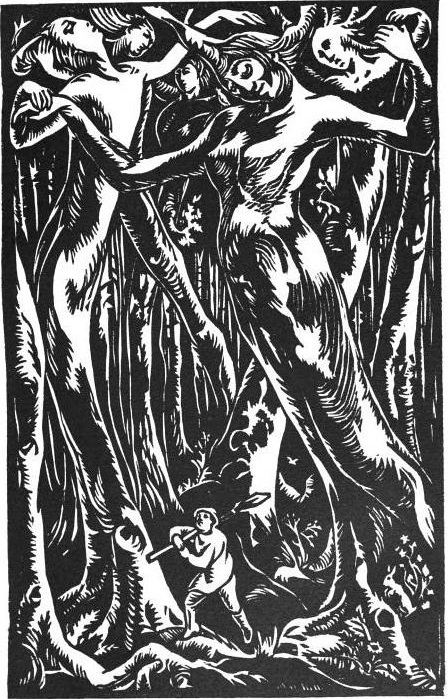
Wilde Frauen/Fräulein of the woods. —Woodcut by Maria Braun (1921)

Meanwhile, the Tyrolian and Swiss Fängge (Faengge, Fankke) as well as the Austrian Salige Frau are (subtypes or aliases of the) wild woman. (Note: As aforementioned, the wild women "identical to or closely related to" the Fänggen or Salige.)

The wild woman basically matches the female version of the wild man in appearance, and notably has drooping breasts (Note: HdA n59, citing ZfdMythol. 3. 199,) (for which the Tyrolean wild woman has earned the nickname Langtüttin) however, she may appear in the form of beautiful women.

The wild woman, the Fängge, and the Salige Frau are all associated with protecting alpine game, especially the chamois. (Note: Cf. Fänggen § General description and Salige Frau § Guardians of the chamois.) The legendary protectress called Kaiserfrau of Nachtberg (a peak situated between Thiersee and Brandenberg, Austria) is not explicitly called a wild woman in the original telling, (Note: Zingerle (1859) No. 46. "Die Kaiserfrau am Nachtberg" (collected in Kirchbühel, possibly Kirchbichl in Unterinntal).) but is classified as such. In the tale, the tall woman dressed in a green robe commands a shepherd to kill all poachers, otherwise she will destroy his entire flock. He obliges, and due to the reputation that the Kaiserfrau harms hunters, the stock of game in the forest rebounds.

The wild women of Styria, Austria were said to reside mostly on Mt. Schöckl. They have a hollow or trough (Note: he term muldenartige — Mulde is vague, meaning shallow container or trough, but historically it refers to a Backtrog or bread trough.)-like back (hence comparable to the skogsnuva of Sweden), so they can pretend to be old tree trunks instantly by turning their backs, even when a hiker senses the presence of the beautiful wild woman. The wild women of Schöckl are said to be hunted by the Wild Hunt that travels on flying sleds carrying demons. (Note: Cf. Salige Frau also said to be preyed on by the Wild Hunt.)

=== Central German wild folk ===
Some of the wild man lore around the Harz Mountain, Lower Saxony are associated with silver mining industry are discussed under § Numismatics below.

One folktale from Wilhelmsdorf, Thuringia tells of a Waldweibchen who dwelled with a peasant woman, and performed various chores of the maid, tending the fire, and baking the bread, but no sooner than delivering the baked loaves to their spot, the wood-womankin would be somewhere munching away at a fresh loaf. And if the peasant woman was boiling Knösse (dumplings) it would snatch away as much as half the pot when the woman turned her back. Finally the peasant woman could tolerate no more, and decided to "pip" (poke finger-holes in the dough) the entire lot (Mandel of 15) of bread and put caraway seeds in them, full knowing the forest spirited sang a little song indicating she abhorred that sort of bread. As expected, the pipped caraway bread disgusted the Waldweibchen which ran off, predicting ruin for the peasant woman, and surely enough, the woman's family became so poor they were wanting for any bread at all, seedless or otherwise. (Note: "212. Das Waldweibchen im Bauerhause zu Wilhelmsdorf", from Börner, W. (1838) Volkssagen aus dem Orlagau Volkssagen aus dem Orlagau, p. 188ff.)

=== Slavic folkore ===
Wild people of Russian folklore are called Russian: дикие (dikiye, lit. '"wild [ones"'; sing. дикий dikiy) or div'i (Russian: дивьи, дивы, plural only). The names derive from two related proto-Slavic roots *dik- and *div- that combine the meanings of "wild" and "amazing, strange". The latter (div- form) names especially are given to mythical forest creatures in the pan-Slavic folk demonology, and their cognates are Ukrainian: дивий (dyvyy); Bulgarian: див (div); Polish: dźiwy; Czech: divi; Slovak: diva žena, diva zona ("wild forest woman"); Moravian dialects: divížena (female) divižák (male). (Note: Valentsova (2019) is a useful source in English, but derives much of its info from Belova (1999), which is cited as SD=Slavjanskije drevnosti.) There is some latitude in the descriptions of this group, often close to the boginka of the West Slavs and vila of the South Slavs. (Note: It might be worth noting that a mythical pagan creature called Div which cries out an omen of doom in The Tale of Igor's Campaign is conceived of as bird.)

Wild people of the former (dik-) group are of somewhat different character. The wild man of this group are identifiable by such names as Дикарь, дикий, дикой (dikar, dikiy, dikoy) or дикенький мужичок, (dikenkiy muzhichok. "wild little fellow"), perhaps equitable or comparable to the leshy. In fact, dikar, dikoy, dikenkiy muzhichok are among the circumlocutions to refer to "leshy", which is taboo to name directly, according to ethnographer Dmitri Zelenin. This type according to the lore of the Saratov Oblast is a short man with a big beard and tail; which resembles the appearance of the Ukrainian лісови люди (lisovi lyudi) – old men with overgrown hair who give silver to those who rub their noses. These may also be compared to the дикий черт (dikiy chert, dikiy chort, "wild evil") of the Kostroma Oblast.

In the old Vyatka Governorate (now in Kirov Oblast) the диконький (dikonkiy) was an unclean spirit that causes paralysis; the Ukrainian лыхый дыв (lihiy div, "evil div") was a marsh spirit blamed for outbreaks of fever; the Ukrainian and Carpathian діка баба (transl|dika baba) was an evil seductress captivating men with her allure; she also wore seven-league boots, stealing children and drinking their blood, while leaving changelings behind. The Belarusians of the Vawkavysk district tell of the дзікія людзі (dzikija ľudz, "wild people") which are "single-eyed and large-eared, tailed mythical creatures that eat people" dwelling over the sea, while Belarusians of Sokolsky Uyezd (around Sokółka) similarly told of the дзикий народ (dzikij narod, "wild folk") living overseas who are covered in fur, have a long tail and ears like an ox, and cannot speak, but only squeal.

East Slavic folklore of these mythical beings often coincide with accounts of the дивии люди (divyi lyudi "wondrous folk") found in the medieval romance of Alexander the Great. Russians from the Ural region believe that the divyi lyudi are short, beautiful, have a pleasant voice, live in caves in the mountains, and can predict the future.

Among the Bohemian populace, the wild man is known as lesní muž (pl. lesní mužove, lit. 'forest man'), who abducts a girl to forcibly make her his married wife. The Bohemian wood woman (lesní panna; pl. panny) is also called or divý žena (var. divá žena pl. divé ženy). When she performs, her music is the storm song and her dance the whirlwind. According to one story, she abducted a girl who loved to dance, and danced with her from midday to sunset, three days in a row, but at the end of the ordeal, recompensed this girl by endowing her an inexhaustible supply of yarn. (Note: A motif seen with the moss woman, as Mannhardt points out. Cf. also the legend of the Salk under Salige Frau.) But had this dancing partner been a boy, the wood woman would have tickled him to death.

== Iconography ==
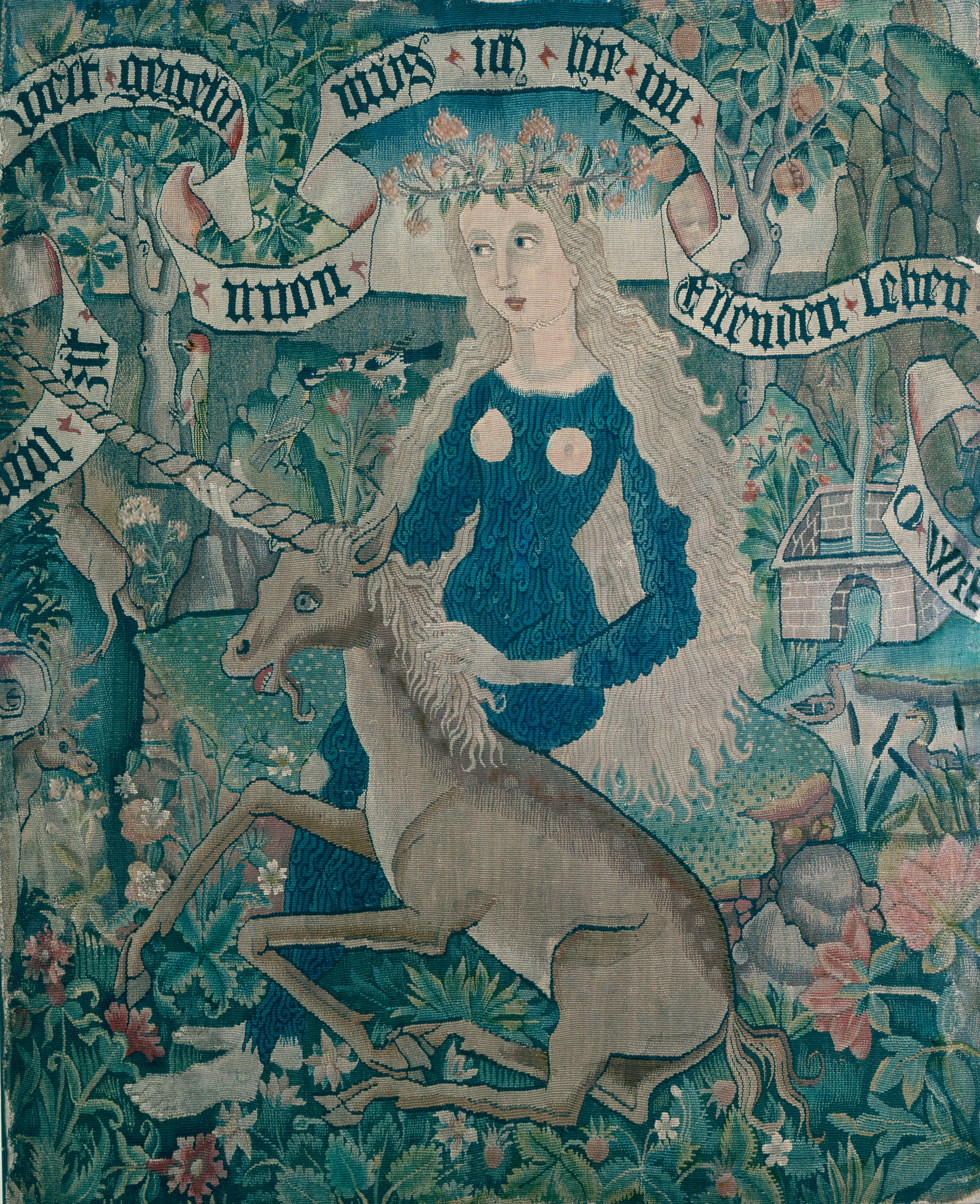
Wild woman with unicorn, tapestry c. 1500–1510 (Basel Historical Museum). (Note: Note she is hairy except around her breasts and knees, as according to wild woman defined by Bernheimer.)

In art, the wild man was depicted as completely covered with hair, except of the face, hands and feet; the wild woman likewise except her breasts were also stereotypically hairless (cf. fig. right). By the 12th century the wild folk were almost invariably described in this way, as hairy all over. To be more precise, the wild men were bearded but hairless above the chin, whereas the females bare-chinned (beardless) as well as having bared breasts.

Around the same 12th century, the conventions of hairiness came to be extended to certain legendary personages in mentally altered states. (Note: There was some basis to this according to the shifting medieval scholarship. While Isidore of Seville (d. 636) had explained mental states in terms of the well-known Four humors (melancholia caused by black bile), Arnaldus de Villa Nova (d. 1311) would state that while mania was caused by the humour of choler, it could exhibit symptoms of animal-like physical transformations, and indeed, the medieval lay-person of that period believed that madman assumed shaggy forms.) A prime example was the biblical Nebuchadnezzar II of Babylon who went mad and was no longer depicted as a smooth-bodied human but as a hairy creature. Other examples were ascetic saints (Note: Example of Saint John Chrysostom (died 407), described further below. Late medieval legends developed claiming he was overgrown with hair all over his body when recaptured.) (cf. § Christian parallels) or literary hermits such as the Merlin of the Welsh (cf. § Celtic mythology) or Arthurian Ywain who were overcome by a spell of madness or lovelorn dementia (cf. § Celtic mythology).

Bernheimer asserts that medieval paintings of Nebuchadnezzar came to be conventionally depicted as a wild man in crouching positions as according to contemporary ideas, even though that image contradicted the verbal biblical description in Daniel 4 (Book of Daniel, 2nd century BCE), which ascribed feather-like growths of hair like eagles, and bird-like claws.

The wild man was used as a symbol of mining in late medieval and Renaissance Germany. The town of Wildemann in the Upper Harz was founded during 1529 by miners; and the town was supposedly named after certain thieves discovered the wild man and wife clad in nothing but fir branches and moss living in the caves of a Harz mountain range. (For usage as heraldic devices in this town, this German mining area or elsewhere, cf. § Heraldry below.)

In costumery for dances and balls, this was simulated by wearing tights with numerous pieces of feathers or rags glued onto them (cf. Bal des Ardents) (Note: Cf. feather tights of angels) Masks in costumes were used to portray wild men in popular drama, also including the patrician mummers who participated in the Nuremberg Schembart Carnival (cf. § In dance and festival)

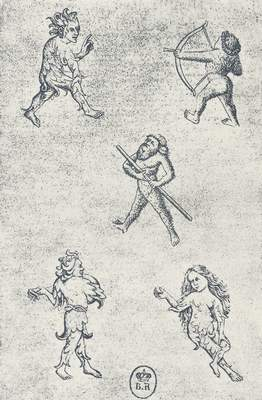
The Five of Wild Men, by the Master of the Playing Cards, before 1460

Some early sets of playing cards have a suit of Wild Men, including a pack engraved by the Master of the Playing Cards (active in the Rhineland c. 1430–1450), some of the earliest European engravings. A set of four miniatures on the estates of society by Jean Bourdichon of about 1500 includes a wild family, along with "poor", "artisan" and "rich" ones.

=== In medieval art ===
==== Manuscript illuminations ====
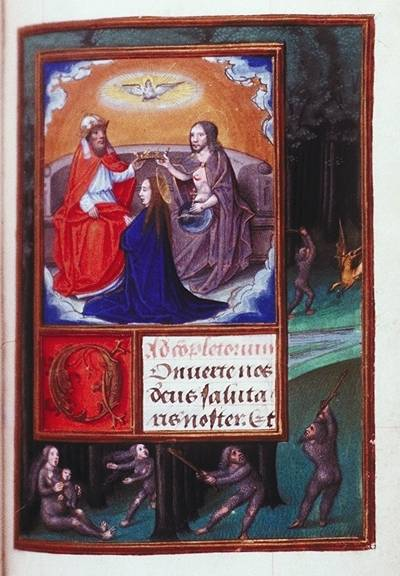
Wild people, in the margins of Book of Hours (ca. 1510-1520) —Syracuse University Library ms. 7 in Latin, f.104v

The wild folk are featured in the marginal paintings (drollery) in a number of illuminated manuscripts. There are wild men and women painted in the narrative border around the miniature of the Coronation of the Blessed Virgin Mary in the Book of hours at Syracuse University Library (cf. fig. left).

In the Taymouth Hours (14th century), there are a series of miniatures (bas-de-page illustrations) recounting a story of a wild man abducting a maiden. Though the captions in this work are written in Anglo-Norman French, the wild man is called wodewose, which is a Middle English term.

There is also the drollery of a wild man being baited by three dogs, in the Queen Mary Psalter (14th century). (Note: Queen Mary Psalter (British Library Royal 2 B VII), fol. 173 r.)

==== Murals ====
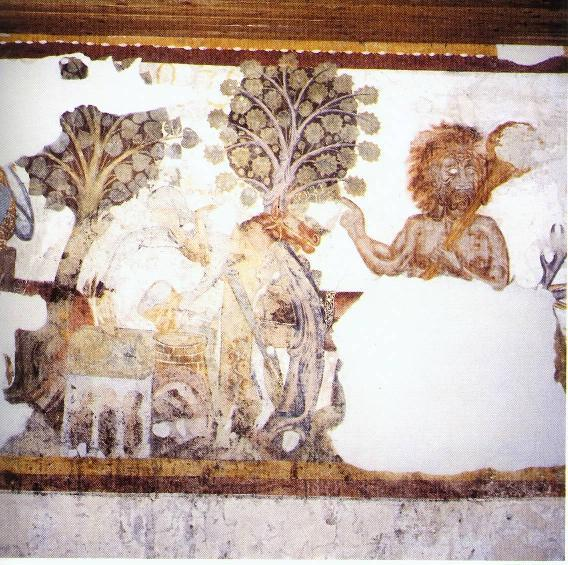
The "man of the woods" (wild herdsman) from Iwein (13th century) —Rodenegg Castle mural.

The herdsman character who is only a mere peasant (vilain) in Chrétien's Old French Yvain, the Knight of the Lion (though described as a "wild man" in modern scholarship) is literally a wild man (waltman, "man of the woods") in Hartmann's Middle High German Iwein. The wild herdsman is depicted as a club-carrying wild man on one of the early 13th century fresco murals of the Iwein cycle at Rodenegg Castle (Castello di Rodengo) in South Tyrol (cf. image right). The wild man is similarly painted on the mural at Schmalkalden Castle (Wilhelmsburg Castle). The man wears a skin with two paws attached to it, perhaps the influence of the Greek hero Hercules (wearing the lion skin).

There is a giantess room series among the Runkelstein Castle (Castel Roncolo) fresco murals, and the label "Fraw Riel" suggests identification with the female Rûel of Wigalois (mentioned above as being categorized as wild woman by some modern commentators). (Note: However, the fresco has this giantess holding Nagelring (Dietrich von Bern's sword) thus some confounding of names is involved.) The Runkelstein frescos are themed on a set of triads: three heroes, three giantesses, three giants, etc. The giant Schrutan is one of them, who figures in the epic Rosengarten zu Worms as one of the single combat participants. (Note: Schrûtân is killed by Heime. Schrûtân is also uncle to a pair of giants named Ortwîn (4) and Pûsolt) Although clad in knightly armor, he holds an uprooted tree, and the Schrutan in this painting is "encoded as a giant-wild man hybrid" according to one art critic.

==== Engravings ====
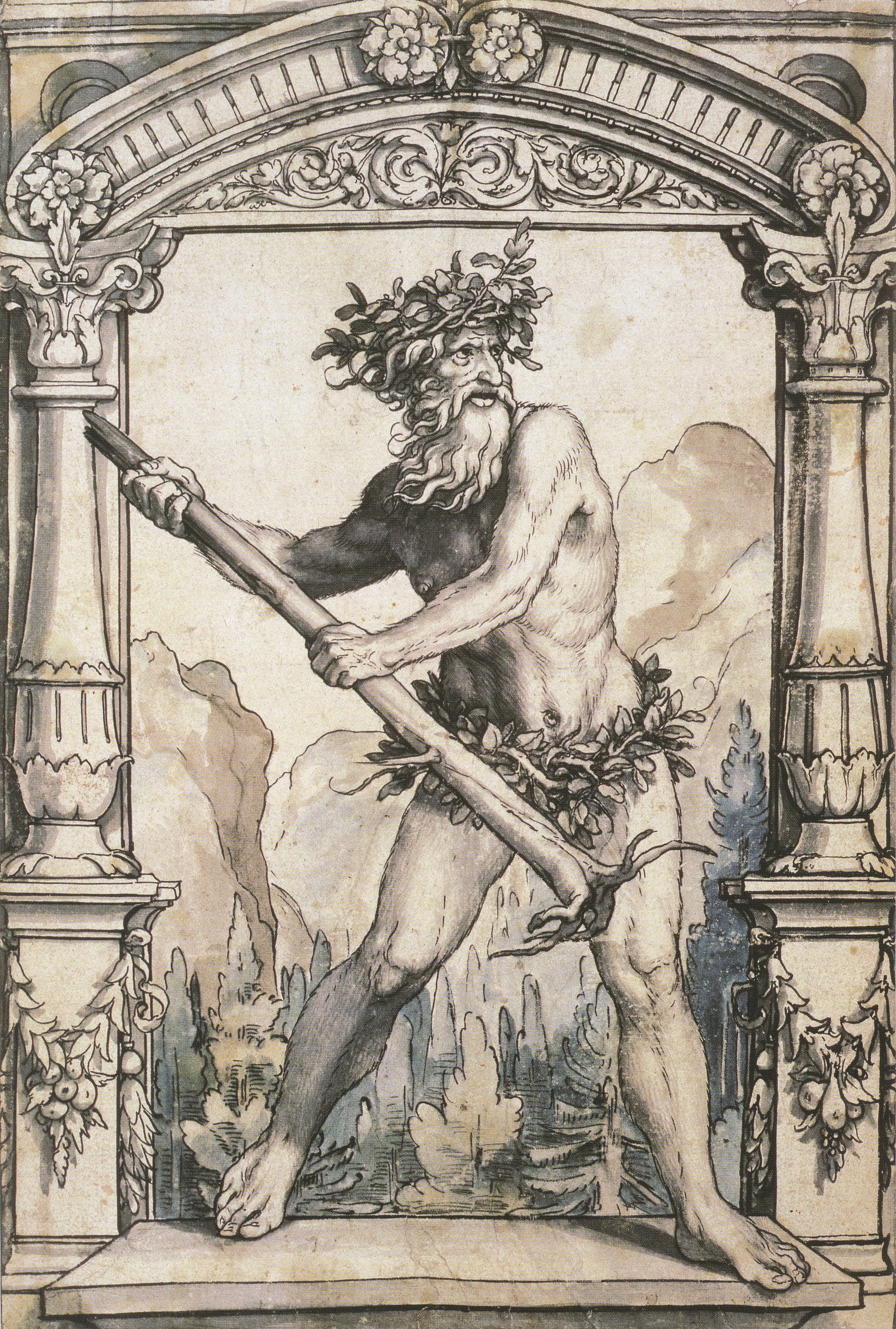
Classicized Wild Man design for a stained-glass window, studio of Hans Holbein the Younger, c. 1525–1528 (British Museum)

Albrecht Dürer depicts the wild man pursuing the maiden in his "Coat of Arms of Death" (1503), of which it is commented that the wild man springs to life from the conventional immobile role as shield-bearer of heraldic device (cf. also another of his work discussed under § Wild Men as shield-bearer below).

==== English examples ====
A carved image of a group of wild men (woodwoses) engaged in battle with a beast form a roof boss in Canterbury Cathedral, and is grouped among a number of Green Man bosses present in the cathedral. (Note: The scene appears to be one of either a hunt or a baiting. Charles John Philip Cave reporting on animal themes in roof bosses reports that "bull-baiting is in the nave aisle at Winchester Cathedral; in the Canterbury cloisters a bull is tossing a wild man".) There is also a furry wild man depicted in the crypt of the Canterbury Cathedral. (Note: Bernheimer guesses this might be a depiction of the Ichthyophagi from the Alexander Romance.) The visual artistic depictions of the English wild man (woodwose) and the green man merged during the Middle Ages to form a single type.

==== Classical influences ====
There are instances where medieval depiction of satyr or faunus lose their beastly traits (hooves and horns), turning into creatures not so far apart from wild men.

Medieval myth and art also adopted a convention of depicting the Greek hero Heracles, clad in lion skin and carrying a club as a wild man, sometimes of a more conventional type (Note: Hercules as a wild man, illustrated in a manuscript containing poems by Robert de Blois (fl. second third of the 13th century. ).) or more outlandishly as a tailed monster with clawed feet. (Note: 14th century illuminated manuscript of Seneca's Hercules Furens.) (e.g. painting at Schmalkalden, described above)

==== Gallery ====
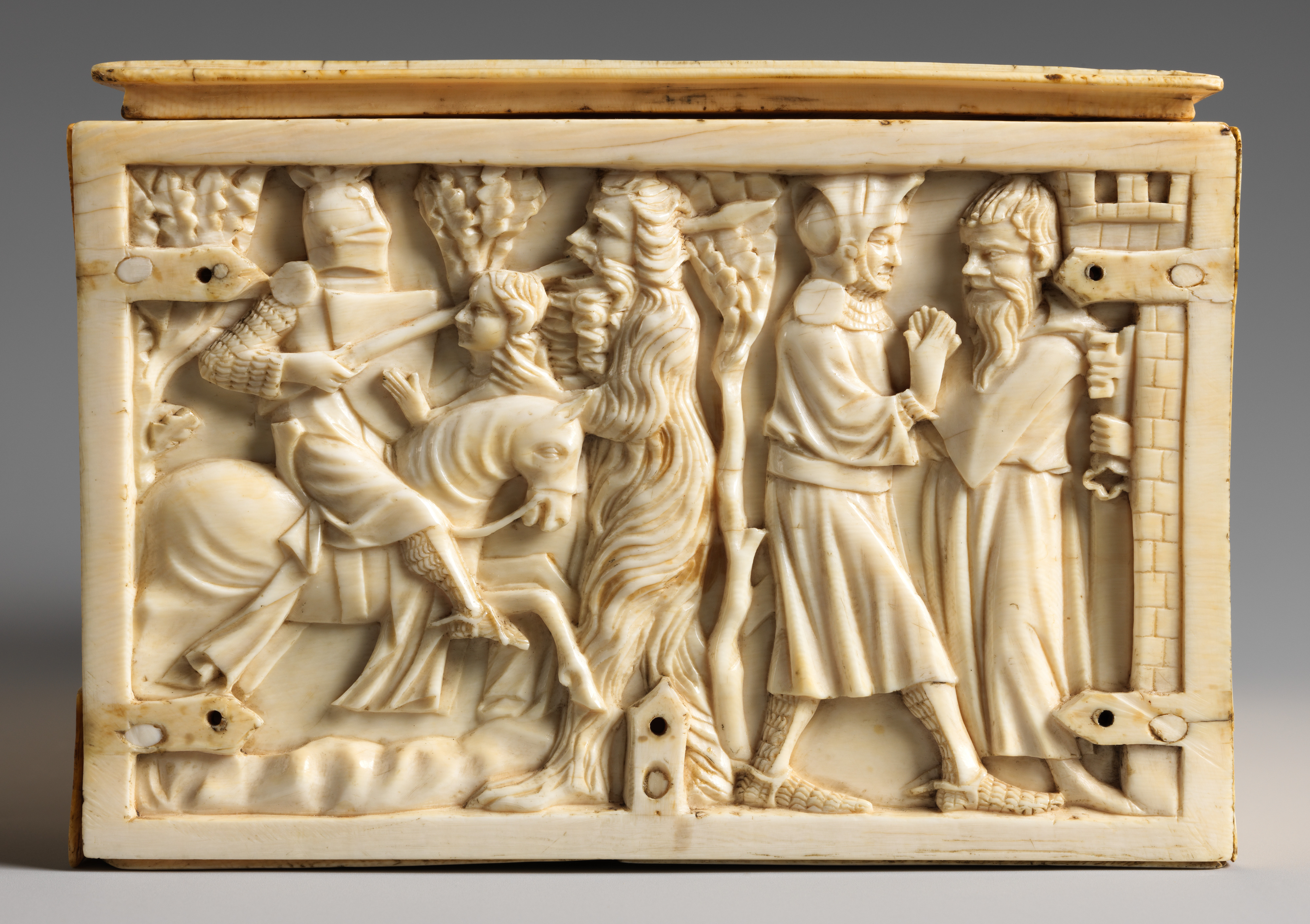
Knight saving a woman from a wild man, ivory casket, 14th century

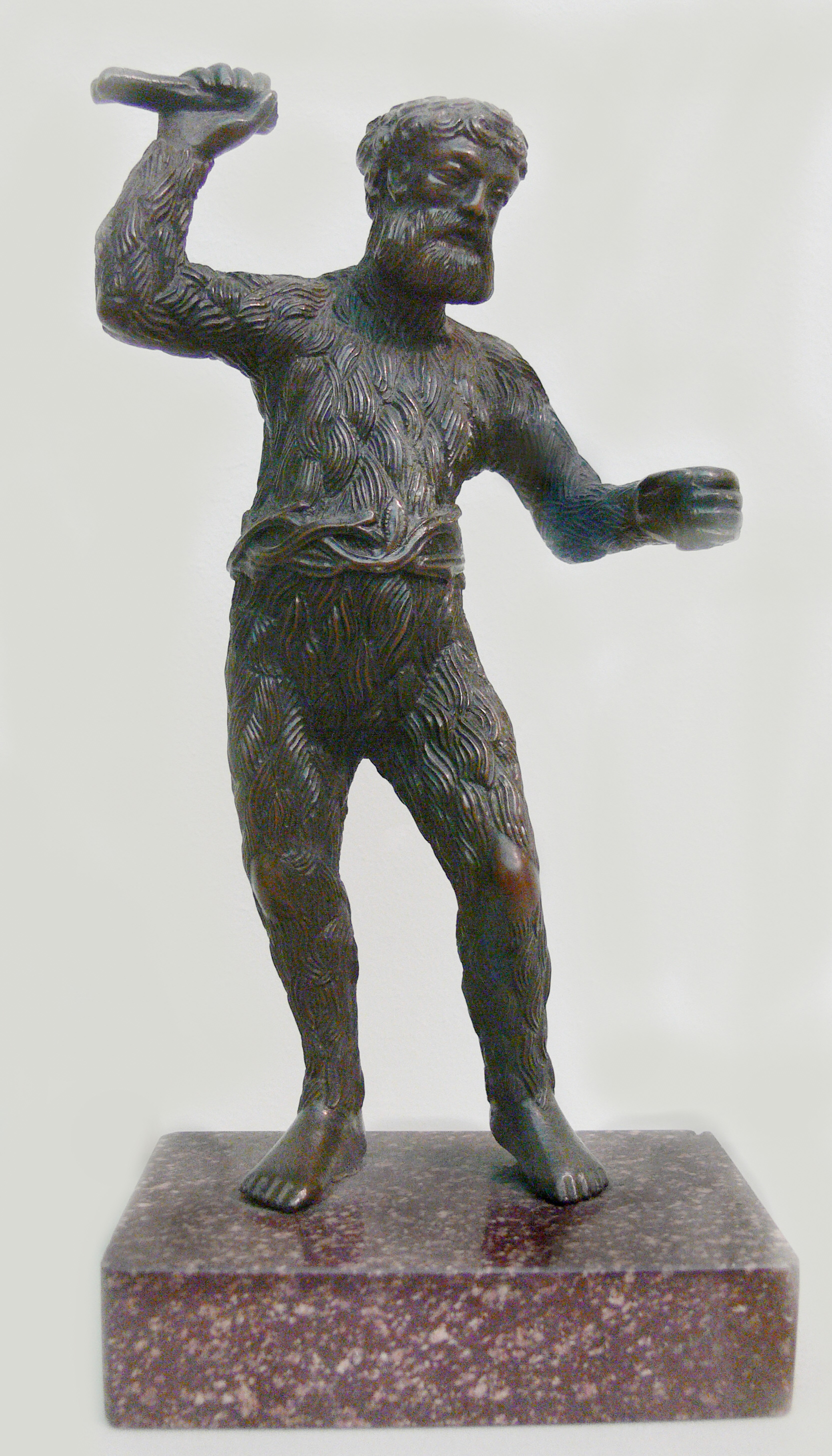
"Wild Man", c. 1521/22, bronze by Paulus Vischer

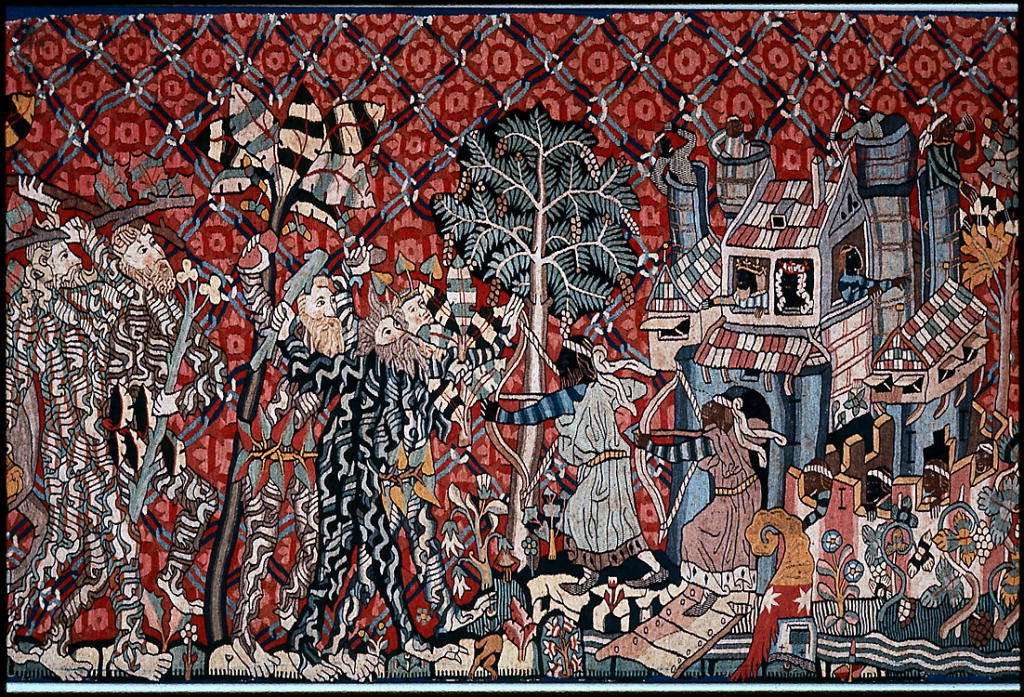
Tapestry: Wild Men and Moors, c. 1440 (Museum of Fine Arts Boston)

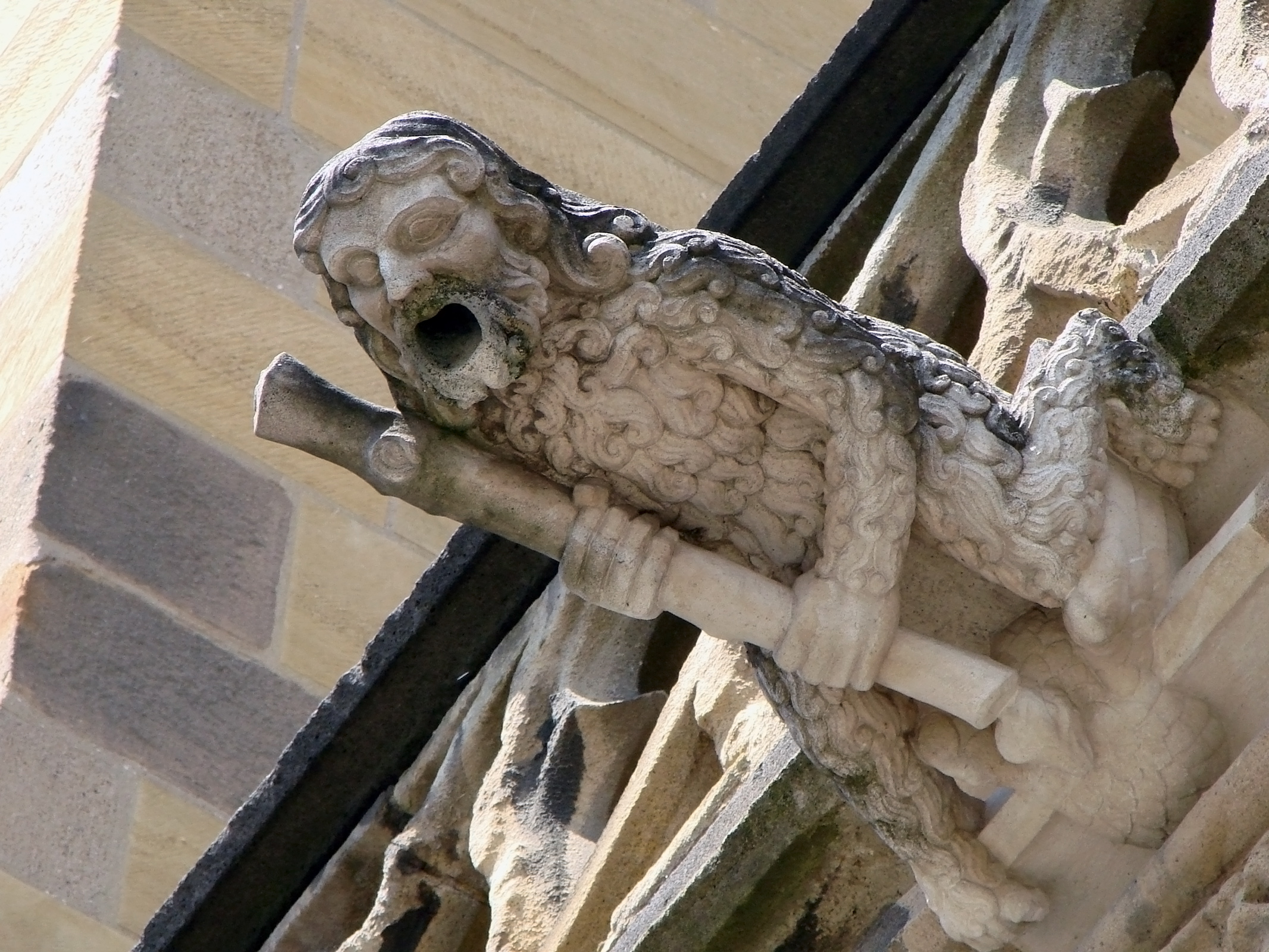
Gargoyle, Moulins Cathedral

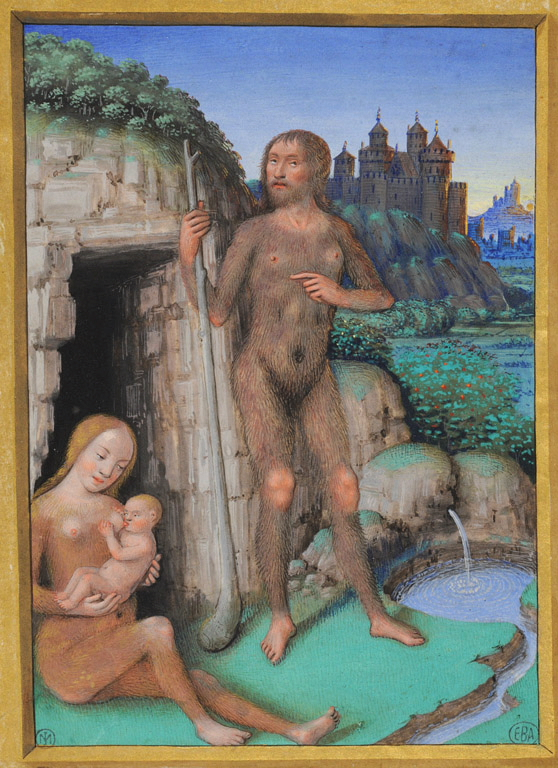
Wild family, miniature by Jean Bourdichon, from a set showing The Four States of Society

== Heraldry ==
=== Wild Men as shield-bearer ===
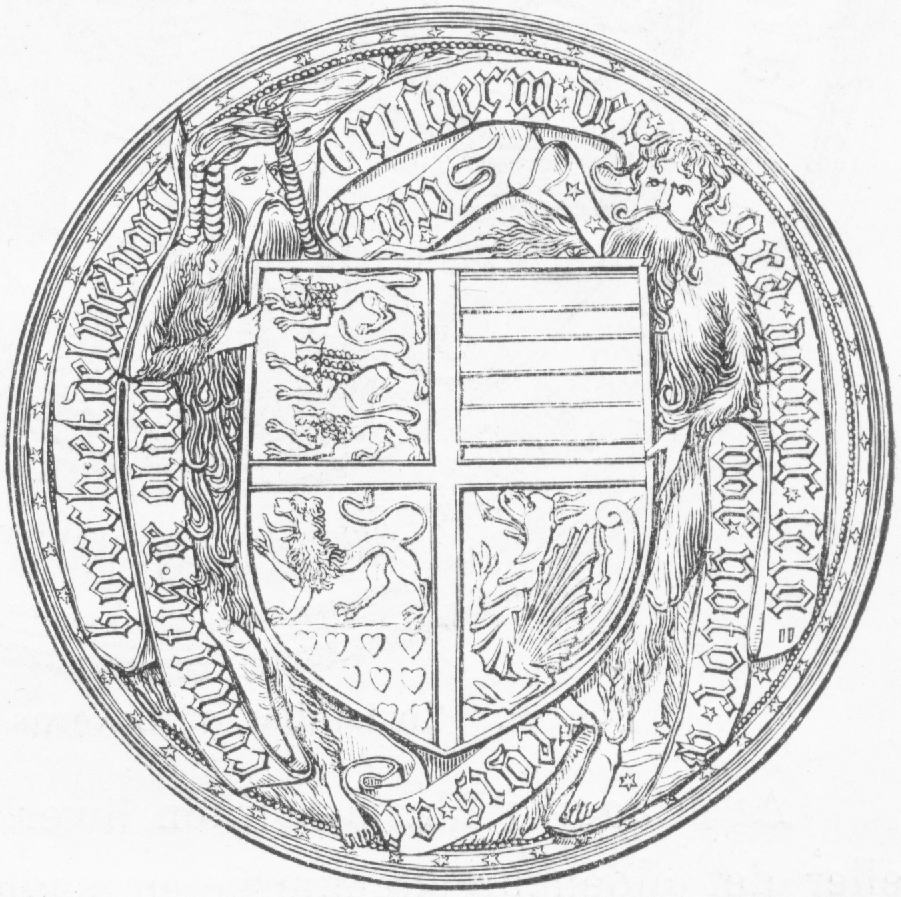
An early example of the wild man acting as an heraldic supporter appears in the seal of Christian I of Denmark (1449)

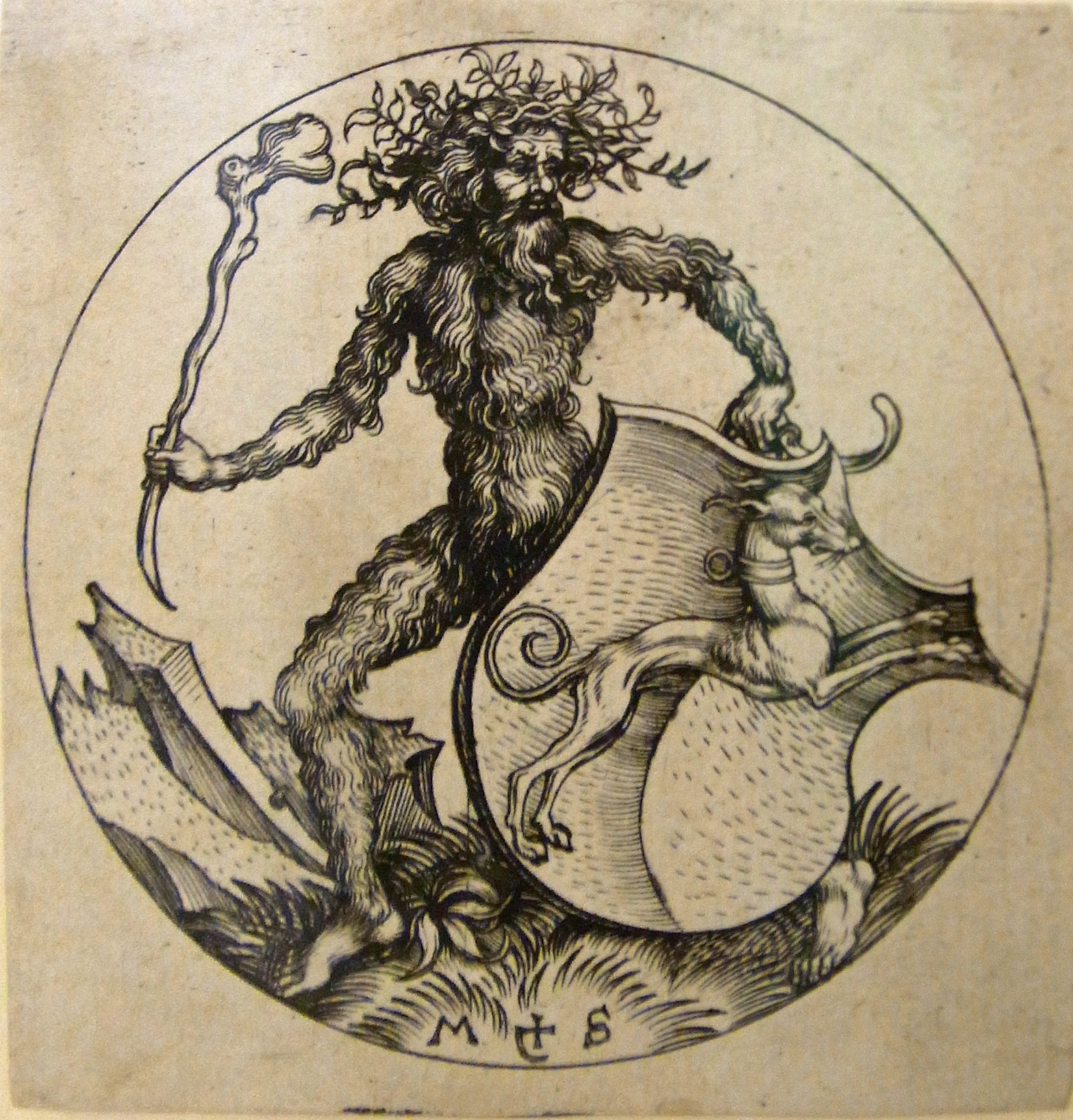
Martin Schongauer engraving, Shield with a Greyhound, 1480s.

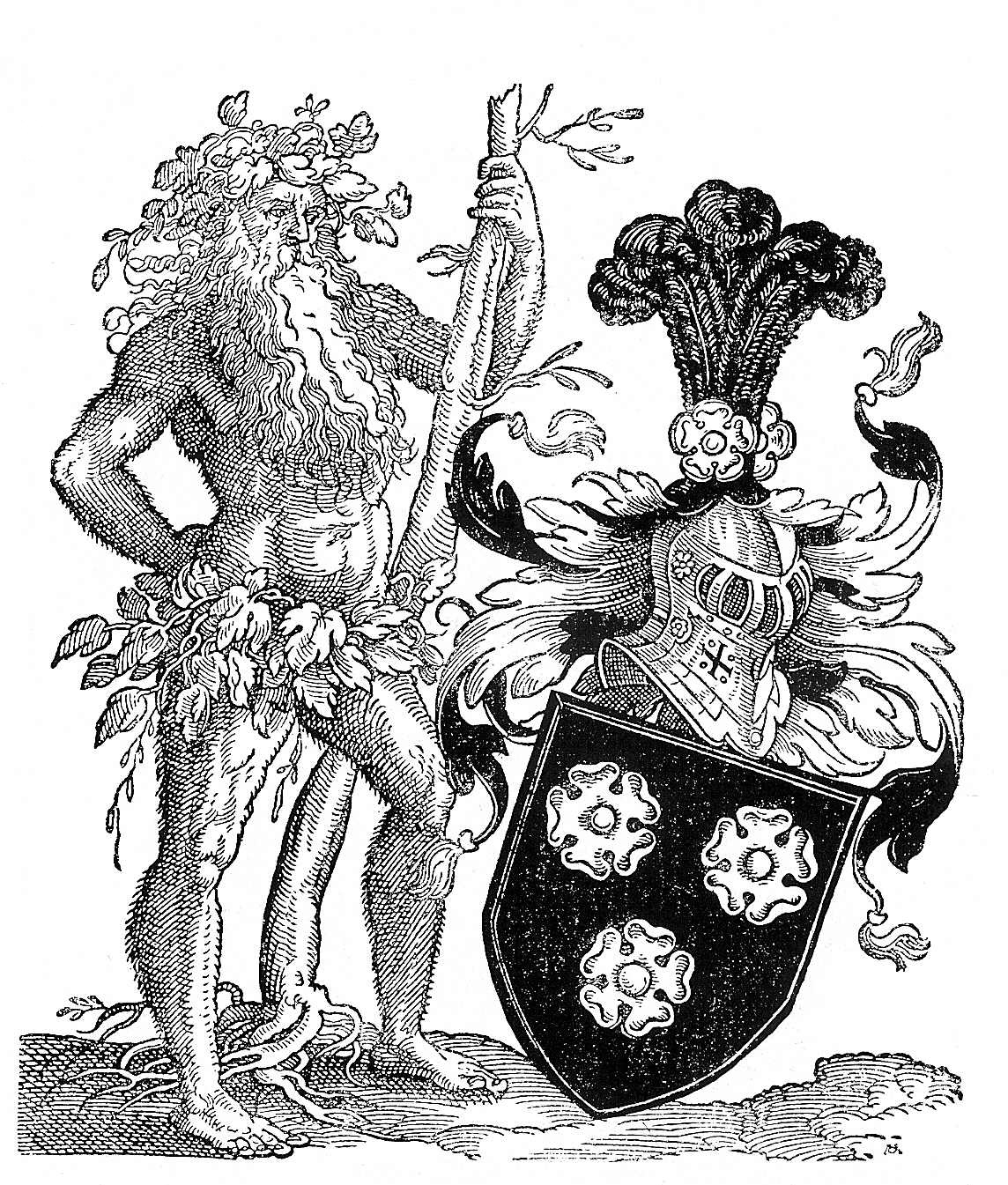
Wild-man supporter from 1589 (arms of the Holzhausen family)

By the second half of the fifteen century, it became widely conventional to have engravings made of a wild man holding up a shield (escutcheon) bearing the family's coat of arms (cf. images left). Particular examples include the Princes of Brunswick-Wolfenbüttel (cf. also § Numismatics below) and later by the royals of Brandenburg–Prussia.

To avail themselves to this needs, the engravers came up with the idea of having a prototype or template at hand of a wild man holding up a blank shield, so that the proper emblem can be filled in to cater to the particular patron. Martin Schongauer was one such engraver, four heraldic shield engravings of the 1480s which depict wild men holding heraldic shield (emblems of moor, greyhound, stag, and lion). (Note: Each image is confined within an approximately 78 mm circular composition which is not new to Schongauer's oeuvre. In Wild Man Holding a Shield with a Hare and a Shield with a Moor's Head, the wild man holds two parallel shields, which seem to project from the groin of the central figure. The wild man supports the weight of the shields on two cliffs. The hair on the apex of the wild man's head is adorned with twigs which project outward; as if to make a halo. The wild man does not look directly at the viewer; in fact, he looks down somberly toward the bottom right region of his circular frame. His somber look is reminiscent of that of an animal trapped in a zoo as if to suggest that he is upset to have been tamed. There is a stark contrast between the first print and Shield with a Greyhound, held by a Wild Man as this figure stands much more confidently. Holding a bludgeon, he looks past the shield and off into the distance while wearing a crown of vines. In Schongauer's third print, Shield with Stag Held by Wild Man, the figure grasps his bludgeon like a walking stick and steps in the same direction as the stag. He too wears a crown of vines, which trail behind into the wind toward a jagged mountaintop. In his fourth print, Wild Woman Holding a Shield with a Lion's Head, Schongauer depicts a different kind of scene. This scene is more intimate. The image depicts a wild woman sitting on a stump with her suckling offspring at her breast. While the woman's body is covered in hair her face is left bare. She also wears a crown of vines. Then, compared to the other wild men, the wild woman is noticeably disproportionate. Finally, each print is visually strong enough to stand alone as individual scenes, but when lined up it seems as if they were stamped out of a continuous scene with a circular die.)

Dürer in his Portrait of Oswald Krell (1499) drew two wild men supporting family heraldic shields. The one on the left wears a green garment made of moss, the one on the right is hairy all over (see image at top of page).

The wild man appears in the coats of arms of e.g. Naila and of the aforementioned town of Wildemann.

The coat of arms of the city of Lappeenranta, Finland features the "wild man"; since the Swedish name of the city Villmanstrand (Note: Originally spelled as Viltmanstrand) stood for ("Vildman strand", i.e., "wildman's strand"). (Note: An example of a canting arms which visually hints at the name of its owner.)

Coat of arms of the Finnish historical province, Lapland

Coat of arms of the Swedish province, Lapland

The city of Antwerp introduced supporters for its coat of arms during 1881, with a "wild woman" and a wild man

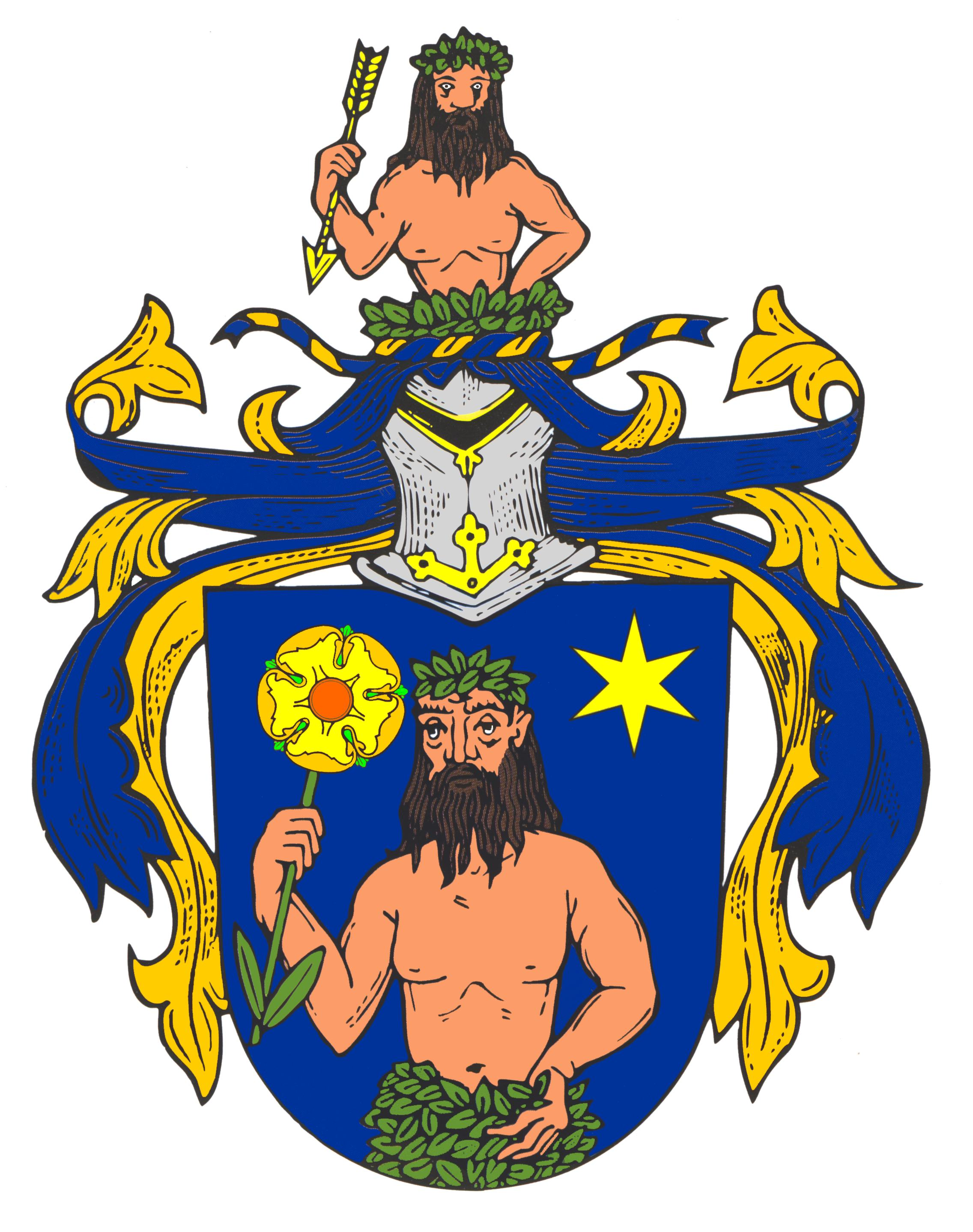
Arms of Kostelec nad Černými lesy, Central Bohemia

The German Glücksburg dynasty adopted Heracles into its coat-of-arms in 1863 when they became the royal family of Greece; the stylization of Heracles following the common usage of "wild man" in heraldry all over Europe.

Coat of arms of the Dutch municipality of 's-Hertogenbosch (den Bosch), capital of the province of North Brabant

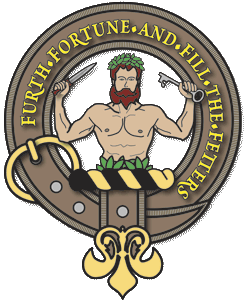
Half-figure of a wild man or "demi-savage", on crest of Scottish clan Murray (Duke of Atholl)

=== Numismatics ===
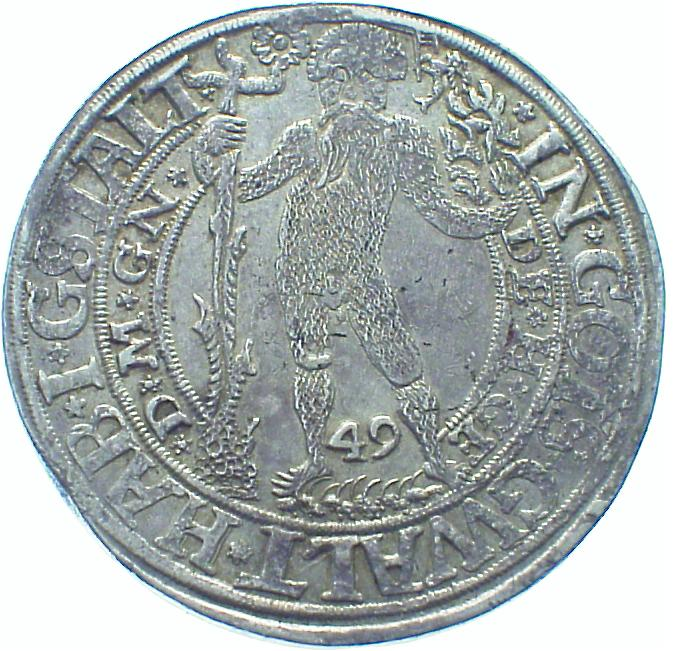
Henry the Younger's wild man taler, 1549 mintage.

The so-called Wildemannstaler was a type of taler (thaler, "dollar") denomination coins featuring a standing wild man on the reverse, first struck by Duke Henry the Younger of Brunswick-Wolfenbüttel in 1539, using the silver mined from the Upper Harz mountains. Thus, much of this wild man is really part of silver-mining folklore, rather than alpine or forest region folklore. The standing wild man on the early coin (and some heraldic illustrations) depicts a wild man holding a club (uprooted tree) and a clump of burning flame in the other hand (cf. photo right). The folkloric explanation of the flame is that it represents a light source or beacon of light to guide humans through the dark mine tunnels to the ore source or silver vein, as clarified by the work of Gerhard Heilfurth and Ina-Maria Greverus (1967). Heilfurth regards the wild man in this context to be a type of Berggeist or "mountain spirit" (which is really a generic term or class used by modern folklorists), better known as Bergmönch or "mountain monk" in the folklore of the Harz mountains. The explanation of the "monk" name comes from the historical fact that the neighboring Walkenried Monastery held control of the workings of the Harz mining operation at one time.

The lore of the mining spirit type wild man (or the Bergmönch) was localized mainly in the Harz and the Ore Mountains. The folklore is attested in the following piece of 16th-century writing, which stated that in the community of Wildemann (town named after "wild man"):

helt man dafür, daß daß Closter von Walckenred sonderlichen den Wildemanner Zog inne gehabt, beleget vnd gebawet hat, weil sich der Daemon Metallicus, der Bergteuffel, den die Bergleut daß Berg Mänlein nennen, in einer gestalt eines großen Mönchs hat sehen laßen, fürnemlich auff der Zechen Wildemann, da viel guter leute denselbigen gesehen, auch offtmals großen schaden gethan vnd angericht.
(It is believed that the Walkenried Monastery held, occupied, and built upon the Wildemann mine in particular, since the Daemon Metallicus or mountain devil, whom the miners call the "mountain manikin" (Bergmännlein, i.e. gnome), appeared in the form of a large monk, especially at the Wildemann mine, where many good people saw him, and he often caused great damage and destruction.

— Hardanus Hake, parish priest of Wildemann, in Bergchronik (1583)

There is also the political and polemical interpretation of the wild man and flame emblem, namely, Henry the Younger was insinuating threat of violence, even the burning down of townships. When Henry's less quarrelsome son Julius succeeded as duke, the flame on the coin was replaced by a candle or taper, and these coins are known as the Lichttaler or "Light taler" among numismatists. Later, Julius added other objects, the skull, the hourglass, and eyeglasses to the composition.

== In dance and festival ==
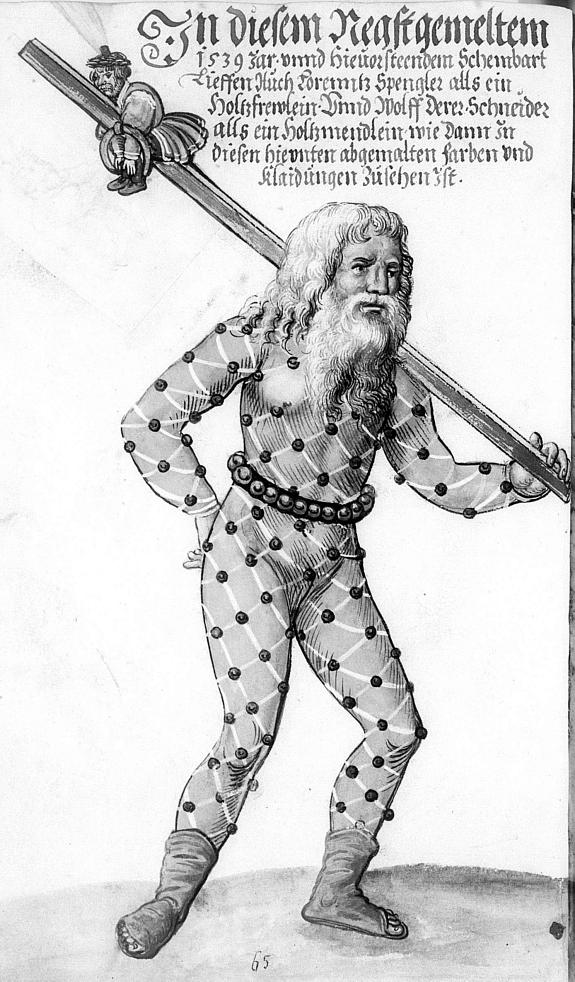
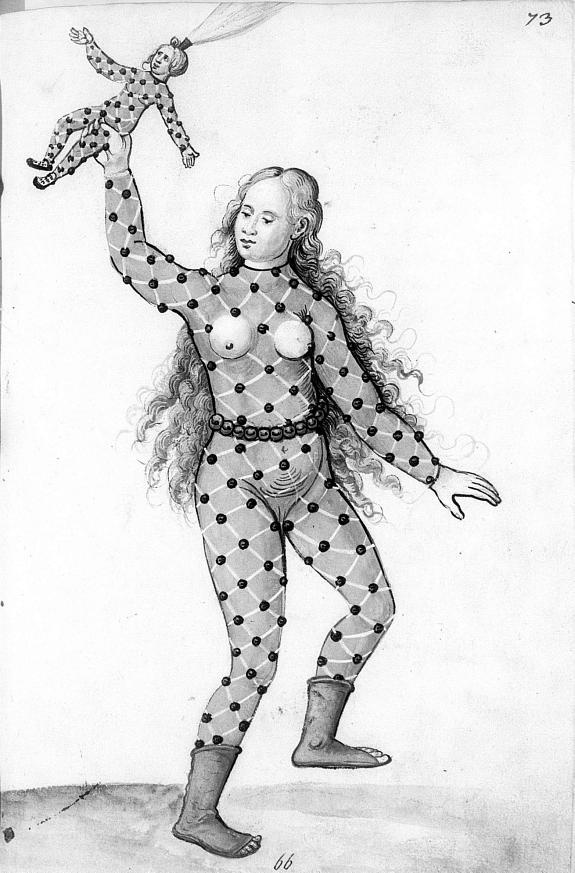
Wild man and wild woman of the Schembart Carnival of Nuremberg, From a 16th century manuscript.

Aspects of German folk traditions about the wild man were preserved in performances of Wildemannspiel ("wild man play") and Wildemanntanz (dance), which tended to be held during Shrovetide/Carnival season.

In the Morgestraich of the Carnival of Basel a wild man would take the first dance alongside other masked figures; this wild man held an uprooted tree in hand, and was entwined with leaves around the head and loins. There is a 1435 account of the wild man dance in Basel featuring 23 such wild men (uomini selvatici).

In the 15th century Fastnachtspiel (carnival play) "Ein spil von holzmennern", two men of the woods quibble over the female (holzweip) of their kind. The Wildemannspiel has been traditionally performed in Etschland (Etschtal), (Note: Italian: Val d'Adige.) Ulten, (Note: Italian: Ultimo.) and Vinschgau in South Tyrol. (Note: Mannhardt (1904), I: 333, reworded from Zingerle (1871), who gives "Burggrafenamt" and Vinschgau.). An example given of the Wildemannspiel conducted at Marling in South Tyrol: a youth and two younger boys are dressed up in beard moss hair with a jangling chain of snail shells and holding a young tree as staff, they waited in a cave towards St. Felix and dressed up schoolgirls were tasked to enter the forest and find the three of them. (Note: Mannhardt (1904), I: 333 after Zingerle (1855), pp. 200ff)

More examples come from civic celebrations or processions. At the Schembart Carnival (Schembartlaufen) of Nuremberg there were participants (German: Läufer lit. 'runners' (Note: Informally called "mummers" by Bernheimer; "mummer's play" in German is Mummenschanz, which is glossed as a synonym of the Schembartlaufen.)) dressed up as wild men (Holtzmendlein) holding up a dwarf (on a stick) as captive, together with a wild woman (Holtzfrewlein) (cf. image right). (Note: Cf. illustrations of participants of Schembart from a 16th century codex.) The bare-breasted "Wild Woman" in the procession was likely impersonated by a man. (Note: As to the "Wildman's mate", Sumberg comments "There is no indication as to whether the guiser was really a woman, but it is not likely: we have seen that a female disguise was often worn by men. The Wild Woman is also covered with moss, except for her breasts, stomach, elbows, knees, and hands; a white cap fits tightly over her head, allowing no hair to be seen".) The Wild Woman may also throw her "baby" (a doll) into the crowd, and this is meant as a gesture of bestowing fertility (performer can retrieve the doll by tugging on the string tied to it, so that this schtick can be repeated).

In Swiss locales of Vitznau, Weggis, Gersau, and Küssnacht, there is the Schämeler or Tschämeler (dialect name for a "schemer" "disguiser" etc.) who enacts the wild man, i.e., the local folk dressing up using moss, bark, leaves, etc. and holding a whole tree as staff.

Outside of German-speaking regions, the (magnus) ludus de homine salvatico, a large-scale Pentecostal play about the wild man was put on in Padua, Italy in the year 1208 and 1224; not much is known about these except they featured giants (gigantibus). Another ludus was held in the canton of Aargau, Switzerland in 1399.

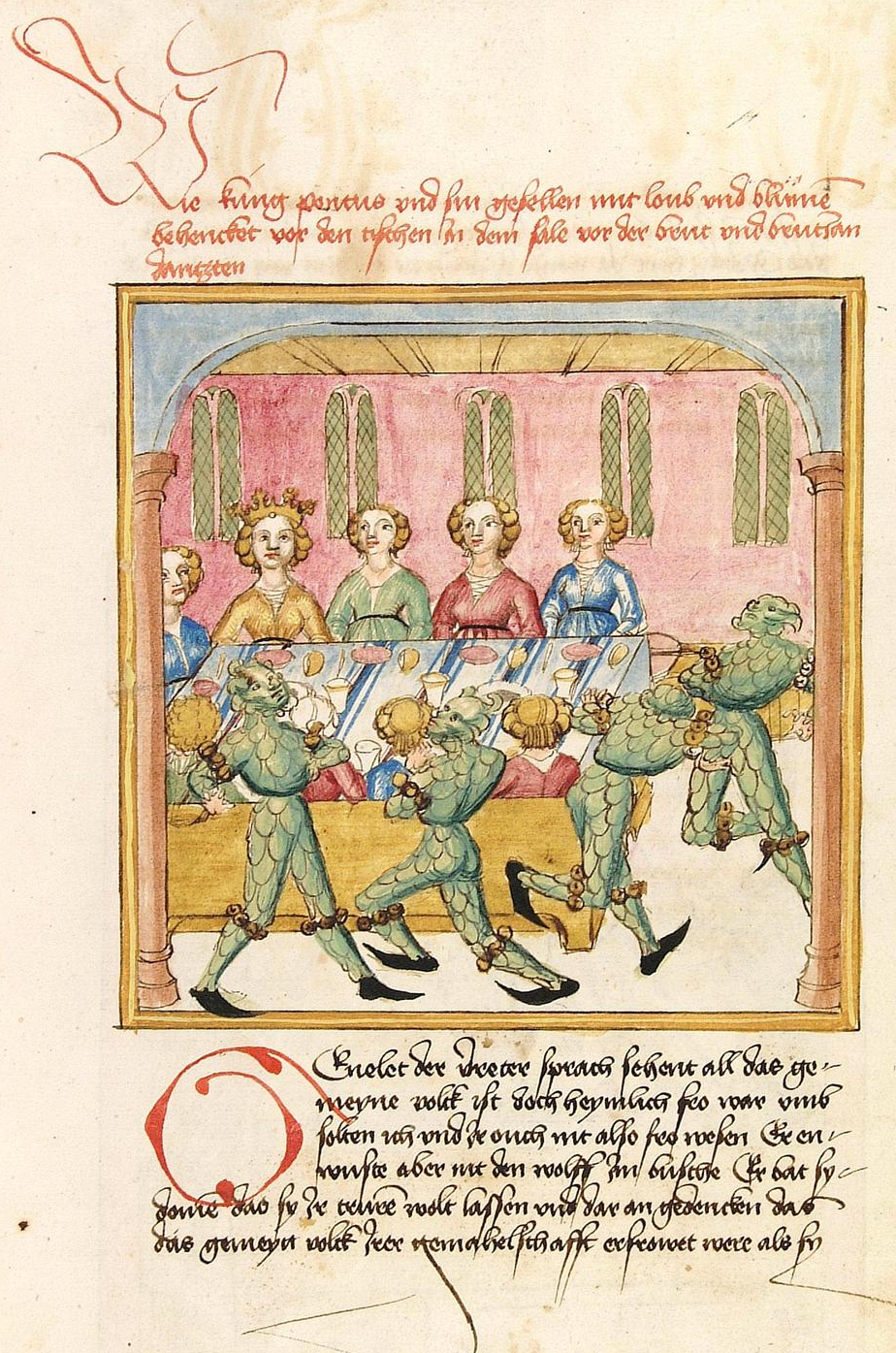
Pontus and his train disguised as wild men at the wedding of Genelet and Sidonia. ―Illustration of a manuscript of a German version of Pontus and Sidonia (Heidelberg University CPG 142, fol. 122r, c. 1475)

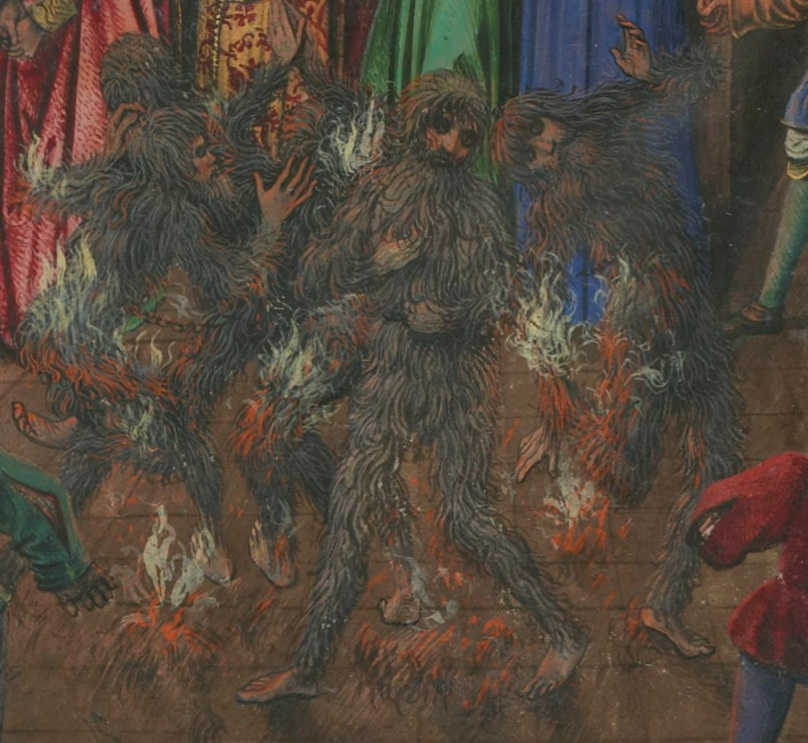
Dancers dressed up as wild men who caught fire. ―Detail of Bal des Ardents by the Master of Anthony of Burgundy (c. 1470s)

It also became fashionable at one time for participants in the carousels at court festivals to dress up as club-carrying wild men (cf. image right).

King Charles VI of France and five of his courtiers were dressed as wild men and chained together for a masquerade at the tragic Bal des Ardents (Bal des Sauvages) which occurred in Paris at the Hôtel Saint-Pol, 28 January 1393 (cf. image left). They were suited up "six quilts of fabric coated with pitch then stuck with flax (linen) fibers in the form and shape of hair", making themselves out to be "hommes sauvages, covered in hair from head right up to the soles of their feet". (Note: Froissart, "six coittes de toile.. enduites de poix..couverts de délie lin en forme et couler de cheveux, etc." quoted by Eiseler. Other sources use the phrase "flax tow" or just "tow", while Barbara Tuchman has altered flax/linen to "frazzled hemp", and Eustace gave "strips of hemp".) A careless torch set the costumers aflame, and all but one of the courtiers died; the king's own life saved by his aunt the Duchess of Berry, who covered him with her dress. There exist paintings of this scene in copies of Froissart's Chroniques (as green men; compare similar image right). (Note: One miniature of British Library ms. Harley 4380, fol. 1r., reproduced on the cover of King ed. (2016), as noted by Eustace. Another miniature in the BnF, ms. Français 2646, fol. 176r) It is supposed that "dyed tufted flax" was used to simulate the hair.

England's Henry VIII held a wild man dance on the Twelfthnight at the Great Hall of Greenwich in 1515.

The Burgundian court celebrated a pas d'armes known as the Pas de la Dame Sauvage ("Passage of arms of the Wild Lady") in Ghent in 1470. A knight held a series of jousts with an allegoric meaning in which the conquest of the wild lady symbolized the feats the knight must do to merit a lady.

== Medieval parallels ==
While the schrat (q.v.) tended to denote a sort of household spirit in later periods, the creature known as schrat, scrato or scrazo in Old High German were glossed as equivalent to the fauni, silvestres, or pilosi in Latin, thus indicating that the earlier notion of the schrat had been close to hairy woodland beings, i.e., the wild men of the woods.

Versions of the divyi lyudi "wondrous folk") from the medieval Russian romance of Alexander the Great appear in later folklore, as aforementioned.

=== Celtic mythology ===
There are medieval Welsh, Irish, and Scottish mythical narratives about men going mad and living in the wilderness, considered as part of the Celtic Wildman tradition according to scholars.

The Welsh tradition regarding Myrddin Wyllt ("mad Merlin") (Note: Cf. also name glossary on Myrdding Gwyllt in: Bromwich, Rachel (2014) [1961]. Trioedd Ynys Prydein: The Triads of the Island of Britain (4 ed.). Cardiff: University Of Wales Press. pp. 458–459. ISBN 9781783161461. Cf. also notes to Triad #61, Tri Thar6 Ellyl (Three Bull-Spectres) of Britain.) is that he went mad after the Battle of Arfderydd which took place in 573 CE in the wake of the battle that resulted in the death of Gwenddoleu ap Ceidio who was the king he served. It is recorded as such in the annals, though it may not be historically accurate. Myrddin then fled to the forest, living life as a man of the woods, according to Giraldus Cambrensis (12th century). The battleground (Arfderydd) became identified as a place near the Scottish border, making plausible the legend that Merlin's flight took him to the Caledonian Forest in Scotland. Geoffrey of Monmouth recounts the Myrddin Wyllt legend in his Latin Vita Merlini of about 1150, (Note: According to Geoffrey, after Merlin witnessed the horrors of the battle:... a strange madness came upon him. He crept away and fled to the woods, unwilling that any should see his going. Into the forest he went, glad to lie hidden beneath the ash trees. He watched the wild creatures grazing on the pasture of the glades. Sometimes he would follow them, sometimes pass them in his course. He made use of the roots of plants and of grasses, of fruit from trees and of the blackberries in the thicket. He became a Man of the Woods, as if dedicated to the woods. So for a whole summer he stayed hidden in the woods, discovered by none, forgetful of himself and of his own, lurking like a wild thing.) and the attachment of the madness motif may or may not have been Geoffrey's invention.

The legend of the Scottish Lailoken who lost his wits in battle is so similar in background to the Myrddin legend, it is considered a version of the same myth, and in fact, there is an aside comment that Lailoken might have been Merlin of Britain though that cannot be ascertained in the source itself, namely the Lailoken fragment or more precisely the Latin fragmentary The Life of Saint Kentigern. There is also a geographical proximity of the battlegrounds involved, pinpointable as present-day Arthuret in Cumbria, England.

The Irish analogue is the legend of Suibhne Geilt ("mad Sweeny"), a king (Note: Not a historically recorded king, thus he was no more than lord.) of the Dál nAraidi who himself went mad during the combat of the Battle of Mag Rath of 637 CE The legend is accounted for in Buile Shuibhne (The Frenzy of Sweeney, 9th century). (Note: The Irish tale describes how Suibhne or Sweeney, the pagan king of the Dál nAraidi in Ulster, assaults the Christian bishop Ronan Finn and is cursed with madness as a result. He begins to grow feathers and talons as the curse runs its full course, flies like a bird, and spends many years travelling naked through the woods, composing verses among other madmen. In order to be forgiven by God, King Suibhne composes a beautiful poem of praise to God before he dies. There are further poems and stories recounting the life and madness of King Suibhne.)

It is commented by James George O'Keeffe (1913) that the Welsh and Irish versions exhibit the dispersed Wild Man (of the Woods) tradition.

In Chrétien's Arthurian Romance Yvain, there is the development where the title hero (shocked by his estrangement from his lover Laudine) loses his wits and lives in the wilderness; this has been characterized as a wild man episode by modern commentators. Bernheimer lists Yvain, Lancelot, and Tristan among the Arthurian knights who chose to live as wild men in the aftermath of mental anguish having earned the disfavor of their beloved lady.

The fragmentary 16th-century Breton text An Dialog Etre Arzur Roe D'an Bretounet Ha Guynglaff (Dialog Between Arthur and Guynglaff) tells of a meeting between King Arthur and Guynglaff ("a sort of wild man of the woods"), who predicts events which will occur as late as the 16th century.

==== King's mirror ====
The notion of the Irish geilt, gelt (madness), which Grimm's notes glosses as equivalent to wilder mann or waldmann, (Note: Grimm also says it compares to Myrddin Gwyllt.) is discussed in the Old Norse Konungs skuggsjá (Speculum Regale or "the King's Mirror", written in Norway about 1250), (Note: Translation from the Norse by Kuno Meyer (a Celticist): There is also one thing which will seem very wonderful about men who are called gelt. It happens that when two hosts meet and are arrayed in battle-array, and when the battle cry is raised loudly on both sides, that cowardly men run wild and lose their wits from the dread and fear which seize them. And then they run into a wood away from other men, and live there like wild beasts, and shun the meeting of men like wild beasts.–Speculum Regale, Chapter: Irish Mirabilia §18 (c. 1250) requoted by O'Keeffe (1913), p. xxxv, note 2, from Kuno Meyer's translation.) which points to the Northmen having learned about the Suibhne legend from Ireland.

== Ancient parallels ==
Figures similar to the European wild man occur worldwide from very early times. The earliest recorded example of the type is the character Enkidu of the ancient Mesopotamian Epic of Gilgamesh.

=== Classical parallels ===
==== Classical wild races ====
"Classical antiquity like the Middle Ages, had its wild men", according to Bernheimer. This included savage races of (sometimes hairy) humans supposedly found in exotic places. Herodotus (c. 484 – c. 425 BCE),'s wild men and wild women supposedly lived in western Ancient Lybia (a vast region west of the Nile, not just the present-day nation) where there also lived marvels such as men with eyes in their chest (headless men) and dog-faced humanoids (cynocephaly). Ctesias's (Note: Former Persian court physician. His sources concerning India were essentially Persian.) Indika (fl. 5th century BCE) and Alexander the Great (d. 323 BCE)'s conquest influenced Europeans into thinking that such wild men (and the marvelous prodigies too (Note: India to be "swarming" with the aforementioned cynocephali and headless men.)) lived rather in the East, in the Indian subcontinent.

Megasthenes (Note: Seleucus I Nicator's ambassador to Chandragupta Maurya.) (died c. 290 BCE), wrote of two kinds of men to be found in India whom he explicitly describes as wild: first, a creature brought to court whose toes faced backwards; second, a tribe of forest people who had no mouths and who sustained themselves with smells. Both Quintus Curtius Rufus and Arrian (1st and 2nd centuries CE) refer to Alexander himself meeting with a tribe of fish-eating savages while on his Indian campaign.

The wild man races described in erudite writings of ancient historians may have had influence on the Medieval wild man folklore but establishing the degree would be difficult given the separation in time. But one can catalogue which ancient pieces of writing were accessible to medieval men. (Note: Bernheimer actually speaks of "legends from the Mediterranean past" exerting "influence of these upon folklore, art, and imaginative literature". As to visual art § Classical influence was discussed above under §Iconography.)

Distorted accounts of apes may have contributed to both the ancient and medieval conception of the wild man. In his Natural History Pliny the Elder describes a silvestres or forest tribe called the Choromandæ (Chromandi) in India, who had humanoid bodies but a coat of fur, fangs, and no capacity to speak – a description that fits gibbons indigenous to the area. The ancient Carthaginian explorer Hanno the Navigator (fl. 500 BCE) reported an encounter with a tribe of savage men and hairy women in what may have been Sierra Leone; their interpreters called them "Gorillae," a story which much later originated the name of the gorilla species and could indeed have related to a great ape. Similarly, the Greek historian Agatharchides describes what may have been chimpanzees as tribes of agile, promiscuous "seed-eaters" and "wood-eaters" living in Ethiopia.

==== Silvanus ====
The medieval wild man lends itself to easy comparison with a number of classical woodland divinities. However, the aforementioned definition laid out by Bernheimer clearly distinguishes the faun and satyr from the wild man. Grimm states that the German shaggy wood-sprite schrat answers to the classical faun, satyr, and perhaps even Silvanus. Old High or Middle High German glossaries equating forms of the word schrat with faunus or sylvestri hominus. Grimm speculates on the possibility schrat might have been a being of larger stature in olden times.

The medieval wild man typically depicted holding an uprooted tree may have derived from the classical Silvanus who is lord of the gardens and uprooter of trees, though the latter is more prone to be holding a cypress sapling he is about to transplant. The centaur is more likely to hold a club, though this creature is of course, half horse.

=== Christian parallels ===
Early Christian writings on Desert Fathers as found in the Apophthegmata Patrum ("Sayings of the Desert Fathers") are similar, but less outlandish: typically their head of hair has grown long enough to cover their naked bodies. A general term to describe such ascetics living in the wilderness was Grazers (Ancient Greek: βοσκοί, romanized: boskoí) coined among the Greek or Eastern Christians. (Note: They were viewed as saints in Byzantine society, and the hagiographical accounts about their lives were spread in all of Christianity, possibly influencing later authors.) There is the hypothesis that the notion of the "noble wild man" that emerged in the 15th century (after the European discovery of the Americas) may have been influenced by the notion of these "grazers".

Although not authentically the stuff of antiquity, regarding the Christian Saint John Chrysostom (died 407), there developed an apocryphal legend in the Late medieval period (15th century) that he began as a soul of a child in purgatory taken into tutelage by the Pope, but considering himself unworthy went to live a life of austerity in the wilderness. Later, in a fateful meeting with the emperor's daughter who had gone astray, he succumbs to temptation and not only has carnal knowledge with her but pushes her off a ravine in the aftermath, for the penance of this sin and crime, he lives life on all fours, eventually developing body hair (with vegetation growing about his body as well), when he is captured in order to perform a baptism for the Imperial prince, upon which the accumulated hair, etc. drops off. Accompanying illustrations may contradict the text and show a smooth, naked man on all fours, e.g., the Günther Zainer edition of Leben der Heiligen, vol. II (1471). Whereas Anton Koberger's edition of Leben der Heiligen (1488) depicts the crawling saint as a hairy man.

== Werewolf syndrome ==
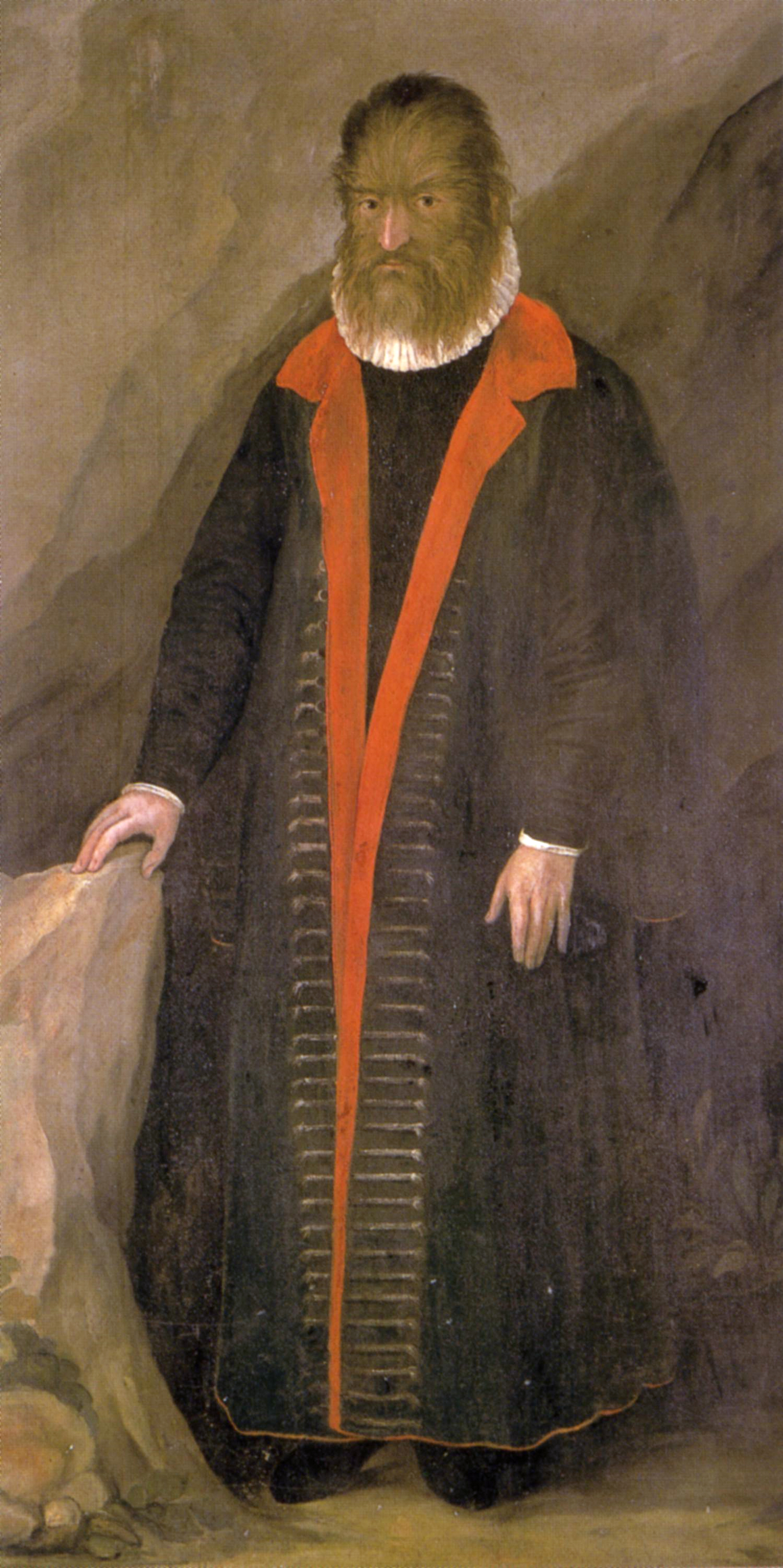
Pedro González. Anon, c. 1580

Petrus Gonsalvus (Pedro González, born 1537, cf. image right) was referred to by Ulisse Aldrovandi as "the man of the woods" or "wild man of the woods" and it was believed that a whole race of such hairy people lived in the Canary Islands, though his hairiness is presumed to be due to his condition, hypertrichosis (aka Ambras syndrome), by modern commentators. His daughter Antonietta or Magdalena inherited the trait.

The story of Pedro González and his marriage to the lady Catherine may have inspired the fairy tale Beauty and the Beast.

== In modern fiction ==
In Shakespeare's The Winter's Tale (1611), the dance of twelve "Satyrs" conflates wild men and satyrs. The dance is held at the rustic sheep-shearing (IV.iv), described by a servant:

Masters, there is three carters, three shepherds, three neat-herds, three swine-herds, that have made themselves all men of hair, they call themselves Saltiers, (Note: Sault, "leap".) and they have a dance which the wenches say is a gallimaufrey (Note: Gallimaufrey, "jumble, medley".) of gambols... (Note: The account Shakespeare may have been inspired by the episode of Ben Jonson's masque Oberon, the Faery Prince (performed 1 January 1611), where the satyrs have "tawnie wrists" and "shaggy thighs"; they "run leaping and making antique action".)

The term wood-woses or simply Woses is used by J. R. R. Tolkien to describe a fictional race of wild men, the Drúedain, in his books on Middle-earth. According to Tolkien's legendarium, other men, including the Rohirrim, mistook the Drúedain for goblins or other wood-creatures and referred to them as Púkel-men (Goblin-men). He allows the fictional possibility that his Drúedain were the "actual" origin of the wild men of later traditional folklore.

British poet Ted Hughes used the form wodwo as the title of a poem and a 1967 volume of his collected works.

The fictional character Tarzan from Edgar Rice Burroughs' 1912 novel Tarzan of the Apes has been described as a modern version of the wild man archetype.

== See also ==
- Am Fear Liath Mòr
- Animal (Muppet)
- Basajaun
- Bigfoot
- Bugbear
- Caveman
- Enkidu
- Fangga
- Green Man
- Hamadryad
- Human zoo
- Jean de l'Ours
- Krampus
- Leshy
- List of hominid cryptids
- Moosmann
- Moss people
- Nittaewo
- Noble savage
- Straw bear
- Tengu
- Valentine and Orson
- Wild Hunt
- Yamawaro
- Yeren
- Yeti
- Tarzanesque
