= Salige (film) =

2005 German-Austrian short film

Salige is a German-Austrian short film made by Austrian director Peter Folie and released in 2006. It was produced by the Academy of Media Arts Cologne in Cologne, Germany in cooperation with Internationale Filmschule Köln.

== Plot summary ==
Annika is a salige, a wild woman living in alpine forests. She hides herself away from a small mountain village, building small carousels from wires and iron clippings. Due to her carelessness Annika is discovered by Henrik, who uses her against the monotony of the countryside. Following Annika to her hideaway, he starts her misery with a rape. As she appears in the village, people don't even think about helping her. But Annika still does not say a word. She hides her mind and by the loss of speech, everyone becomes a victim of banality.

== Festivals ==
- Filmfestival Max-Ophuels-Prize, Saarbrücken, 2006
- International Short Film Festival, Hamburg, 2006
- Prize Halbbilder Short Film Festival, Magdeburg, 2006
- International Festival of Short Fiction Films, Brno, Czech Republic, 2007
