= Bread trough =

Rectangular receptacle with a shallow basin used for making dough

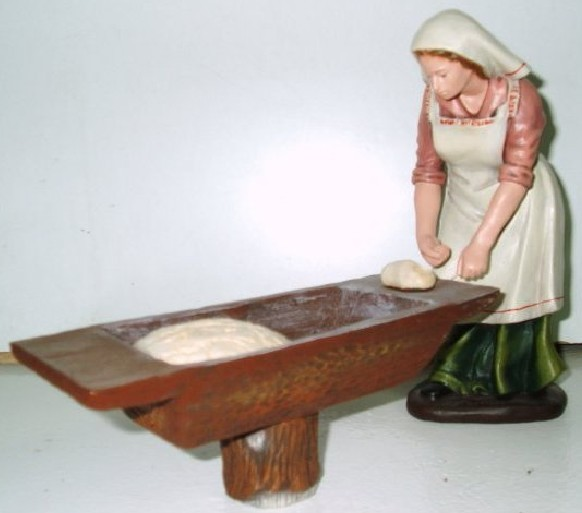
Artesa model in clay.

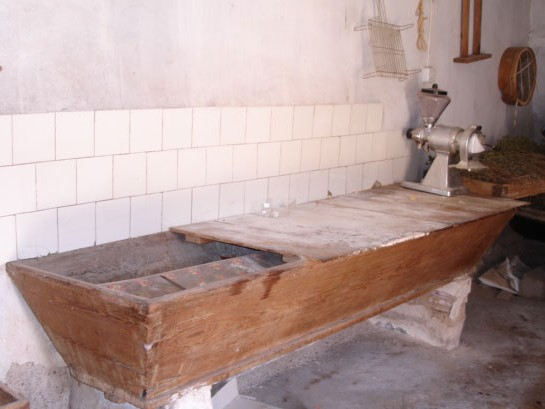
Artesa in breadmaking.

A bread trough, dough trough or kneading trough, sometimes referred to as artesa, is a rectangular receptacle with a shallow basin, and a traditional kneading tool used for the making of dough. The wooden form has been used in Europe for centuries in breadmaking.

== Kneading-trough ==
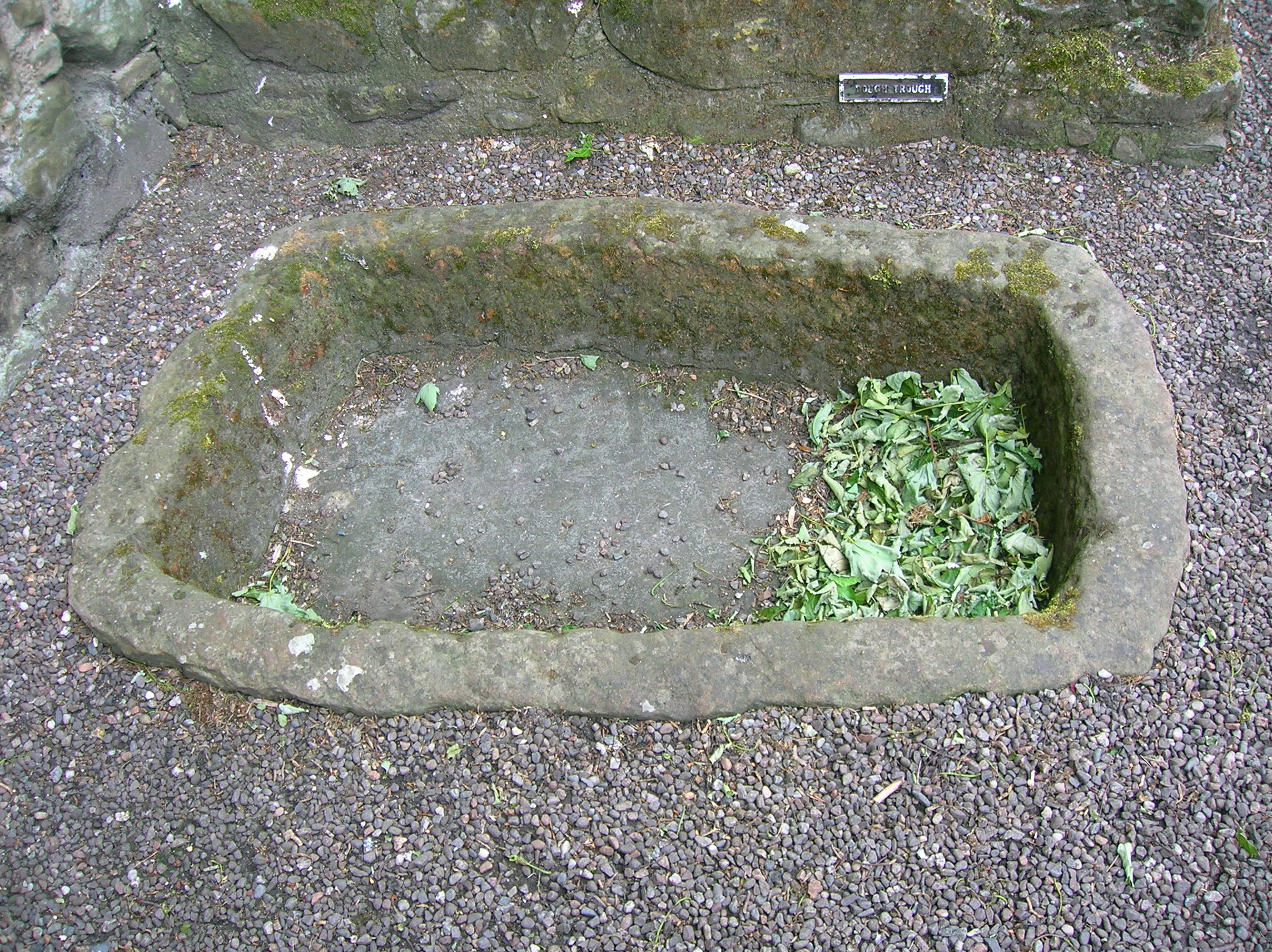
A dough trough from Aberdour Castle, Fife, Scotland.

A kneading trough is a term for the vessel in which dough, after being mixed and leavened was left to swell or ferment.

The first citation of kneading-trough in the Oxford English Dictionary is Chaucer, The Miller's Tale, 1386. Flour was not stored, perhaps for fear of insect infestation, but kneaded into dough and baked into bread without delay. Kneading-troughs in the Miller's Tale are big enough for people to sleep in and may be used as floating rafts.

== Other uses ==
Mechanization in bakeries and new technologies in bread ovens have mostly relegated the artesa to either recycling or as a flowerpot, except in more traditional or rural areas. Some small bakeries continue to use them.

== See also ==
- Feeding trough, see manger, a food receptacle for animals
- Watering trough, a receptacle of drinking water for animals
