= Salige Frau =

Mythical figure in German alpine regions

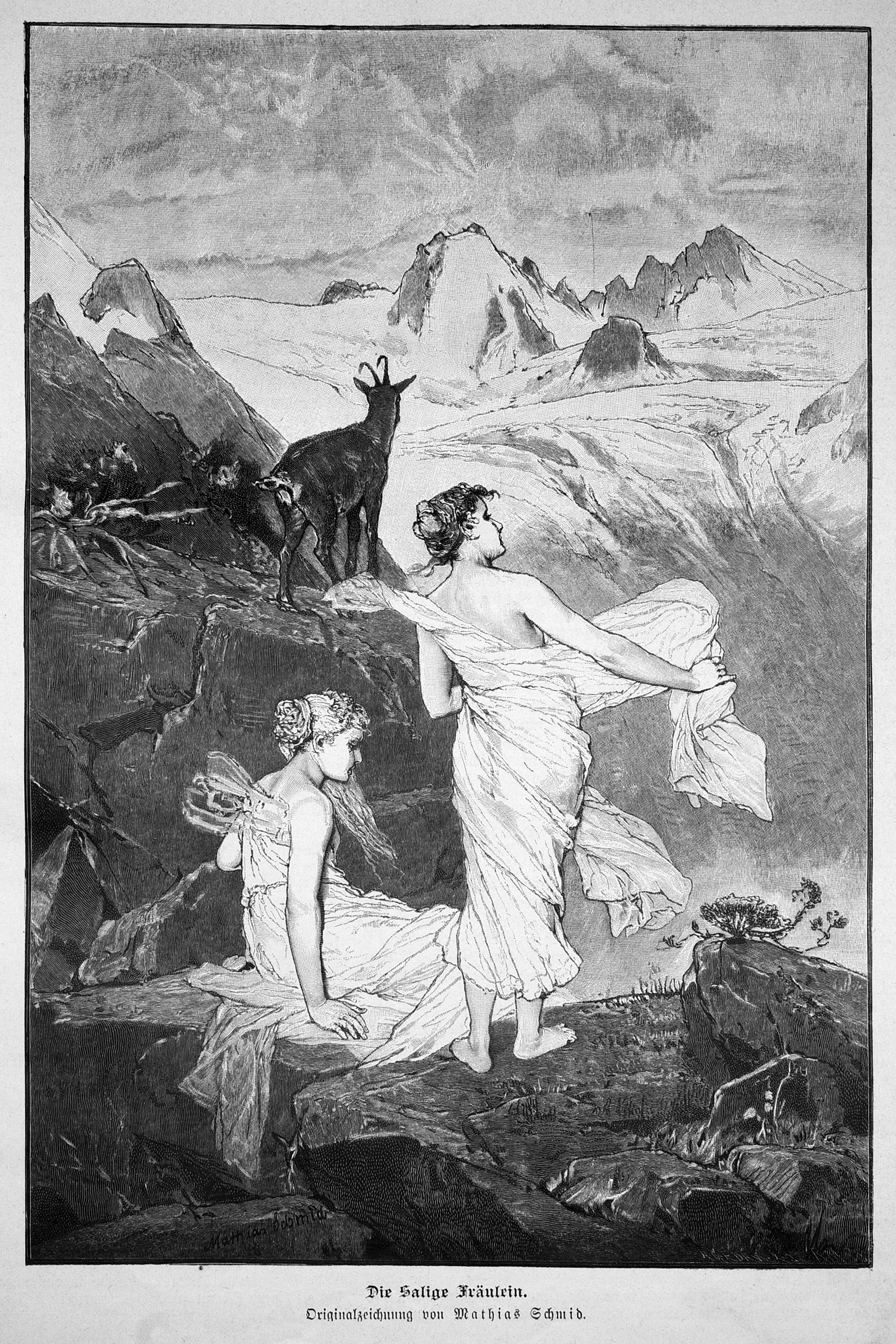
"Die Salige Fräulein" ―Mathias Schmid (1887)

A salige Frau (pl. salige Frauen) or salige Fräulein, also called Salkweib, Salaweib (pl. Salkweiber, Salaweiber) or weiße Frau (pl. weiße Frauen), is a mythical figure mainly from the German-speaking Alpine region. The legends are particularly plentiful in the Inntal, Ötztal mostly in Austria or Vinschgau, South Tyrol (now Italy).

== Nomenclature ==
The name in standard German corresponds to Middle High German: sælic or modern standard German: selig meaning "blissful". This word is cognate with English "seely", and "seelie court" is etymologically related as well. (Note: SND gives the "seelie court" usage as adjective form of Scots noun seil, sell, cognate to Middle English sele, which in turn is cognate to OHG sâlig which obviously descends to mod. German selig.)

In South Tyrolean tradition, there are the Salige Fräulein ("blissful maiden[s]") also simply called the Salige (pl. Saligen). The Salige and the Fängge (Faengge) are considered closely related or identical to the wilde Frau (wild woman) of Tirol. The beings referred to as wilde Fräulein (or wilde Frau) in folklore or legend are also equated with the salige Fräulein. Other variants to the name are Salgfräulein or Selige Fräulein.

In the Wälschtirol (Trento Province), she may be known as Enguane or Belle Vivane (Delle Vivane).

The equivalent names žalk žané, žalk žene, or žalik žene (Note: And variant žark žané due to Lautersatz (sound substitution).) (all plural forms) are used by the Slovene population in Carinthia, where the first part is equivalent to the German salige for "blissful"; while žena is pan-Slavic for "woman" (Slovene plural: žêne).

== Description ==
The blessed women are described as shy, but helpful and wise. They used to live in deep rock caves (Note: Examples: Cave by Frauenstein at Ötztal, in Tierser Tal valley, above Weissensee lake. Also the Salkweib of Drava River.) (or even caves in glaciers (Note: Legend in verse " Saligfräulein";)). They were reclusive creatures, yet they offered advice and assistance to unexpected visitors. They helped poor farmers and those who were incapacitated. However, at night, when the moon shone brightly against the starry sky, one should not encounter the blessed women, unless one was loud and made a racket, as they abhorred noise.

== In folktales and legends ==
=== Ötztal ===
There was a landmark in the Ötztal valley in Tyrol called the Frauenstein ("ladies' rock") where the wilde Fräulein liked to appear, combing their blond hair and singing songs beautifully. But they would retreat into their cave as soon as they notice human presence. The cave they dug was nine steps deep, and located at a place between Kropfbühl and Unterastlen, called Stinker. A dwelling of the supernatural women also is said to be at Längenfeld, (cf. the story under § Guardians of the chamois).

=== Drava river ===
The Salkweiber were said to live in caves on the banks of the Drava River, in Rosental, a valley near Rosegg in Carinthia, and subsist on fish. They had misshapen feet. The singing Salige Frauen would also do laundry on the Drava (cf. § Wild hunt).

=== Plant lore ===
Another legend says a farmer heard voices near the Drava in the dead of winter, advising him to sow beans in the snow, which sprouted, then upon another advice, released the pigs on them, which fed on the seedlings, and yet the plant matured and provided a bounty of harvestable beans afterwards. (Note: Besides this tale (no. 3) are variants with this bean-planting instruction motif given as no. 5, no. 6. No. 5 is localized in Unterbergen (several such names occur in Carinthia), where the Salige Frauen are called by the Slovene name Žalk žané. No. 6 is set in a place called Dragonerfelsen ("dragon rock") near Trixen.) The Salkweiber are known to capture young men and kiss him or have their way with him, but if one kept cracking the whip or sang, the noises they abhorred kept them at bay.

A legend from the Vinschgau Valley in South Tyrol claims she introduced the buckwheat, a heretofore unknown crop in the region, during a year struck with severe drought. The Salige Fräulein are especially connected with flax culture, and Frau Hulda who is held to be their queen is said to have taught humans the lore of growing, spinning, and weaving flax fibers.

Near a Salkhöhlen (cave), a Salk who sneaked in to sleep in the bed of peasant's wife but treated kindly (Note: The wife found her golden locks tumbled to the floor and lifted it back up on the bed without disturbing the sleeper.) bestowed upon the wife a filament of her hair to serve as an inexhaustible supply of thread on the spinning wheel. The wife spun the finest linen cloth (usually woven from flax) and made rich, so it was already fine time to quit when the wife spoke out her impatience one day, against the spirit's warning, causing the thread to run out.

=== Guardians of the chamois ===
Austrian legend has it that Salige Frauen (like the Fänggen and various local versions of wilde Weiber) are protectors of game and especially the chamois. In Tyrol, the Selige's supposedly kept their dwelling the "Dehlgrubenthal" (Note: Valley stretching from Kaunertal southward to Gepatsch glacier, and spreading eastward.) and near it was a landmark under the ice named "Gamshimmel (chamois heaven)". This is reminiscent of the legend of "Paradiese der Thiere (animal paradise)" said to be high up Vispertal. (Note: Described as being on the "Matteberg" (unclear). Note that "Vispertal" in the broad sense is also catchall that includes Mattertal, which flanks Matterhorn.)

According to one legend, a young man named Schütz from Längenfeld, Ötztal suffered a fall in the mountains and by chance gained entry to den of the Salige Fräulein in a crystal grotto, with its palace and gardens. He was allowed permission to revisit, as long as he kept the promise not to reveal the secret, and not to slay any mountain beast. He lost his privilege one night when his curious mother followed him and raised her voice as he was about to enter. He loses motivation in life, but encouraged by his friends decided of all things to join them in hunting, and shot at a chamois. Three angry Salige appeared to protect it, and a shudder came over the youth that made him fall from the precipice, dashing him to pieces. (Note: In a close variant version, a shepherd gets admission after spilling his noodles when trying to pray at the sound of the church bells, loses his pass with his indiscretion of the secret to his father, turns a chamois hunter breaking the second taboo, and blinded by the Selige's radiance, he falls to death.)

It is also claimed that these Salige Fräulein normally only appear to humans in the guise of bearded vultures (Note: German: Jochgeier.) as they guard their chamois up in the mountains.

=== Wild hunt ===
The Salige Frauen are considered the prey of the wild man. (Note: Grimm: "In Tirol he [the wild hunter] chases the Salg-fräulein". Likewise the wild hunter "baits the loh-jungfer", citing Sommer, Emil (1846) Sagen pp. 7, 167".) (Note: Schwarz states that if one calls upon the wilde Jäger ('huntsman' of the Wild Hunt), he may share half a dead child or half of a Salige. There are legends about the wild man of Wälsch-Tirol (now Trento Province) that throws half a human corpse (or a Christian's leg) at the house of whoever asked for a share, followed by the telling of the recipient asking to take the gruesome quarry back. Cf. Mannhardt who cites Schneller as well as Schwarz, p. 110 (recte p. 10).) The people of Tiers (Tierser Tal) held that the selige inhabited a cave in Tschamintal that burrowed deep in the Schlern mountain, until driven away by the wild hunt.

In one story from the village of Mieger near Klagenfurt, the golden-haired Salige Frauen would take trips laundering linen in the Drava, and sing while shepherding their livestock from cave to river. However, there was a giant who would hunt them, and the Frauen asked the local men to leave a sign of the cross on the stump of trees they harvested, because those spots would then serve as safe haven from the giant. As a parallel, the sign of the cross on the tree stump also provides safety to the Buschweibel (or Buschweiblein) of the mountain forests of Silesia, also called the Rüttelweib (pl. Rüttelweiber) in the Giant Mountains. (Note: Another source (Praetorius) states that the Buschweiblein is provided protection either by the cross-mark on the stump using an ax, or by pronouncing a word of blessing "Walt's Gott!" over the stump. This is somewhat contradicted by the 17th century attestation that Rüttelweib of the Giant Mountains hunted by Nachtjäger ("Night hunter") is safe at a tree stump wherever the woodcutter has blessed it saying "Gott waels!" ("God hast chosen it"), for the blessing will fail if he reverses the order and mentions God afterwards (Johannes Praetorius on Rübezahl).) (Note: Cf. similar motif in the untitled story translated from the Italian into German, where the cowherd (boaro) is asked to inscribe a circle using his goad (stombi, German: Stachelstock), then the supernatural woman who is saved becomes his wife.)

=== Miscellaneous ===
The legendary Salige dwelling in the cave named Dolmetzenloch above the lake Weissensee in Carinthia is also known, and became the basis of the Brandner (2021) novel.

== In fiction ==
- Bartsch, Rudolf Hans (1924). Die Salige. Leipzig: Staackmann
- Lendorff, Gertrud (1935). Die salige Frau. Frauenfeld und Leipzig: Huber & Co.
- Prem, Brigitte (2020). Der Bergbauer und das Salkweib. Historisierender Roman mit Anleihen aus den Volksmythen. Münster: AT Edition, ISBN 978-3-89781-273-4.
- Brandner, Regine (2021). SO HAM - Das Geheimnis der Saligen vom Weissensee. Wien: Eigenverlag. ISBN 978-3-9505122-4-3 (translated as SO HAM - The Secret of the Blisslady: A Novel based on an old legend from Lake Weissensee in the Austrian Alps, 2023).

== See also ==
- Skogsrå - Swedish wood nymphs, also prey of the Wild Hunt
- Frau Saelde (Fortuna) - chased by Wunderer
- Ötzi - The murdered Copper Age ice man discovered in Ötztal , with chamois meat in his stomach content
