= Eckenlied =

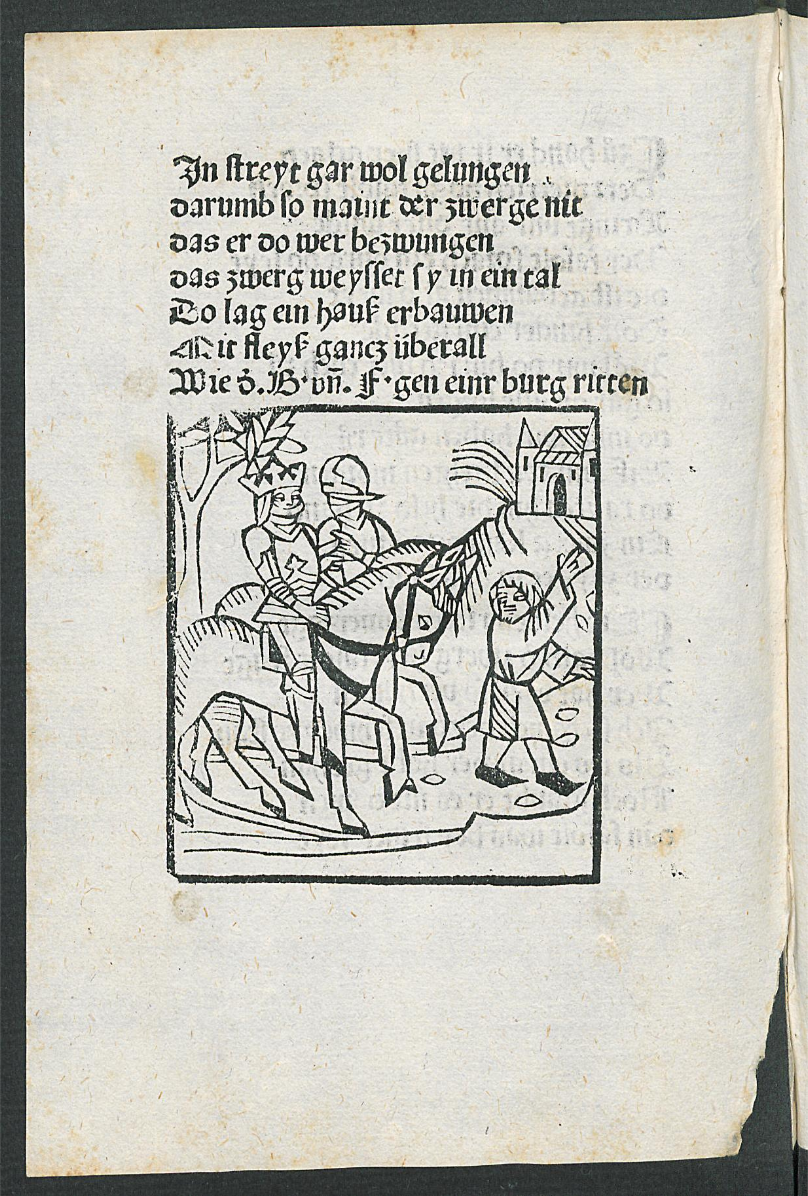
Dietrich and Fasold. Woodcut from the printed Eckenlied by von Hans Schaur, Augsburg, 1491. Fol. 70v. Staatsbubliothek zu Berlin Inc. 321 8°

Das Eckenlied or Ecken Ausfahrt (The Song of Ecke or Ecke's Quest) is an anonymous 13th-century Middle High German poem about the legendary hero Dietrich von Bern, the counterpart of the historical Ostrogothic king Theodoric the Great in Germanic heroic legend. It is one of the so-called fantastical (aventiurehaft) Dietrich poems, so called because it more closely resembles a courtly romance than a heroic epic.

The Eckenlied tells the story of Dietrich's fight against the giant Ecke, who has been sent out by three queens to fetch Dietrich. Dietrich is forced to kill Ecke, after which he must fight Ecke's family, particularly Ecke's treacherous and vengeful brother Fasold. The poem exists in at least three separate but closely related versions, which offer different endings to the tale. A fragmentary text known as Dietrich und Fasold may represent another version of the Eckenlied, but differences in meter and content make this uncertain. Fasold and the three queens may have originally been figures of Tyrolean folklore, while Ecke may have been invented to explain the name of Dietrich's sword, Eckesachs (sharp sword).

The Eckenlied is the earliest poem about Dietrich attested (c. 1230) after his appearance in the Nibelungenlied. It was one of the most popular narratives about Dietrich throughout the Middle Ages and into the early modern period. It was first printed in 1490 and continued to be printed until the end of the 1500s.

== Summary ==
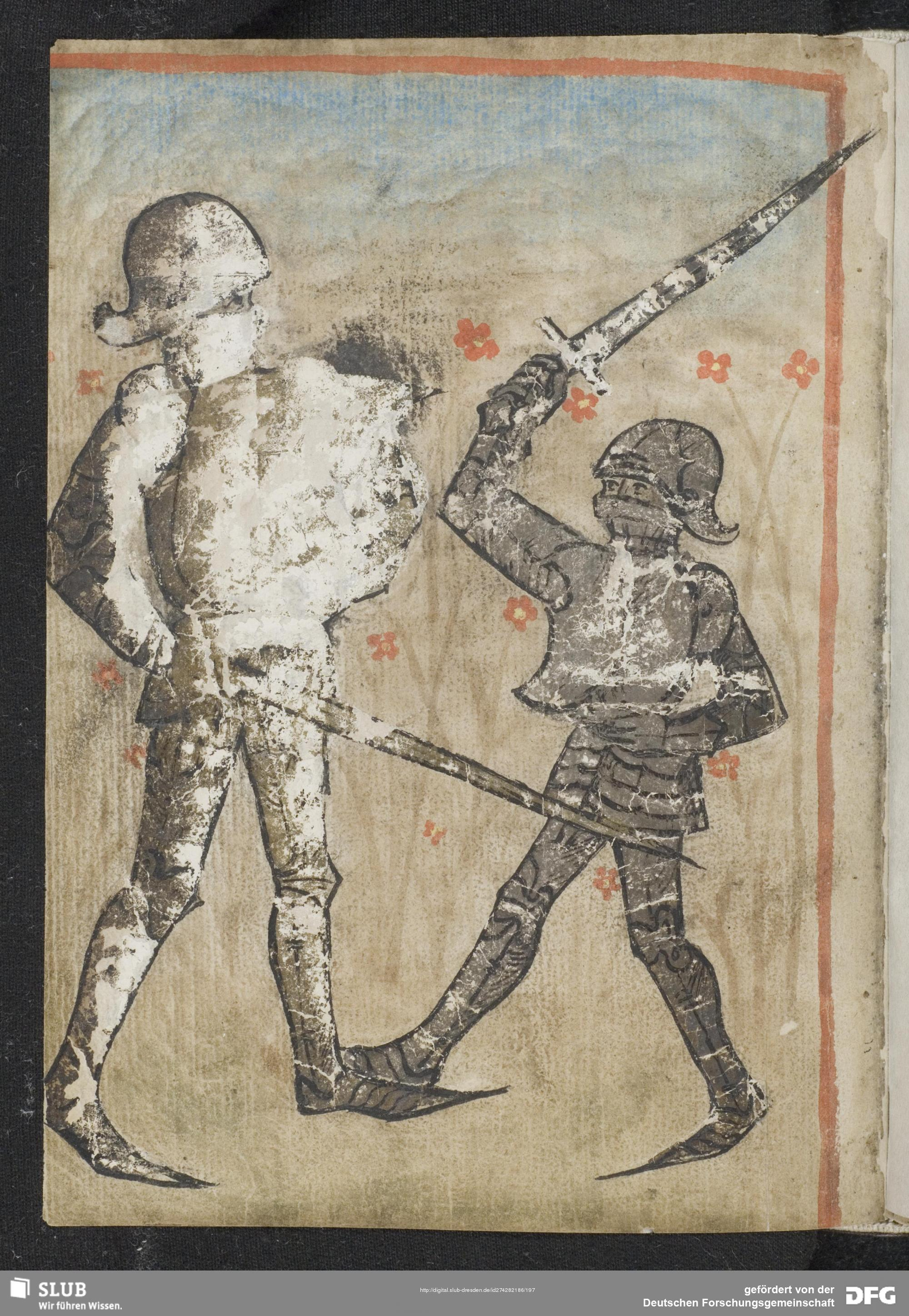
Dietrich fights against Ecke. SLUB Dresden, Mscr. Dresden M. 201 fol. 91v.

The Eckenlied begins with a conversation between three giants: Ecke, Fasold, and Ebenrot. Ecke proclaims that Dietrich von Bern is praised by everyone, while Ecke, despite having performed heroic deeds, is completely unknown. Ebenrot counters that Dietrich's reputation is a lie: the hero treacherously slew the giants Hilde and Grim while they were asleep to steal their armor. Fasold intervenes and says that Ebenrot is wrong: Dietrich slew Hilde and Grim because the giants would otherwise have killed him. Ecke decides to agree with Fasold. Meanwhile, three queens are on the mountain of Jochgrimm: one of them, Seburg wishes very much to see Dietrich, and hearing of Ecke's interest, asks him to bring the hero to her. To encourage Ecke not to kill Dietrich, Seburg gives Ecke a sword and armor hardened in dragon blood. It is the same armor that Emperor Ortnit wore when he rode out to fight dragons: Ortnit fell into a magic sleep, however, and was dragged away by a dragoness to her brood, which sucked his flesh out through the invincible armor. It was then recovered by Wolfdietrich, who killed the dragons, but himself had to go to a monastery to repent for his sins, being tortured by demons. From there Seburg got the armor. She tries to convince Ecke to take a horse, but he refuses.

Ecke travels to Verona, but is directed to Tyrol. After coming upon a man mortally wounded by Dietrich, Hilferich von Lunders (possibly Londres, i.e. London; in other versions he is described as von Lune and von Lütringen, i.e. Lotharingia), he finally encounters Dietrich himself, and challenges him to combat. Dietrich refuses, saying Ecke has done him no wrong, and Ecke accuses him of cowardice (zagheit). At this Dietrich agrees to fight. Ecke and Dietrich fight for a long time, and Ecke tries to force Dietrich to surrender, but Dietrich refuses. Finally, Dietrich gains the upper hand, but Ecke also refuses to surrender. Due to Ecke's invincible armor, Dietrich is forced to stab the giant dishonorably through a gap in his armor. He then mourns Ecke at some length. Ecke asks Dietrich to cut off his head and bring it to Seburg, which he does. He then puts on the giant's armor and takes his sword. In the Landsberger version, a nymph named Vrou Babehilt binds his wounds.

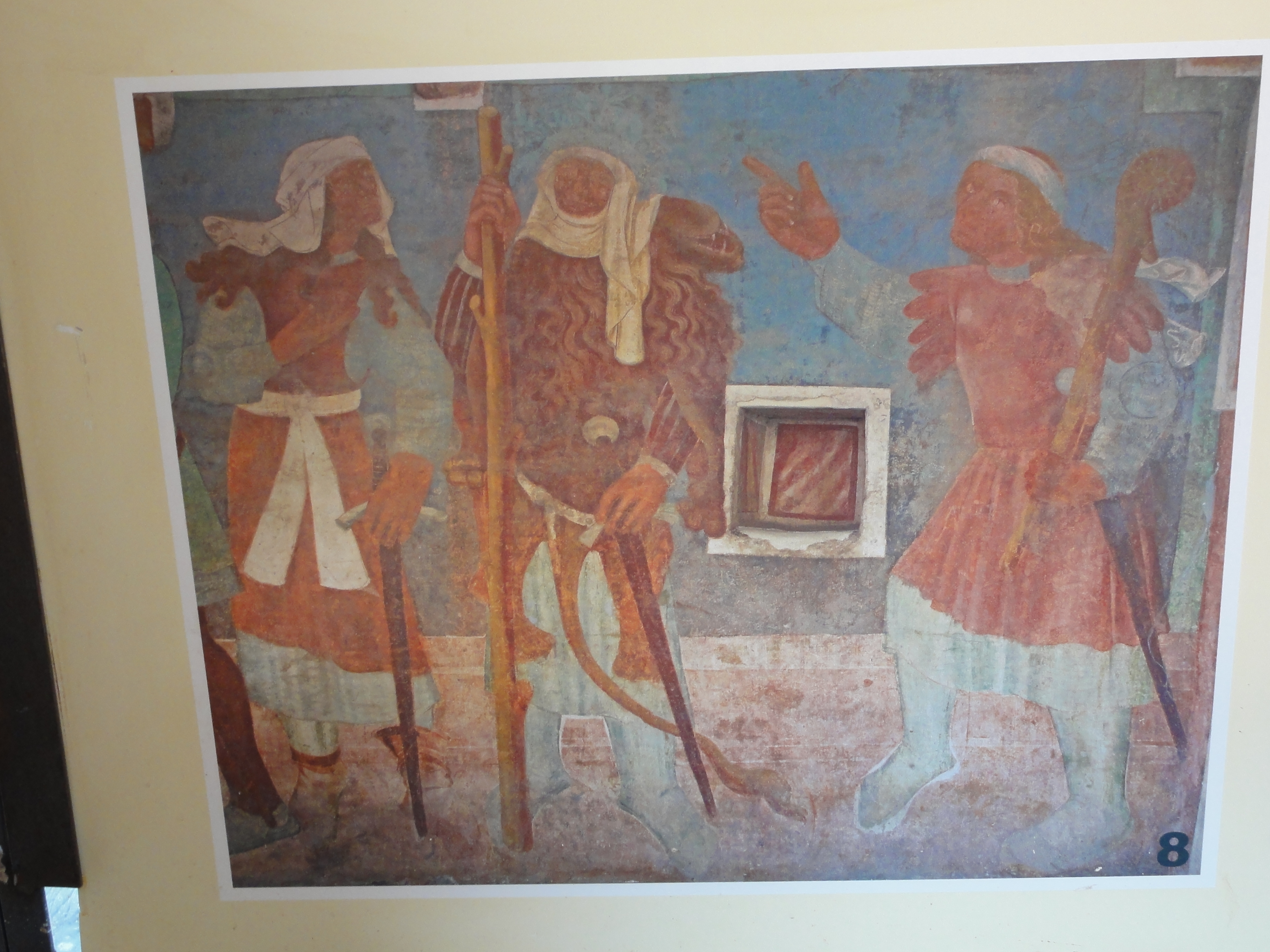
Triad of giantesses, included Ritsch from Eckenlied version E_{7}. Runkelstein Castle near Bozen, c. 1400.

After recovering some from his wounds, Dietrich encounters a woman running through the forest. She is being hunted by Fasold, who rides up and demands to know why Dietrich is interfering with his hunt. Fasold is described as having two long braided locks that hang down to his waist and which are woven in with iron. The giant decides not to fight the still gravely wounded Dietrich, apparently not recognizing his brother's armor or seeing Ecke's head. Dietrich falls asleep while the maiden watches. However, Fasold changes his mind and returns in the night – the maiden is barely able to rouse Dietrich before Fasold appears with his hounds. The two fight, and Dietrich overcomes Fasold by cutting off his braided locks, and the giant surrenders. However, he then recognizes his brother's armor and Dietrich admits to having killed Ecke, and the two fight once more. Dietrich accuses Fasold of fighting with the strength of two men, saying Ecke's spirit has entered the giant, at which Fasold counters that Diether's spirit must have entered Dietrich, he is so strong. At the memory of Witige's treachery, Dietrich is enraged and finally overcomes Fasold, sparing him only at the insistence of the maiden.

At this point the three texts diverge – in all, Fasold treacherously leads Dietrich to members of his family in hopes that they will kill him, taking him to the giant Eckenot (whose name may be a corruption of Ebenrot or vice versa) and then to two or three giantesses, variously Ecke's mother, aunt, or sisters. The oldest nearly complete version, E_{2} breaks off at this point. In the remaining two complete versions E_{7} and e_{1}, Dietrich finally kills Fasold for his treacherous behavior In version E_{7}, which is probably the original ending, he then rides into Jochgrimm and throws the head of Ecke at the feet of Seburg, saying that she is the cause of Ecke's pointless death. In version e_{1}, Seburg reveals that she sent Ecke to his death deliberately, since he and his brothers were going to force them into marriage. It also mentions that, with Ecke's sword Dietrich later slew Odoacer when called upon to do so by Emperor Zeno.

== Transmission, versions, and dating ==
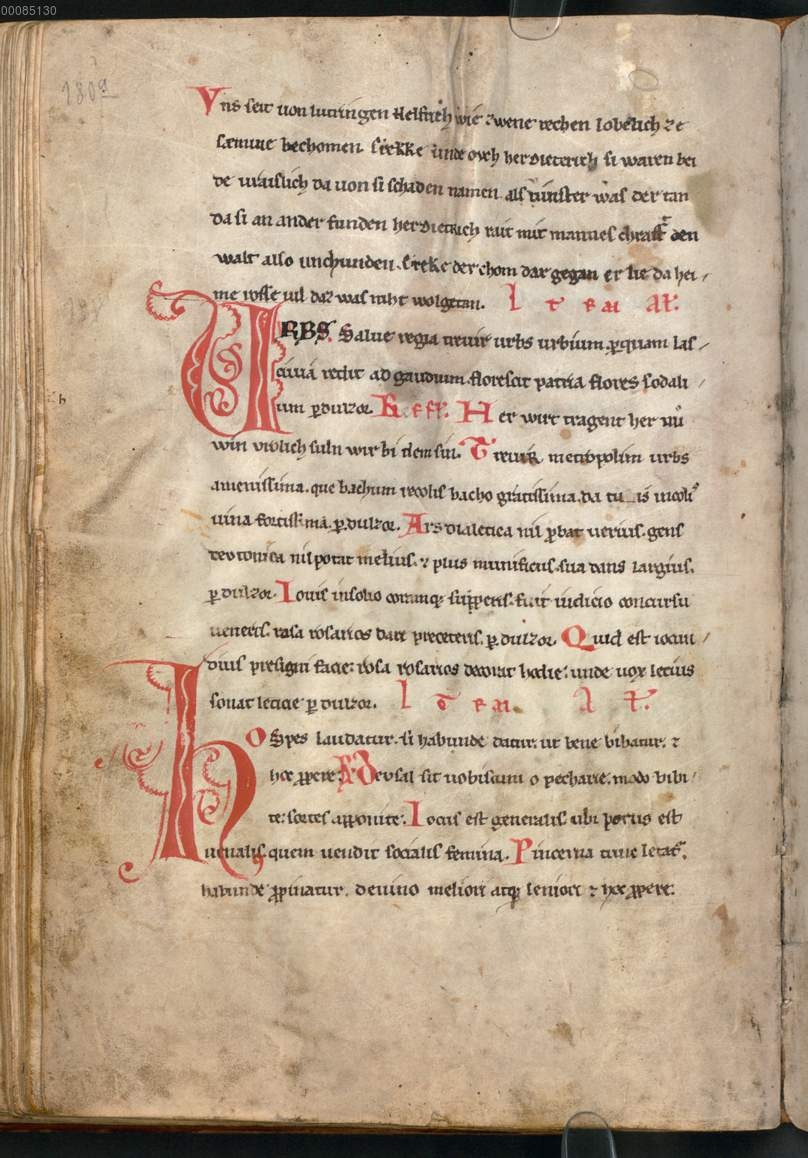
Eckenlied stanza at the top of the page, in the Codex Buranus (c. 1230). This is the oldest transmission of the Eckenlied or of any Dietrich poem. BSB Clm 4660 fol. 90v.

The Eckenlied is transmitted in numerous manuscripts and printed versions, beginning in 1230. The poem was likely composed shortly before that time, possibly in Tyrol. As with almost all German heroic epic, it is anonymous. It was one of the most popular poems about Dietrich.

In common with all fantastical Dietrich poems, the Eckenlied is characterized by a great deal of variation in its transmission, so that each manuscript essentially represents a parallel and equally valid version of the poem. The three principle versions are E_{2} (c. 1300, incomplete), E_{7} (1472), and e_{1} (printed 1491). The oldest attestation, E_{1}, a single stanza in the Codex Buranus, appear to show that the poem existed in a much shorter version, beginning with Ecke's encounter with Dietrich in the forest. It is possible that this is the original beginning of the poem, with everything before this encounter being added later. Although version E_{7} is from the fifteenth century, various fragments and depictions in Runkelstein Castle make it likely that similar versions existed in the first half of the fourteenth century. Similarly, parts of a version similar to the incomplete E_{2} were copied into a printed text of the Eckenlied by fifteenth century scribe Konrad Bollstatter. All versions thus existed at the same time and should be treated equally.

Each manuscript or print is listed below according to the version of the Eckenlied it contains as named by Joachim Heinzle.

Manuscripts:

- E_{1} (B): The Codex Buranus, Bayerische Staatsbibliothek Munich, Clm 4660. Parchment, around 1230. Contains mostly Latin lyric poems, some with German stanzas appended, including one stanza of the Eckenlied.
- E_{2} (L): Badische Landesbibliothek Karlsruhe, Cod. Donaueschingen 74. Parchment, c. 1300, East Alemannic dialect (from Konstanz?). Contains various literary texts, including the Sigenot followed by the Eckenlied.
- E_{3} (A): Ansbach, formerly Archive of the Evangelical-Lutheran Dekanat. First half of the 14th century, Rhine-Franconian dialect. Fragmentary oldest Heldenbuch. Lost.
- E_{4} (m_{1.2}): Bayerische Staatsbibliothek Munich, Cgm. 252. Paper, 1455–77 from Augsburg.
- E_{5} (h): Germanisches Nationalmuseum Nuremberg, Hs. 42546. Fragment, paper, around 1470, Bavarian or East-Swabian dialect.
- E_{6} (š): Stiftsbibliothek Schlierbach (Upper Austria), Cod. I 25. Paper, middle of the fifteenth century. Four stanzas of the Eckenlied have been written on the inside of the back cover by a hand of the fifteenth or sixteenth century, Bavarian dialect.
- E_{7} (d): The Dresdner Heldenbuch. Sächsische Landesbibliothek Dresden, Msc. M 201. Paper, 1472, from Nuremberg(?).

The first printing represents an independent version:

- e_{1} (a): Augsburg, Hans Schaur, 1491. Printed Heldenbuch.

There follow more than eleven further printings into the sixteenth century and beyond.

The fragmentary Dietrich und Fasold is transmitted on three small strips of a manuscript from around 1300 that were used as bookbinding in Niedersächsische Landesbibliothek Hanover MS VII 626.

== Themes ==
The Eckenlied is often interpreted as a critique of courtly love service: Ecke foolishly rides out on behalf of Seburg, which results in his death and extreme hardship for Dietrich. Dietrich's zagheit (cowardice), a common motif in the fantastical Dietrich poems, functions here as a criticism of Ecke's insistence on fighting. Victor Millet sees in this criticism a disavowal of the knightly battles on behalf of women commonly portrayed in courtly romance. On the other hand, version e_{1} removes any criticism of love service and thus moves the epic much closer to romance. At the same time, Dietrich's brutal killing of Ecke casts heroic battle in a bad light, except in version E_{7}, where Dietrich's innocence is emphasized to a greater degree.

Particularly the opening conversation of the poem is frequently seen as a metaliterary discussion about the status of Dietrich as a hero: Ecke, Fasolt, Ebenrot, and Seburg all desire to verify Dietrich's fame, in the same manner as the audience might.

The Eckenlied also alludes to themes from the historical Dietrich poems, particularly events recounted in the Rabenschlacht: when Dietrich fights Fasold, Fasold taunts Dietrich with the death of Dietrich's brother Diether and Etzel's sons at the hands of Witege. Fasold implicitly compares Dietrich to Witege, as Fasold seeks to avenge his own brother's death. Meanwhile, Dietrich's successful defeat of Fasold avenges his failure to avenge his own brother and also allows him to get past his problematic victory over Ecke. Dietrich's defeat of the giants, who can be seen as personifying injustice, helps prove his qualities as an ideal ruler, something which e_{1} explicitly connects to the historical Theoderic's defeat of Odoacer and rule in Italy.

Older scholarship believed that the Eckenlied had been heavily influenced by an Old French Arthurian romance "Le Chevalier du Papagau," in which Arthur fights against a similar giant antagonist. An earlier "native" poem about Ecke would thus have been rewritten to incorporate plot elements from this romance. More recent scholarship has abandoned this connection, viewing the similarities as superficial.

== Metrical Form ==
Like the majority of German heroic epics, the Eckenlied is written in stanzas. The poem is composed in a stanza form known as the "Berner Ton," which consists of 13 lines in the following rhyme scheme: aabccbdedefxf. It shares this metrical form with the poems Goldemar, Sigenot, and Virginal. Early modern melodies for the "Berner Ton" have survived, indicating that it was meant to be sung. Heinzle gives the first stanza of the Eckenlied as a typical example:

Ez sâzen helde in eime sal, a (four feet)
sî retten wunder âne zal a (four feet)
von ûz erwelten recken. b (three feet)
der eine was sich her Vâsolt c (four feet)
(dem wâren schoene vrouwen holt), c (four feet)
daz ander was her Ecke, b (three feet)
daz dritte der wild Ebenrôt. d (four feet)
sî retten al gelîche e (three feet)
daz nieman küener waer ze nôt, d (four feet)
den von Berne her Dieterîche: e (three feet)
der waer ein helt übr alliu lant. f (four feet)
sô waer mit listen küene x (three feet)
der alte Hiltebrant. f (three feet)

In the earliest version, E_{1}, there is a slight variation in how the stanza is put together, with the lines pattern instead as: aabccbxexefxf. Heinzle interprets this to mean that the lines without rhymes were originally the first half of a caesura in a "Langzeile," the same line unit used in the Nibelungenlied. This features three or four feet, a caesura, then an additional three or four feet, depending on placement in the stanza. Printed this way, the stanza from the Codex Buranus (cited according to Vollmann's edition) appears thus:

Vns seit uon Lutringen Helfrich, a
wie zwene rechen lobelich a
ze saemine bechomen: b
Erekke unde ovch her Dieterich; c
si waren beide uraislich, c
da uon si schaden namen. b
als uinster was der tan, x || da si an ander funden e
her Dieterich rait mit mannes chraft x || den walt also unchunden. e
Ereke der chom dar gegan; f
er lie da heime rosse uil; x || daz was niht wolgetan. f

Dietrich und Fasold appears to be written either in the same stanza as the Nibelungenlied, or else in the "Hildebrandston"—it is not clear from the fragmentary nature of the text.

== Relation to the Oral Tradition ==
The Eckenlied, together with Sigenot are the only attestations of a story-possibly a lost poem-about the giants Hilde and Grim, from whom Dietrich won his helmet, named "Hildegrim." The tale is told in its entirely only in the Old Norse Thidrekssaga, which used German sources. It is also possible that there may never have been a written poem about Hilde and Grim; the tale may have been a purely oral one and well known to the Eckenlied's and Sigenot's audience.

The poem is often interpreted as an explanation of the name of Dietrich's sword, Eckesachs. This originally meant "sword with a sharp edge", but when ecke took on the meaning it has in modern German (corner), the name was reinterpreted as meaning "the sword of Ecke". The name Eckesachs never appears in the text however, though the sword is referred to as "Hern Ecken sachs" (Sir Ecke's sword). Eckesachs was apparently famous enough to be referenced in Heinrich von Veldeke's Eneis (c. 1186), which predates the Eckenlied. Heinzle does not believe that this early mention is any proof of an oral story about Ecke.

Whether or not Ecke has a long existence in oral tradition, Fasolt and Seburg are more commonly supposed to have. They are commonly connected to a 17th-century prayer to witches at the mountain Jochgrimm outside of Bozen to cause "ffasolt" to send storms far away. This would make the three queens in the Eckenlied into witches with power over the weather, while Fasolt would be a storm demon. Fasolt's long hair is also taken as evidence of his demonic origins: The name Fasolt likely derives from a root similar to Old High German faso, thread, and most likely refers to his long braided hair. If this interpretation is correct, than Fasolt and Ecke were not originally brothers, but Ecke was inserted into a much older story. Heinzle, however, dismisses the weather prayer: its source is unclear and neither is it clear that "ffasolt" is the same as the Fasolt found in the Eckenlied Fasolt may also be a sort of reversal of versions of a legend in which Dietrich von Bern is leader of the Wild Hunt and hunts women in the forest: Dietrich instead fights against an opponent with this characteristic, as he also does in the Wunderer and Virginal.

Further evidence for an oral version of the tale might be provided by the Ekka episode Thidrekssaga, which differs in crucial details in both its treatment of Ecke and Fasold. Additionally, the fragmentary Dietrich und Fasold appears to match neither the meter nor the content of the Eckenlied. Particularly because of the version found in the Thidrekssaga, Victor Millet believes that it is highly likely that there were oral tales circulating about Ecke. Heinzle, however, is doubtful that any such oral tradition exists: he suggests rather that the Ekka episode was altered by the compiler of the Thidrekssaga.

== Reception ==
The Eckenlied was one of the most popular poems about Dietrich, with one or possibly two of Dietrich's giantess opponents from the Dresden version being included to in the frescoes at Runkelstein Castle (c. 1400). Ecke is frequently mentioned as Dietrich's opponent when authors make allusions to the legends about Dietrich. In the fifteenth and sixteenth centuries, the poem even seems to have inspired a saying, "Ecke ist an den Berner geraten" (Ecke has met the Berner [i.e. Dietrich]), meaning that someone has met their match.

== Editions ==
- Brévart, Francis B., ed. (1986). Das Eckenlied: Mittelhochdeutsch/Neuhochdeutsch. Stuttgart: Reclam. ISBN 3150083397.
- Brévart, Francis B., ed. (1999). Das Eckenlied: Sämtliche Fassungen (3 Volumes). Altdeutsche Textbibliothek, 111. Tübingen: Niemeyer. ISBN 3484202114.
- Vollmann, Benedikt Konrad, ed. (1987). Carmina Burana: Texte und Übersetzungen, mit den Miniaturen aus der Handschrift und einem Aufsatz von Peter und Dorotheee Diemer. Berlin: Deutscher Klassiker. ISBN 3618661401.
- Zupitza, Julius, ed. (1870). "Ecken Liet". Das Heldenbuch, fünfter Teil: Dietrichs Abenteuer von Albrecht von Kemenaten nebst den Bruchstücken von Dietrich und Wenezlan. Berlin: Weidmann. pp. 219–264.
