= Sigenot =

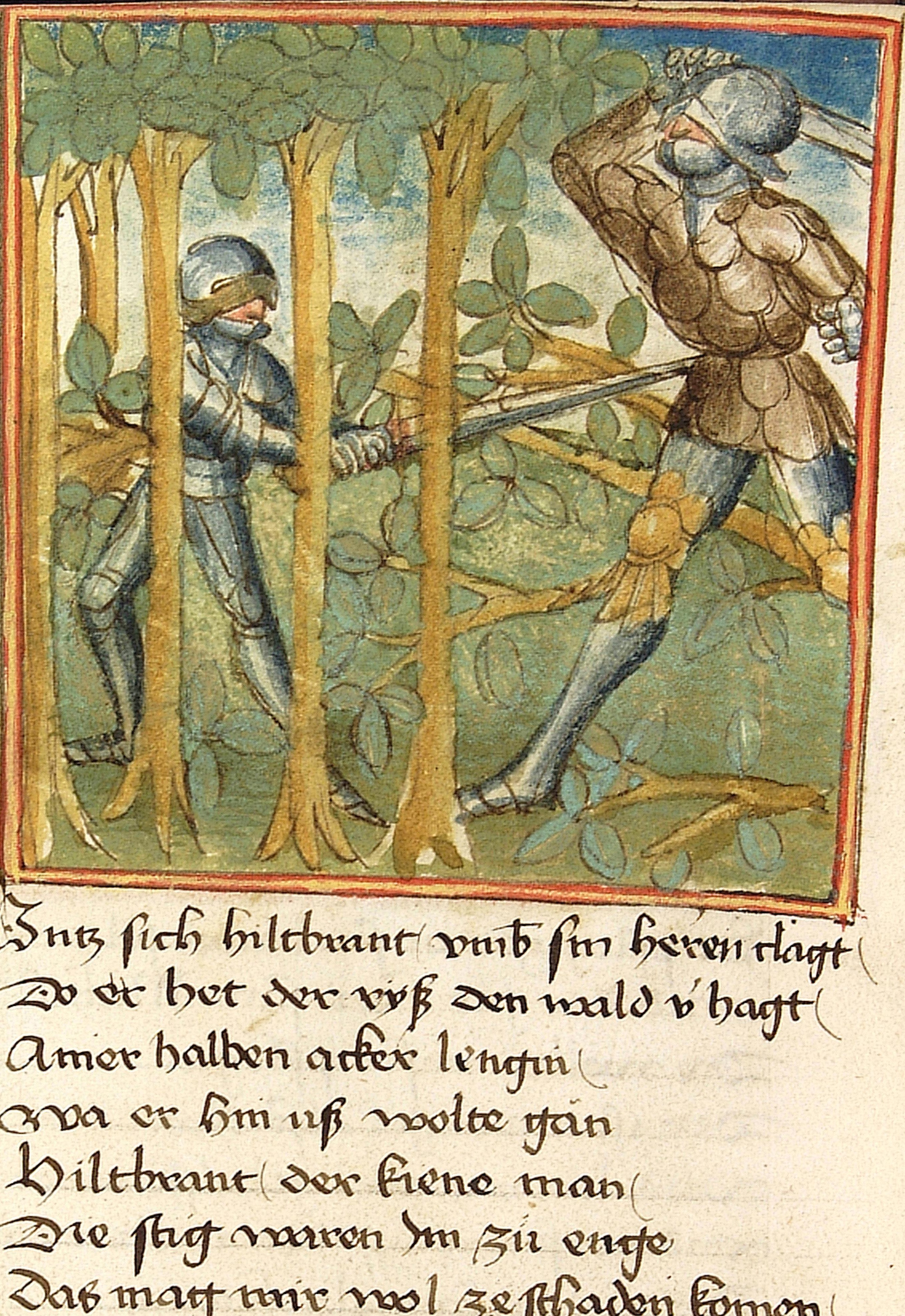
Sigenot destroys the forest fighting Hildebrand. Cpg. 67 fol. 77v.

Sigenot is an anonymous Middle High German poem about the legendary hero Dietrich von Bern, the counterpart of the historical Ostrogothic king Theodoric the Great in Germanic heroic legend. It is one of the so-called fantastical (aventiurehaft) Dietrich poems, so called because it more closely resembles a courtly romance than a heroic epic. It was likely written in the Alemannic dialect area, no later than 1300.

The poem concerns Dietrich's fight with the eponymous giant Sigenot, who defeats Dietrich and takes him prisoner. Dietrich must be rescued by his mentor Hildebrand, who himself is defeated by the giant but manages to escape with the help of the dwarf Eggerich and kill the giant.

The Sigenot exists in two principal versions. It was by far the most popular of all Dietrich poems, being transmitted in eight extant manuscripts and twenty-one printings until 1661. It inspired various artistic depictions as well. It is nevertheless not regarded very highly as a work of art and has received little scholarly attention.

== Summary ==
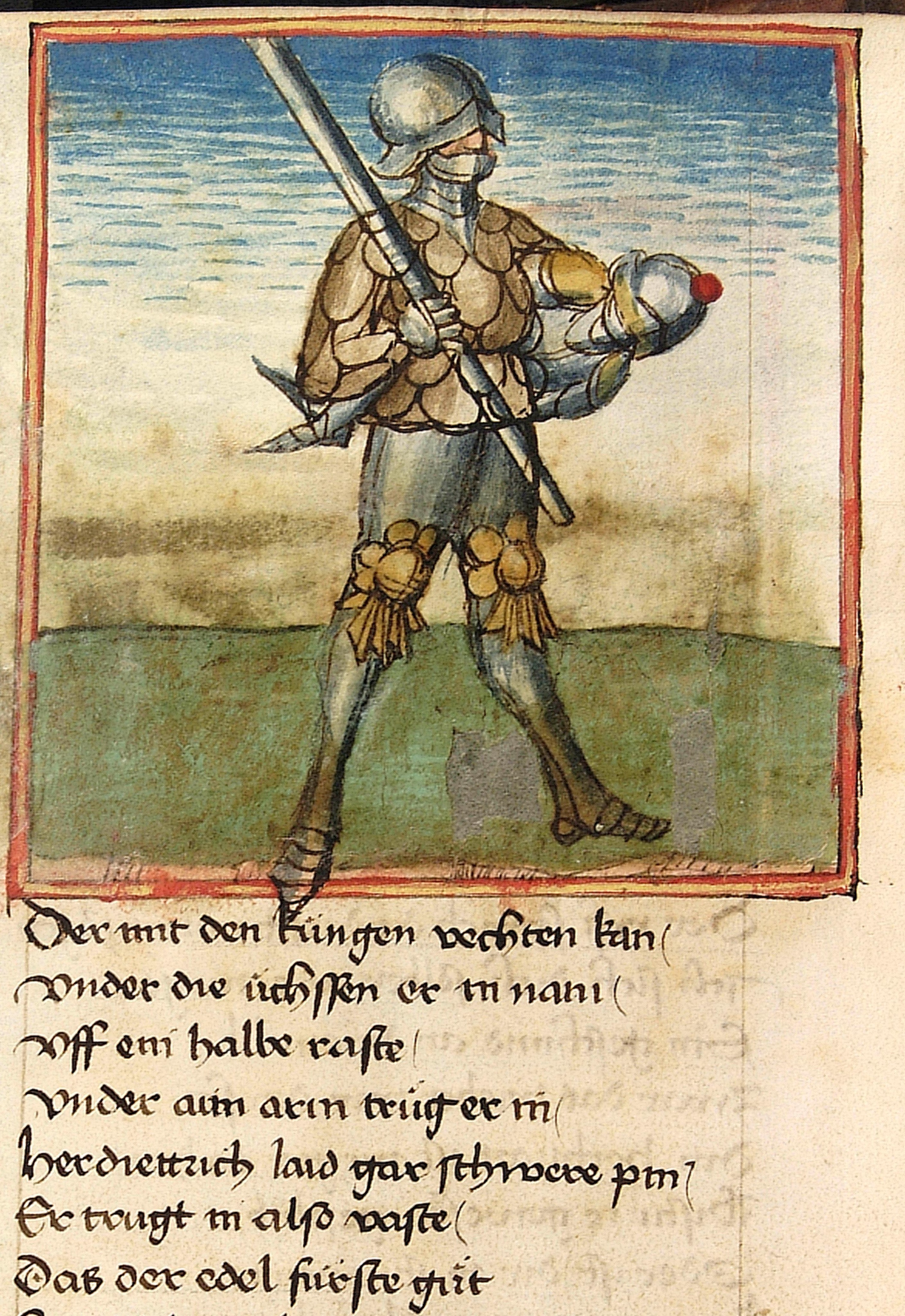
Sigenot carries Dietrich after defeating him. Cpg 67 fol. 55v

The poem exists in two principal versions: the so-called elder Sigenot (älterer Sigenot), and the younger Sigenot (jüngerer Sigenot) (see "Transmission, versions, and dating" below).

In the älterer Sigenot, Dietrich awakens the giant Sigenot in the forest by kicking him. The giant then recognizes Dietrich by the coat of arms on his shield as the slayer of Hilde and Grim, two giant relatives of his, and forces Dietrich to fight him, despite a sudden reluctance (zagheit) on Dietrich's part. Dietrich is thrown into a dungeon. Sigenot now heads to Bern (Verona) to defeat Hildebrand, and, encountering him in the forest, takes him prisoner as well. However, once Hildebrand has been dragged to Dietrich's prison, he is able to free himself, slays the giant and frees Dietrich with the help of the dwarf Duke Eggerich. The two heroes then return to Bern.

In the jüngerer Sigenot, the poem begins with Hildebrand telling Dietrich about Sigenot. He warns him not to go into the forest to fight the giant. Dietrich ignores this advice and sets out to find Sigenot. Then, before encountering the giant, Dietrich fights a wild man who is keeping the dwarf Baldung captive. As a reward, the dwarf gives Dietrich a protective jewel and directs him to Sigenot. Dietrich fights Sigenot and is taken prisoner. Sigenot throws Dietrich into a snake pit, but the jewel protects him. Sigenot decides to head for Bern. Hildebrand, now worried by Dietrich's long absence, sets out to find him: on the way he encounters Sigenot and is taken prisoner. Left alone in Sigenot's cave, Hildebrand frees himself and dresses in Dietrich's armor. He then slays Sigenot and frees Dietrich with Eggerich's help.

== Transmission, versions, and dating ==
The Sigenot exists in two overarching versions, the so-called "older Sigenot" and the "younger Sigenot" (jüngerer Sigenot). Because of the heavy variability between manuscripts in the fantastical Dietrich poems, each individual manuscript can be considered to be a "version" of these two overarching versions. Formerly, it was believed that the "younger Sigenot" represented an expansion of the shorter version found in the "older Sigenot". Now the "younger Sigenot is widely believed to be the older version of the two. Given the age of the first manuscript, the poem must have existed before 1300, most likely in the Swabian-Alemannic dialect area. Like almost all German heroic poems, it is anonymous.

The "older Sigenot is attested in one manuscript:

- S_{1} (L): Badische Landesbibliothek Karlsruhe, Cod. Donaueschingen 74. Parchment, c. 1300, East Alemannic dialect (from Konstanz?). Contains various literary texts, including the Sigenot followed by the Eckenlied.

It is likely that this version of 44 stanzas has been deliberately shortened to serve as an introduction or prologue to the Eckenlied, which follows it in the manuscript. The final stanza of the poem includes an explicit mention that the Eckenlied will begin next.

The "younger Sigenot has around 2000 stanzas, varying by attestation, and is attested in all the remaining manuscripts and printings:

- S_{2} (s, s_{1}): Heldenbuch written by Diebolt von Hanowe. Formerly Strasbourg City/Seminary Library, destroyed 1870.
- S_{3} (hs_{1}): Universitätsbibliothek Heidelberg, Cpg 67. Paper, around 1470, Swabian dialect.
- S_{4} (m): Württembergische Landesbibliothek Stuttgart, Cod. theol. et phil. 8° 5. Contains various theological texts, several stanzas of the Sigenot are on the spill pages.
- S_{5} (v): Staatsbibliothek Berlin, Ms. germ 4° 1107. Paper, 1459, from Ulm(?). Contains various songs, short narrative texts, including the Sigenot with lacunae and the Jüngeres Hildebrandslied.
- S_{6} (d): The Dresdner Heldenbuch. Sächsische Landesbibliothek Dresden, Msc. M 201. Paper, 1472, from Nuremberg(?).
- S_{7} (p): formerly Národní knihovna České republiky Prague LXIX D 5 Nr. 48. Lost. Fragment of a paper manuscript, fifteenth century, East Franconian dialect.
- S_{8} (r): Stadtarchiv Dinkelsbühl, B 259 (IV) - accounting book, a stanza of the Sigenot is written between two entries for the year 1482.

There are also more than 21 printings, with the last being printed in Nuremberg in 1661.

== Scholarly reception ==
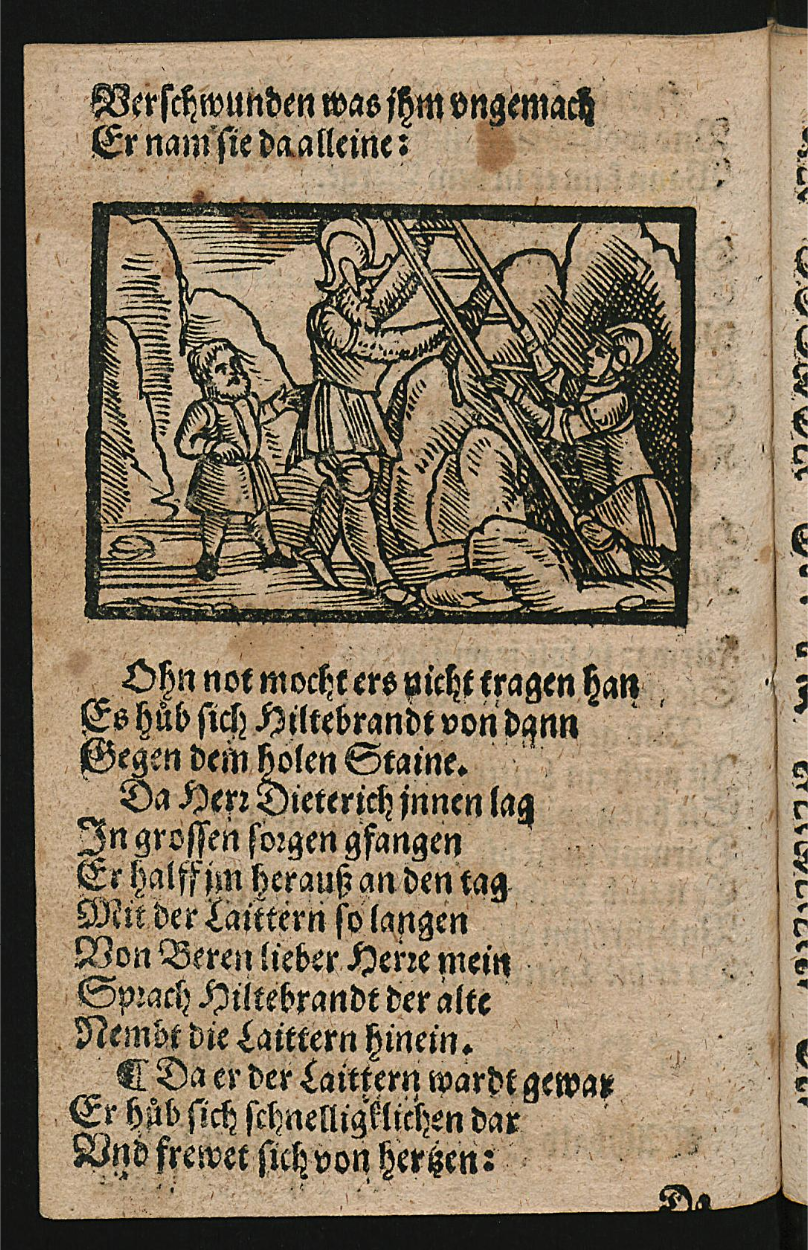
Hildebrand rescues Dietrich from the snake pit. Woodcut from a 1606 printing of Sigenot. Staatsblibliothek Berlin Yf 7808

Although the Sigenot was one of the most popular poems about Dietrich von Bern, it has not been treated kindly by scholars, with both Joachim Heinzle and Victor Millet dismissing it as uninteresting.

The poem shows little self-reflexively: Hildebrand stylizes the fight against giants as the chief task of any hero. The text also includes some comical elements, as when Sigenot is able to carry Dietrich under his arm, or when Dietrich's fiery breath, with which he defeated Siegfried in the Rosengarten zu Worms, proves useless against the giant. That Dietrich and Hildebrand together defeat the giant likely shows the solidarity of the noble warriors rather than any suggestion of Dietrich's inadequacy.

== Metrical form ==
Like the majority of German heroic epics, the Sigenot is written in stanzas. The poem is composed in a stranzaic form known as the "Berner Ton," which consists of 13 lines in the following rhyme scheme: aabccbdedefxf. It shares this metrical form with the poems Goldemar, Eckenlied, and Virginal. Early modern melodies for the "Berner Ton" have survived, indicating that it was meant to be sung. The following stanza from S_{1} connecting that poem to the Eckenlied can stand in as an example:

Hie mite schieden si von dan a (four feet)
her Dieterîch und der wîse man, a (four feet)
hin gên der stat ze Berne. b (three feet)
dâ wurden sî enpfangen wol c (four feet)
mit vröuden, als man herren sol c (four feet)
enpfân und sehen gerne. b (three feet)
sus klagten sî ir ungemach d (four feet)
den rittern und den vrouwen e (three feet)
daz in in dem walde geschach d (four feet)
und wie si muosten schouwen e (three feet)
grôze nôt, von der sî schiet f (four feet)
her Hiltebrant ûz sorgen. x (three feet)
sus hebet sich ECKEN LIET. f (three feet)

== Relation to the Oral Tradition ==
Werner Hoffmann describes the entire poem as an invention of the thirteenth century, as there are no attestations for a giant named Sigenot or a dwarf named Eggerich before the poem. However, the poem may connect to Dietrich's captivity among giants, as referenced in the Waldere and found in Virginal: Joachim Heinzle suggests that it was created in the 13th century under the influence of this traditional story. The text also makes reference to Dietrich's battle with Hilde and Grim, which is told in the Thidrekssaga and referenced in the Eckenlied, but about which no poem survives. The story of Hilde and Grim functions as a sort of prequel to Sigenot, showing an attempt to connect the poems together in a cycle. Victor Millet suggests that there may never have been a written poem about Hilde and Grim; the tale may have been a purely oral one and well known to the Sigenot's audience In the Thidrekssaga, Hilde and Grim are said to give their name to Dietrich's helmet, the Hildegrim; George Gillespie argues that they are likely a late addition to the oral tradition in order to explain the meaning of name Hildegrim (meaning battle specter) once this was no longer obvious.

== Artistic Reception ==
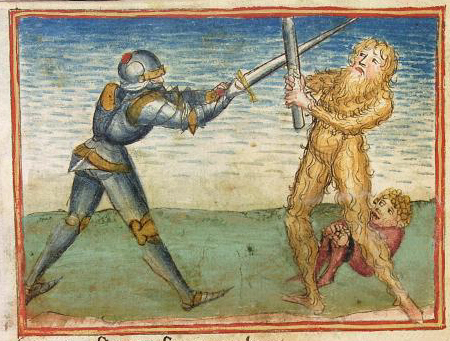
Dietrich fights the wild man before encountering Sigenot (Cod. Pal. germ. 67, fol. 19r).

Count Gottfried Werner von Zimmern commissioned a cycle of frescoes in Wildenstein Castle, probably in the 1520s. The frescoes, of which 32 survive in poor condition, were perhaps based on the woodcuts found in the printing of 1520.

The late manuscript hs_{1} (S_{3}), created for Margaret of Savoy has been extensively illuminated, with around 201 miniatures. Nearly every stanza of the poem is accompanied with an illumination. The illuminations are very similar to each other on each page, showing every stage of the poem's narrative, so that one gets the impression of a series of film stills. The illuminations appear to be from the workshop of Ludwig Henfflin.

== Editions ==
- Schoener, Clemens, ed. (1928). Der jüngere Sigenot, nach sämtlichen handschriften und drucken. Heidelberg: Winter.
- Heinzle; Joachim, eds. (1978). Der ältere und der jüngere "Sigenot": Aus der Donaueschinger Handschrift 74 und dem Strassburger Druck von 1577 in Abbildungen. Göppingen: Kümmerle. ISBN 3874524256.
- Zupitza, Julius, ed. (1870). "Sigenot". Das Heldenbuch, fünfter Teil: Dietrichs Abenteuer von Albrecht von Kemenaten nebst den Bruchstücken von Dietrich und Wenezlan. Berlin: Weidmann. pp. 207–215.
