= Hildebrand =

Character in Germanic heroic legends

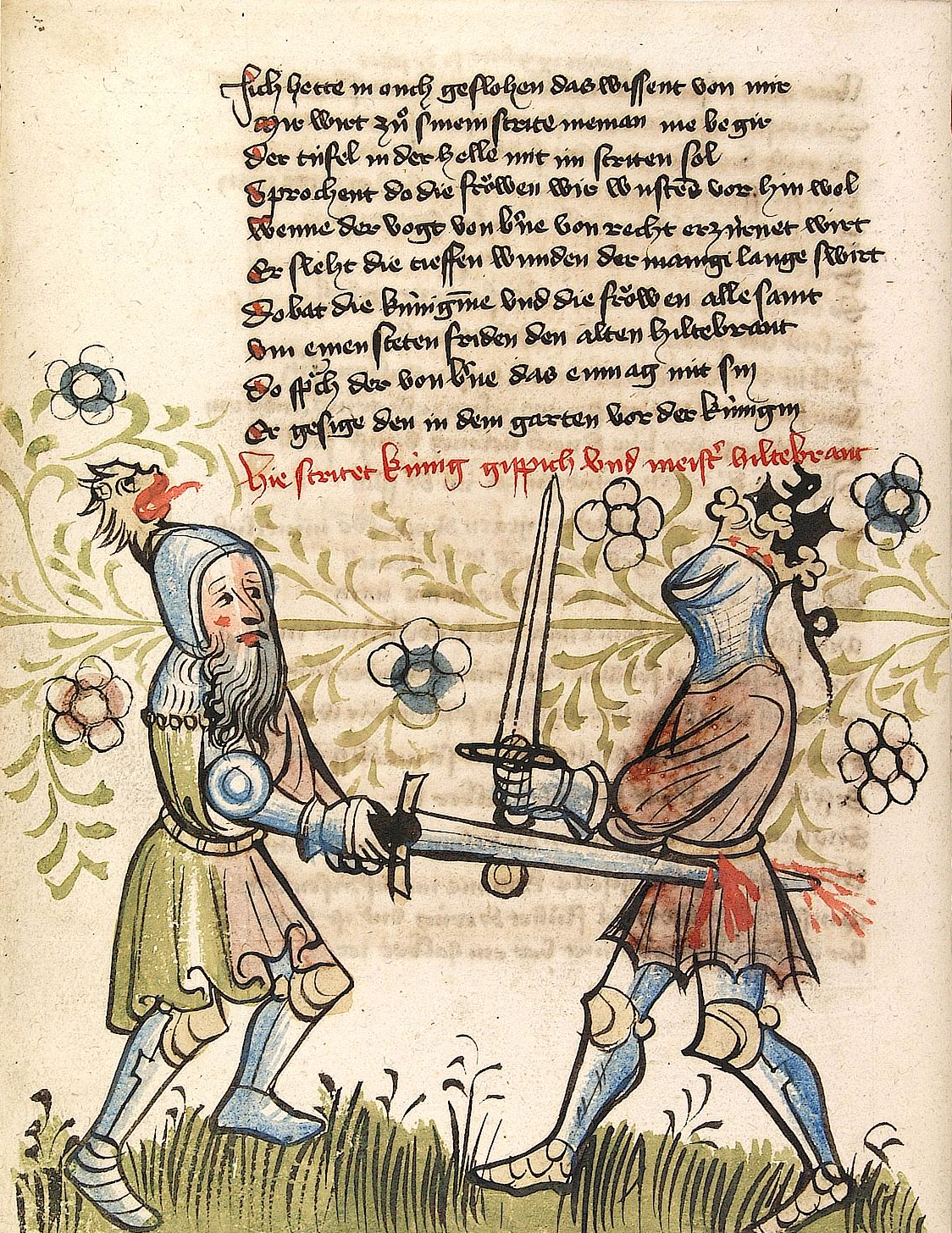
Hildebrand battles King Gibica in Rosengarten zu Worms

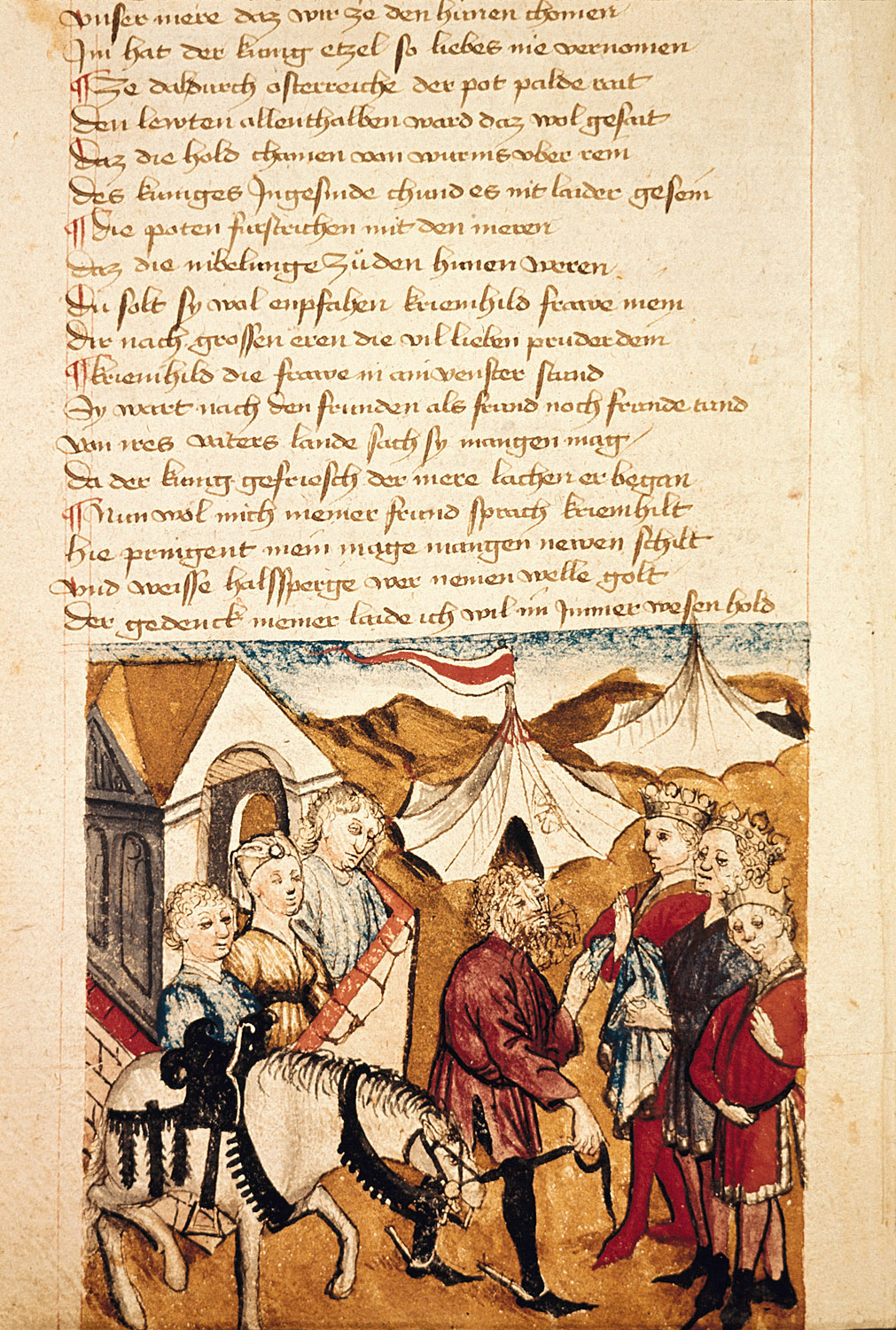
Hildebrand warns the Burgundians Hundeshagenscher Kodex

Hildebrand is a character from Germanic heroic legend. Hildebrand is the modern German form of the name: in Old High German it is Hiltibrant and in Old Norse Hildibrandr. The word hild means "battle" and brand means "sword". The name itself is very likely of Lombardic origin.

He is associated with the cycle of legends about Theodoric the Great, called Dietrich in German, to whom he is a companion. Hildebrand appears in many works, most prominently in the Old High German Hildebrandslied, the Middle High German Nibelungenlied, in the Old Norse song "Hildebrand's Death" in Ásmundar saga kappabana (called Hildibrandr), and in the late medieval Jüngeres Hildebrandslied. He also appears as Hildiger in Gesta Danorum.

In the Nibelungenlied, he is the armourer, brother-in-arms, and fatherly friend of Dietrich von Bern. Hildebrand kills Kriemhild, after she orders her brother's death and then kills Hagen herself. Hildebrand plays a supporting role to Dietrich in the numerous poems of the Dietrich cycle; in poems such as Virginal and Sigenot, Hildebrand tutors the young Dietrich and saves him from various scrapes.

In the Hildebrandslied, which is older, Hildebrand fights his own son Hadubrand. Hildebrand had gone into exile with Dietrich. 30 years later, Hildebrand returns and encounters his son Hadubrand, who is leading his army against Hildebrand. The two leaders meet between the armies. They converse before fighting, and Hadubrand says that he is "Hadubrand Hildebrand's son", but he was told that Hildebrand died, and he accuses Hildebrand of being an old Hun and refuses to believe that he is his father. The poem ends before a conclusion is reached, but in "Hildebrand's Death" it is related that he killed his son. The Old Norse Thidrekssaga and the Jüngeres Hildebrandslied both contain versions in which Hildebrand defeats his son (here named Alebrand) but does not kill him.

The Scandinavian song "Hildebrand's death" tells how Hildebrand fights against his half-brother. He is wounded fatally by him and the shield with the picture of his son falls near to his head on the ground. He begs his half-brother to cover his body, and to bury him properly.

Although associated with historical characters from the 5th and 6th centuries, Theodoric and Odoacer, Hildebrand himself has not been identified as a historical personage.
