= Fasolt =

Character in German folklore

Fasolt, Fasold or Vasolt is a giant or knight who appears in the following works:

- The Middle High German heroic poem Eckenlied (c. 1230).
- The Old Norse compendium of German legends known as the Thidrekssaga (c. 1250).
- Richard Wagner's opera Das Rheingold (1869).

The name Fasolt likely derives from a root similar to Old High German faso, thread, and most likely refers to the long braided hair he is described as having in the Eckenlied. He may have originally been a storm demon, as evidenced by a 17th-century prayer to witches at the mountain Jochgrimm outside of Bozen to cause "ffasolt" to send storms far away.
