= Virginal (poem) =

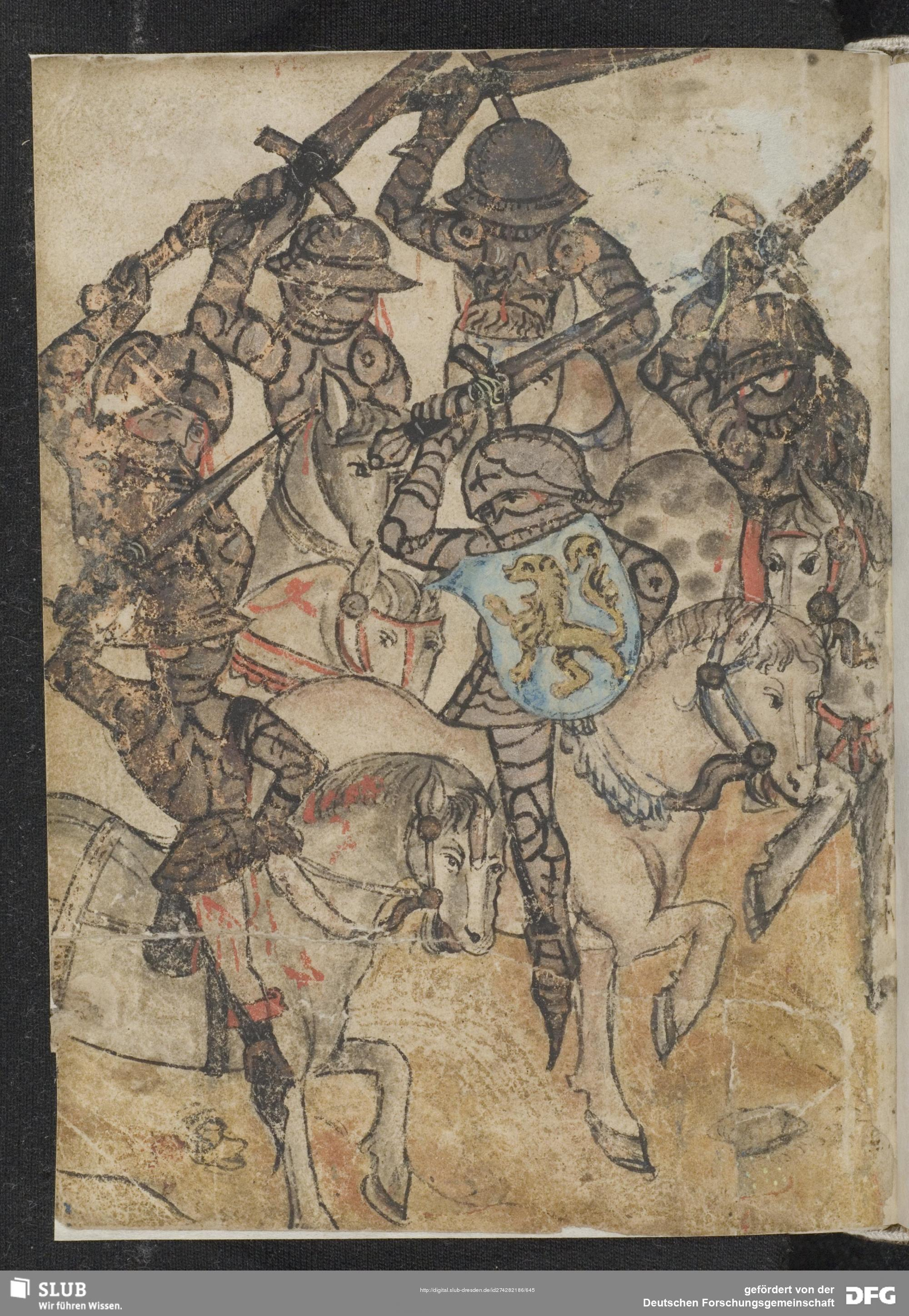
Dietrich fights with six enemies. Title illumination to Virginal in the Dresdner Heldenbuch. SLUB Mscr. Dresd. M. 201 fol. 313v.

Virginal, also known as Dietrichs erste Ausfahrt (Dietrich's first quest), or Dietrich und seine Gesellen (Dietrich and his companions) is an anonymous Middle High German poem about the legendary hero Dietrich von Bern, the counterpart of the historical Ostrogothic king Theodoric the Great in Germanic heroic legend. It is one of the so-called fantastical (aventiurehaft) Dietrich poems, so called because it more closely resembles a courtly romance than a heroic epic. The poem was composed by 1300 at the latest, and may have been composed as early as the second quarter of the thirteenth century.

There are three principal versions of the Virginal. The poem concerns the still young and inexperienced Dietrich's quest to save the dwarf queen Virginal in Tyrol from a force of attacking heathens. After defeating the heathens, Dietrich encounters a series of further adventures while trying to reach Virginal's court, including, depending on version, his capture by giants, and his rescue of the hero Rentwin out of the mouth of a dragon. When he finally reaches Virginal's court, Dietrich marries Virginal in two of the three versions.

== Summary ==
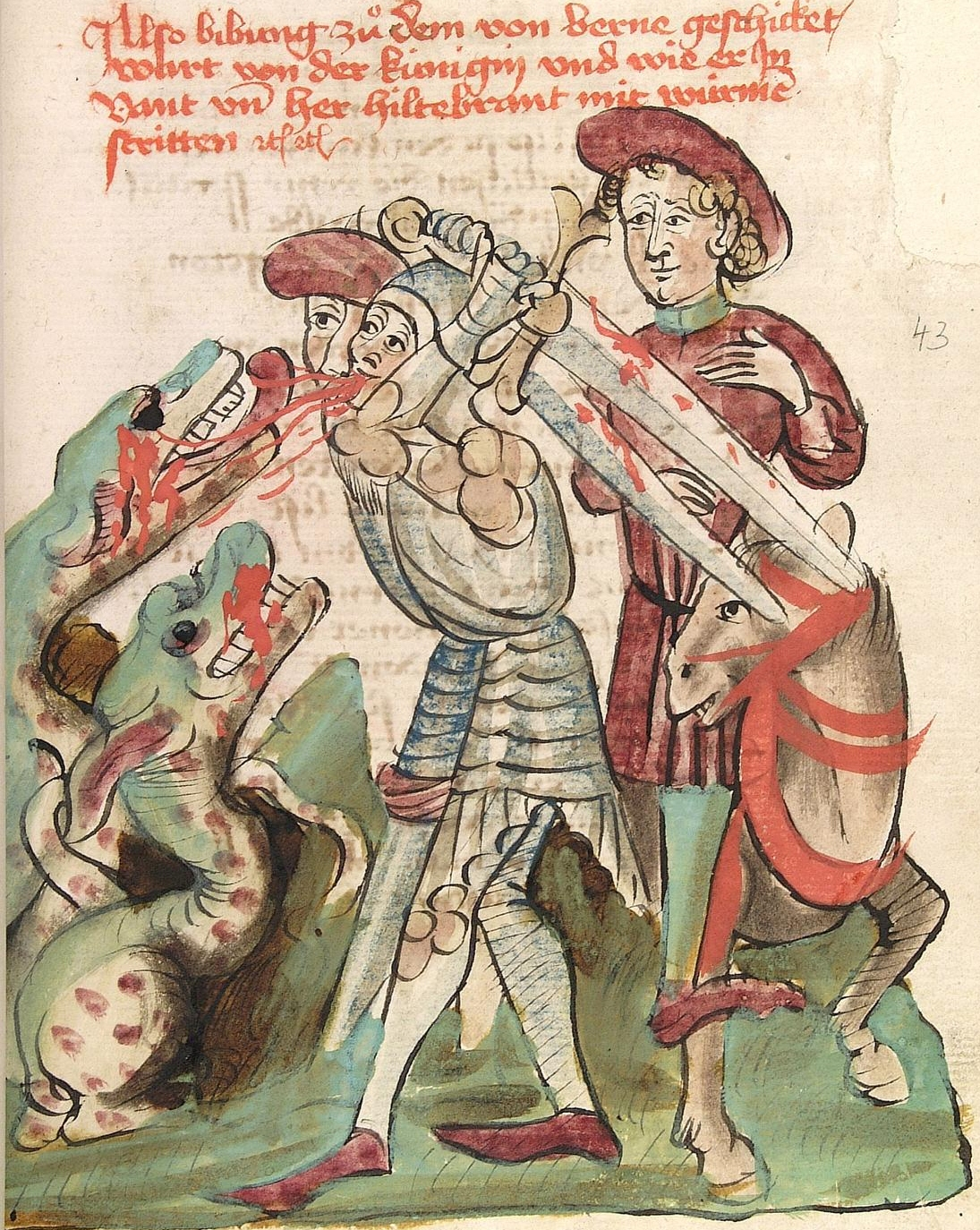
Dietrich von Bern and Hildebrand fight against dragons. UBH Cod.Pal.germ. 324 Virginal, fol. 43r

There are three complete versions of the Virginal, the Heidelberg, the Vienna, and the Dresden versions. Here follows a summary of each version.

Heidelberg Version (V_{10}): Young Dietrich does not yet know what adventure (Middle High German "âventiure") means, so Hildebrand takes him into the wooded mountains of Tyrol to fight against the heathen Orkise, who has invaded the kingdom of the dwarf king Virginal and demands a virgin as tribute to eat. Hildebrand finds a girl who is being sacrificed to Orkise, and slays a group of heathens who have come to collect her. Hildebrand returns to Dietrich, only to discover that his pupil is himself under attack—with Hildebrand's help, Dietrich defeats the heathens. The girl invites Dietrich and Hildebrand to Virginal's palace at Jeraspunt, heading there herself as messenger to announce the heroes. Virginal sends the dwarf Bibung as a messenger to Dietrich and Hildebrand. When Bibung finds the heroes, they are in the midst of fighting a swarm of dragons. Hildebrand rescues a knight who has been half-swallowed by a dragon. The knight is named Rentwin, son of Helferich von Lune und der Portalaphe, and thus great nephew of Hildebrand. He invites his rescuers to his father's castle at Arona. Bibung also goes to the castle, bringing Virginal's invitation. Dietrich rides alone ahead when the heroes head to Virginal's palace, and gets lost, arriving at the castle Muter. There the giant Wicram, together with other giants, overpowers him and takes him captive on behalf of his master, Nitger. Meanwhile, the other heroes arrive at Jeraspunt and notice that Dietrich is missing. In Muter, Nitger's sister Ibelin takes care of Dietrich, and with her help he is able to send a message to his friends telling them of his predicament. Hildebrand and Helferich decide to gather a force to free Dietrich, calling for the aid King Imian of Hungary, Witege, Heime, and Biterolf and Dietleib. The heroes go to Muter and arrange combat with Nitger. There are eleven cases of single combat, with Nitger even allowing Dietrich himself to fight, and all the giants are slain. The heroes head back to Jeraspunt, on the way slaying even more dragons and giants. Finally, there is an enormous feast at Virginal's palace. However, Dietrich receives news of a threatened siege of Bern (Verona), so Dietrich must hurry back home to further hardships.

Dresden Virginal (V_{11}): The Dresden version has been radically reduced in length by the scribe of the Dresdner Heldenbuch. This version does not contain the episode of Dietrich's capture at Muter. During Dietrich's stay at Arona, further adventures are told: Dietrich is challenged by Prince Libertin of Palermo, defeats him, and becomes his friend. Hildebrand, Helferich, Rentwin, and Libertin are invited to the castle Orteneck by the heathen Janapas, Orkise's son, while they were heading to Jeraspunt. The heathen ambushes them there, and the heroes must fight against lions and heathens. Their victory frees three maidens who the heathens had taken from Virginal. Dietrich, meanwhile, fights a ferocious boar and then a giant, who objects to Dietrich hunting on his land, while all this is happening. Dietrich defeats the giant as his friends arrive and see, taking the giant captive. The heroes finally arrive at Jeraspunt, where Dietrich marries Virginal. For two nights he is unable to consummate his union, while Hildebrand hides under the bed and counsels the young warrior. On the third night, he is successful.

Vienna Virginal (V_{12}): A much longer version of the events also contained in the Dresden version, but without detail that Dietrich was at first unable to consummate his marriage. It also contains the Muter episode.

== Transmissions, Versions, and Dating ==
The Virginal must have been composed prior by 1300 at the latest, based on the dating of the earliest fragments. Because of the oldest fragments of the poem come from the Swabian-Alemannic area, the poem is thought to have been composed there. Like almost all German heroic poetry, the Virginal is anonymous.

The three complete manuscripts, the Heidelberg V_{10}, Dresden V_{11}, and Vienna V_{12} versions, each contains an independent version of the poem. Most of the fragments match the Heidelberg version most closely, but due to the extreme variability of the fantastical Dietrich epic, each individual manuscript can be considered an equally valid version.

The Virginal has the following manuscript attestations:

- V_{1} (U): University College London, Ms. Frag. Germ. 2. Fragment of a parchment manuscript, first half of the fourteenth century. Alemannic dialect.
- V_{2} (D): Badische Landesbibliothek Karlsruhe, Cod. Donaueschingen 91. Fragment of a parchment manuscript, first half of the fourteenth century. Alemannic dialect.
- V_{3} (B): formerly Archive of the Evangelical-Lutheran Dekanat Ansbach. First half of the 14th century, Rhine-Franconian dialect. Fragmentary oldest Heldenbuch. Lost.
- V_{4} (M): Kathedral-Pfarramt St. Stephanus in Grevenbroich(-Elsen). Fragment of a paper manuscript, beginning of fourteenth century, Rhine-Franconian or Alemannic dialect.
- V_{5} (n): Germanisches Nationalmuseum Nuremberg, Hs. 80. Fragment of a paper manuscript, around 1355-1357, Swabian dialect. Contains the only surviving fragment of Goldemar, the Virginal, and various medical recipes and a glossary of plant names.
- V_{6} (L): Universitätsbibliothek Leipzig, Rep. II fol. 70a. Fragment of a parchment manuscript, middle of fourteenth century, probably from the Mid-Rhine region. Known as the "Niederrheinische Liederhandschrift:" a collection of lyric, including parts of the Virginal.
- V_{7}: (E): Kongelige Bibliotek Kopenhagen, Fragmenter 18 I; and Hessisches Staatsarchiv Marburg, Bestand 147 Hr 1 Nr. 6; and Klosterbibliothek Erbstorf, VI 8a. Parchment, fifteenth century, Bavarian dialect. Fragment of a manuscript containing various literary texts, including the Rosengarten zu Worms and Virginal.
- V_{8}: Bibliothek der Abtei Metten, Fragm. Cart. I. Fragment of a paper manuscript, around 1400, Rhine-Franconian dialect.
- V_{9} (s/f): Württembergische Landesbibliothek Stuttgart, HB VII 37 and Cod. Fragm. 63; and Universitätsbibliothek Freiburg im Breisgau, Hs. 531. Fragment of a paper manuscript, first half of the fifteenth century, Swabian dialect.
- V_{10} (h): Universitätsbibliothek Heidelberg, Cpg. 324. paper, around 1440, from the manuscript workshop of Diebolt Lauber in Hagenau.
- V_{11} (d): The Dresdner Heldenbuch. Sächsische Landesbibliothek Dresden, Msc. M 201. Paper, 1472, from Nuremberg(?).
- V_{12} (w): Linhart Scheubel's Heldenbuch: Österreichische Nationalbibliothek Wienna, Cod. 15478. Paper, around 1480-1490, from Nuremberg.
- V_{13}: Staats- und Stadtbibliothek Augsburg, Fragm. germ. 33. Fragment of a parchment manuscript, first half of the fourteenth century, Bavarian dialect.

== Interpretation ==
Older scholarship believed that the Virginal consisted of three originally separate parts: Dietrich's fight against Orkise, his rescue of Rentwin, and his captivity at Muter. Considerable efforts were spent trying to discern when these three stories came to be attached to the poem, with the fight against Orkise generally being supposed to have been written first, with the Rentwin and the Muter episodes added later based on stories in oral circulation. Joachim Heinzle dismisses such attempts to differentiate separate layers of the poem over time as setting an impossible task.

More recent scholarship has focused on the Virginal's portrayal of Dietrich's learning the meaning of adventure: Victor Millet notes that the various episodes introduce Dietrich to almost all possible kinds of battles. The characterization of Dietrich as still inexperienced and young makes the poem into a sort of pedagogical exercise. The discussion of adventure (Middle High German âventiure) is, moreover, a metaliterary discussion, with Dietrich's adventures in the story being inspired by his inability to narrate adventures. The Heidelberg version accentuates this theme by filling the poem with letters and oral messages that retell elements of the story to characters absent at the time of those events.

The poem also shows Dietrich's continued resistance to courtly love service and chivalry in the service of ladies, topics also found in the Goldemar fragment and the Eckenlied. While the Vienna and Dresden versions end with Dietrich marrying Virginal, in the Heidelberg version he successfully resists the narrative expectation that he ought to marry Virginal after rescuing her. The poem emphasizes the fellowship of the heroic warriors, particularly between Dietrich and Hildebrand, as the heroes join forces to defeat adversaries such as Orkise or the giants at Muter. The defeat of giants and heathens, moreover, appears to be a duty for Dietrich as a ruler.

The Heidelberg version shows a tendency toward realism, particularly when Dietrich must abruptly leave Virginal to save his kingdom from an unnamed threat. He is thus taken back out of the world of fantastical adventure to the world of real concerns such as war.

== Metrical Form ==
Like the majority of German heroic epics, the Virginal is written in stanzas. The poem is composed in a stanzaic form known as the "Berner Ton," which consists of 13 lines in the following rhyme scheme: aabccbdedefxf. It shares this metrical form with the poems Goldemar, Sigenot, and Eckenlied. Early modern melodies for the "Berner Ton" have survived, indicating that it was meant to be sung. The following stanza of the Eckenlied can stand in as a typical example:

Ez sâzen helde in eime sal, a (four feet)
sî retten wunder âne zal a (four feet)
von ûz erwelten recken. b (three feet)
der eine was sich her Vâsolt c (four feet)
(dem wâren schoene vrouwen holt), c (four feet)
daz ander was her Ecke, b (three feet)
daz dritte der wild Ebenrôt. d (four feet)
sî retten al gelîche e (three feet)
daz nieman küener waer ze nôt, d (four feet)
den von Berne her Dieterîche: e (three feet)
der waer ein helt übr alliu lant. f (four feet)
sô waer mit listen küene x (three feet)
der alte Hiltebrant. f (three feet)

== Relation to the Oral Tradition ==
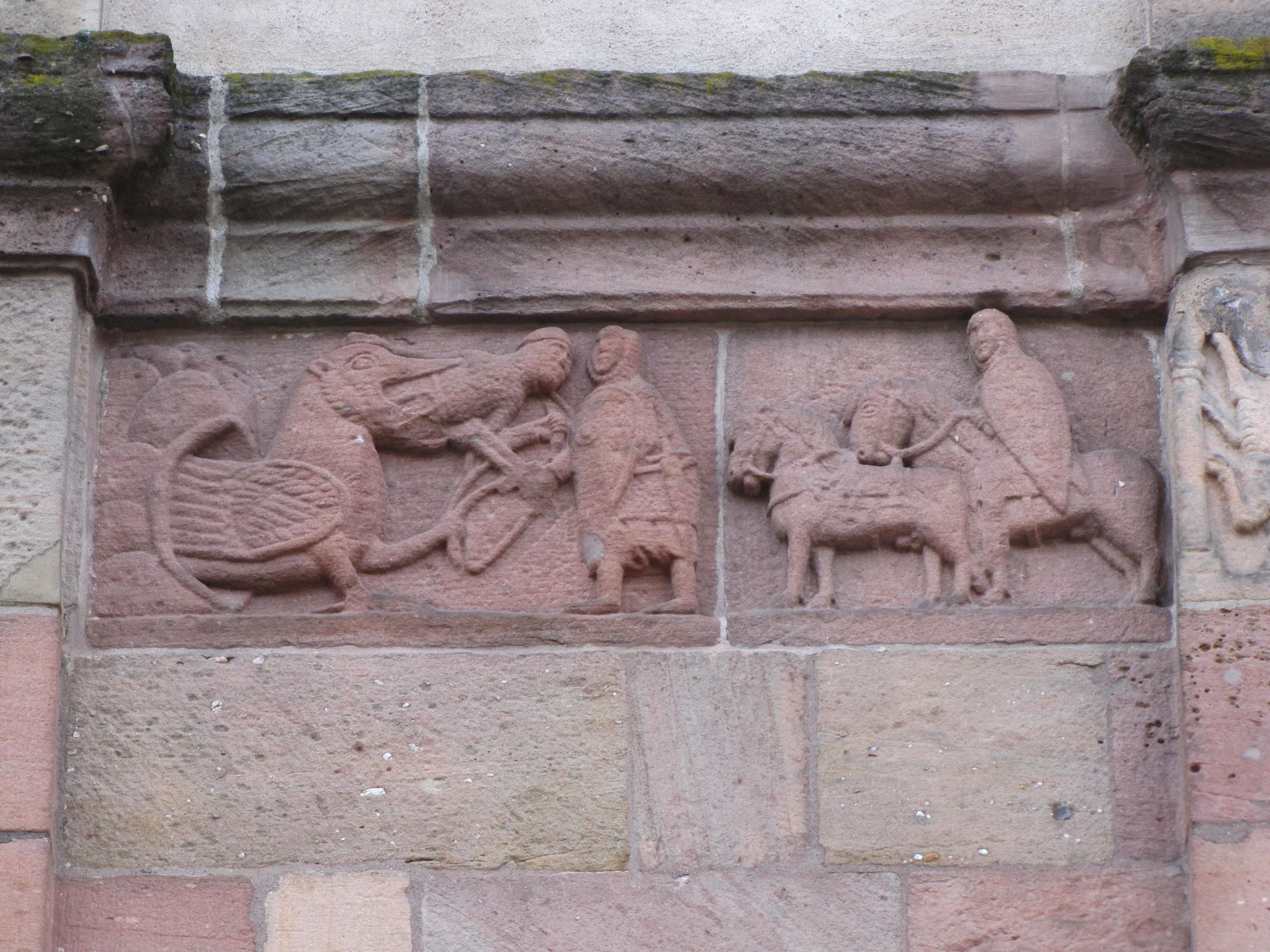
Exterior Sculpture of Église Saints-Pierre-et-Paul dite Sainte-Richarde in Andlau, Alsace, possibly inspired by the scene of Hildebrand saving Rentwin recorded in Virginal

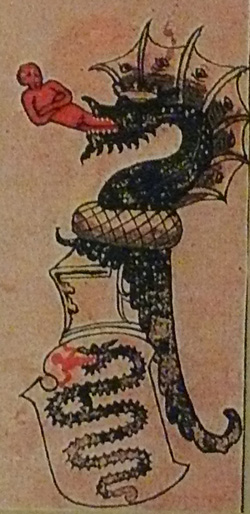
Coat of arms of the Visconti of Milan depicting the biscione, a serpent who appears to be swallowing a human

Dietrich's captivity among giants is an extremely old part of the oral tradition surrounding him, being referenced in the Old English Waldere, where Witege saves him. In the Virginal, Witege is still involved in the rescue, though he plays no special role. Another version of Dietrich's captivity by giants is found in the Sigenot. The giant Wicram, in taking Dietrich captive, references Dietrich having killed his kinsmen in Britanje: this may be a reference to Dietrich's adventures in Bertangenland recounted in the Thidrekssaga. Its presence here contradicts the claim made at the beginning of the Virginal that this is Dietrich's first adventure.

The tale connecting Dietrich to the rescue a man half-swallowed by a serpent or dragon appears to be part of a widespread oral tradition about Dietrich. This image first occurs on an exterior frieze at the Alsatian abbey of Andlau (c. 1130/40?) and on the capital of a column in the cathedral of Basel (after 1185): this could be a depiction of this story about Dietrich, but might also be a general depiction of good vanquishing evil. Lienert dismisses these sculptural depictions as unrelated to Dietrich. Another version of the same story is also found in the Thidrekssaga: there Dietrich and Fasolt come across the knight Sintram, Hilderband's nephew, in the mouth of a dragon. Fasolt rescues the Sintram with the use of a sword stuck in the dragon's mouth. Sintram also appears as the name of the man being swallowed by the dragon also in a 15th-century Swiss chronicle, by the Bernese Chronicle of Konrad Justinger, which relocates the action to Bern, Switzerland, and does not include Dietrich's name. It is thus not clear if the motif was transferred onto Dietrich from an independent legend or whether the Swiss version had lost the original connection with Dietrich. In the Virginal, the presence of this story may be connected to the coat of arms of the Visconti, which depicts a man being swallowed by a dragon. The Visconti were in possession of the case of Arona (Arone) at the time of the Virginal's composition, and this is the castle where Rentwin and his father Helferich live. However, this coat of arms is only attested for the Visconti beginning in the fourteenth century. Heinzle dismisses attempts to connect the image to similar stories about Sinbad the Sailor.

19th century scholarship attempted to connect Orkise with Ork, a demon of Tyrolian and North Italian folklore. Joachim Heinzle largely dismisses such speculations, instead preferring to point to the Virginal's use of the motif of a man hunting woman, something also found in Dietrich's opponents the Wunderer and Eckenlied, as well as in certain legends about Dietrich himself.

Although queen Virginal's name strongly resembles the romance word "virgin", it may in fact be connected with Gothic fairguni, meaning mountain. Compare also Anglo-Saxon firgen, meaning mountain woodland.

The poem also has at least one peculiarity: the king of the Hungarians, whom medieval tradition associated with the Huns, is named Imian, not Etzel. This may have been an effort to distance the poem from criticisms that Etzel (Attila) and Dietrich (Theoderic the Great) were not contemporaries.

== Editions ==
- Lienert, Elisabeth; Pontini, Elisa; Schumacher, Katrin, eds. (2017). Virginal. Goldemar. Berlin and Boston: de Gruyter. ISBN 9783110476781. (All versions)
- Kofler, Walter, ed. (2006). "Virginal (Hs. V_{11})". Das Dresdener Heldenbuch und die Bruchstrücke des Berlin-Wolfenbütteler Heldenbuchs: Edition und Digitalfaksimile. Stuttgart: Hirzel. pp. 360–392. ISBN 9783777614359. (The Dresden Virginal)
- von der Hagen, Friedrich Heinrich; Primisser, Anton, eds. (1825). "Dietrich und seine Gesellen". Der Helden Buch in der Ursprache herausgegeben. Vol. 2. Berlin: Reimer. pp. 143–159. (The Dresden Virginal)
- Stark, Franz, ed. (1860). Dietrichs erste Ausfahrt. Stuttgart: Literarischer Verein zu Stuttgart. "dietrichs erste ausfahrt." (The Vienna Virginal)
- Zupitza, Julius, ed. (1870). "Virginal". Das Heldenbuch, fünfter Teil: Dietrichs Abenteuer von Albrecht von Kemenaten nebst den Bruchstücken von Dietrich und Wenezlan. Berlin: Weidmann. pp. 1–200. (The Heidelberg Virginal)
