= Wunderer =

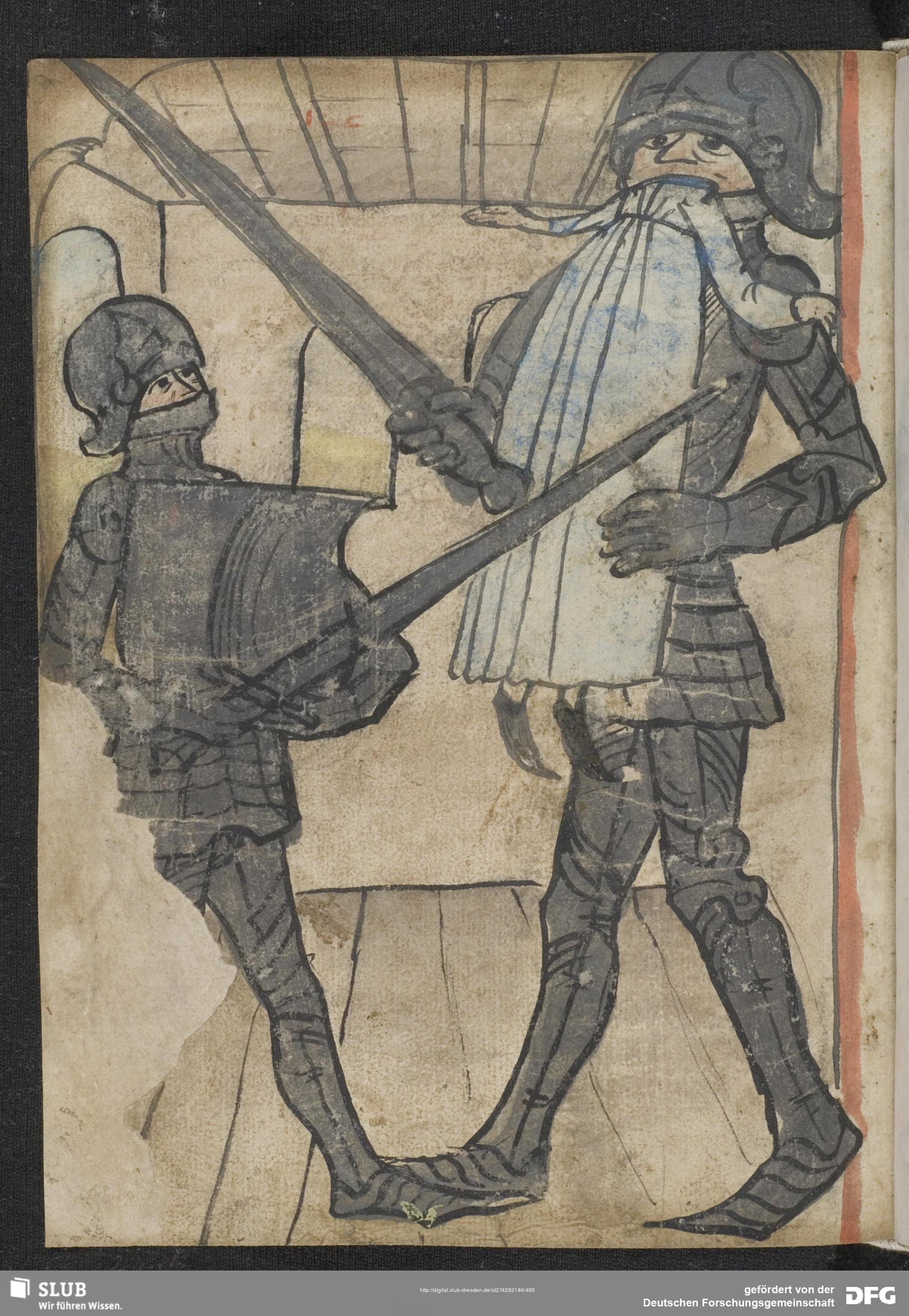
Dietrich fights against the Wunderer, who has begun to eat the maiden, identified as Frau Saelde. SLUB Dresden Mscr. Dresd. M. 201 fol. 240v.

Der Wunderer (the monster), or Etzels Hofhaltung (Etzel's holding of court) is an anonymous Early New High German poem about the legendary hero Dietrich von Bern, the counterpart of the historical Ostrogothic king Theodoric the Great in Germanic heroic legend. It is one of the so-called fantastical (aventiurehaft) Dietrich poems, so called because it more closely resembles a courtly romance than a heroic epic. The poem may have been written before 1300, but is not attested until the turn of the sixteenth century.

The Wunderer concerns an encounter between a young Dietrich and a monster called the Wunderer while Dietrich is staying at Etzel (Attila the Hun)'s court. The Wunderer is hunting and wishes to eat a maiden who later is revealed to be Frau Saelde (Fortuna, Lady Luck, with god-given supernatural powers). When the youthful Dietrich offers to defends her from the Wunderer, she gives him her blessing which renders the recipient invulnerable to death in battle, and he goes on to gain victory.

== Summary ==
At a feast being held by Etzel (Attila), who is described as a greater king than Arthur, a beautiful maiden appears asking for help against the Wunderer, who has been hunting her for three days with his hounds and wants to eat her. This is because she has sworn chastity, and has thus spurned the Wunderer's love. The lady has received three special gifts from this chastity, however: at first glance she can see the true character of a person, her blessing can make anyone invincible in battle, and she can transport herself to any place as swiftly as the wind. The woman sees that Etzel is a coward, and he points her to his heroes. First she asks Rüdiger, but he refuses as well, so Etzel shows her to another room where Dietrich is sitting. Dietrich is ready to fight for the girl if Etzel agrees, but Etzel is worried that Dietrich's relatives would seek revenge should anything happen to Dietrich. At this point, however, the Wunderer breaks into the castle with his hounds. Dietrich then agrees to fight without Etzel's approval, even though he is only fifteen (in some versions, sixteen) years old, and the maiden gives him her blessing of invincibility. The Wunderer now enters the hall where Dietrich and the maiden have been talking, and his hounds attack the maiden's dress. Etzel attempts to satisfy the Wunderer with food. Dietrich kills the Wunderer's hounds, and when the Wunderer seizes the maiden he knocks him down. The Wunderer explains that he is a prince, and the maiden had been promised to him in marriage by her father. When she refused to marry him, he vowed to eat her rather than let her marry another. Dietrich prepares for battle, and the two fight for more than four days (in some version: for two days), until Dietrich finally wins by beheading the Wunderer. There is a large celebration. The lady reveals herself to be Frau Saelde (whose name means "chance" or "luck", thus ≈Fortuna, or "good-luck" personified (Note: Frau Saelde (as Fortuna) is a standard figure in courtly literature (cf. Wigalois). However, it has been pointed out that her role here in this work here as the pursued prey is reminiscent of the Salige Frau of Tyrolean folklore said to be chased and devoured by the wild man (cf. Wild Hunt).)), and the feast ends.

== Transmission, dating, versions ==
The Wunderer may date from as early as the 13th century, but is first attested in the fifteenth. Joachim Heinzle holds the early dating for possible but by no means proven, whereas Victor Millet believes the poem to be a product of the fifteenth century. Like most German heroic poems, the Wunderer is anonymous.

The Wunderer is attested in a version in rhyming couplets and a version in stanzas. The stanzaic version is attested in:

- W_{1} (H): The Dresdener Heldenbuch. Sächsische Landesbibliothek Dresden, Msc. M 201. Paper, 1472, from Nuremberg(?).

And in two later printings:

- w_{2} (B): Strasbourg, o. Dr (Bartholomäus Kistler), 1503.
- w_{3} (H_{1}): Erfurt, Matthes Maler, 1518. Survives as a fragment.

The version in rhyming couplets is attested in:

- W_{2} (K): Bayerische Staatsbibliothek Munich, Cgm. 5919. Paper, beginning of sixteenth century, from Regensburg. Contains both pragmatic and poetic texts, including the Wunderer and Laurin. Incomplete text.

And in one later printings:

- w_{1} (L): Augsburg, Johann Schönsperger, around 1490. Survives as a fragment.

== Generic considerations and literary influence ==
The Wunderer is often noted to be an oddity among the fantastical Dietrich poems. It closely resembles a ballad in length rather than a typical heroic poem. The poem is interesting in its extreme closeness to the paradigm of Arthurian Romance: a lady comes to court asking for help, as in many romances. Etzel is completely inactive, like Arthur, with whom he is expressly compared. Dietrich is not in exile at his court, but rather has been sent there to be educated, something also known from Arthurian romance. It has been suggested that the scene of the Wunderer's arrival at Etzel's castle has been inspired by the late Arthurian German romance Wigamur. Unlike most fantastical Dietrich poems, moreover, Dietrich is not reluctant or cowardly, but rather eager to help the lady in need. The poem appears to be playing a game with established literary figures.

== Metrical Form ==
While one version of the Wunderer is written in rhyming couplets, the other is written in stanzas, as is typical for German heroic poems. The stanzaic Wunderer uses the so-called "Heunenweise" or "Hunnenweise" (the Hunnish melody), a stanza that can be interpreted as consisting of four "Langzeilen:" each line consists of three feet, a caesura, and three additional feet. The word before the caesura rhymes with the word before the caesura on the following line, creating the following rhyme scheme: a||ba||bc||dc||d. It can also be interpreted as consisting of eight short lines with alternating rhymes. An example, taken from von der Hagen's edition, is the following stanza:

Es sass in Ungerlande a
ein konick so wol bekant, b
der was Etzel benande; a
sein gleichen man nyndert fand: b
an reichtum und an milde c
was im kein konick gleich; d
zwelt konicklich kron und schilde c
dinten dem konick reich. d

The same stanza written as "Langzeilen", with "|" representing the caesura:

Es sass in Ungerlande a || ein konick so wol bekant, b
der was Etzel benande; a || sein gleichen man nyndert fand: b
an reichtum und an milde c || was im kein konick gleich; d
zwelt konicklich kron und schilde c || dinten dem konick reich. d

== Relation to the Oral Tradition ==
The poem deviates from the Dietrich's biography found in other poems: he should not be present at Etzel's court until he is a man.

The text is interesting in its relation to Dietrich's death: according to some traditions, Dietrich became the leader of the Wild Hunt and chased nymphs through the forests. Church tradition, coming from the Dialogues of Gregory the Great, also made the claim that Theoderic's soul had been seen dropped into Mount Etna for his sins. Instead of Dietrich as the Wild Huntsman, the Wunderer is placed in this role, and Dietrich defends the lady he is attacking. Additionally, the narrator mentions that Dietrich is still alive today: because of some fault he is carried off by the devil in the form of a horse to Rumeney (Romagna?) to fight dragons until the end of days. The poem could thus be understood as a refutation of the idea of Dietrich as either damned or a hunter of women. Enemies of Dietrich who hunt women with hounds are also found in the Eckenlied and Virginal. The Wunderer is different from these other figures, however, and more similar to stories transmitted in Boccaccio's Decamaron, in that the Wunderer is motivated to hunt the woman in question because she refuses to love him. Gillespie nevertheless notes that Etzel's attempts to appease the Wunderer by offering him food resembles how peasants sought to appease the leader of the Wild Hunt.

19th century scholarship attempted to connect Frau Saelde of the poem with "Saligen" or "Salgfrauen", female figures of Tyrolean folk stories who are chased by the Wild Huntsman. Joachim Heinzle views this as unprovable, and would rather see Frau Saelde as a reflex of the personification Fortuna, i.e. a literary rather than a folk element of the poem. Gillespie suggests her name may derive from the prophecy of Babehilt that Dietrich will have good fortune, found in one version of the Eckenlied. Recent scholarship has suggested that Frau Saelde's three magical abilities found in the poem may derive from influence from Slavic folklore, something also often speculated upon for another text of German heroic poetry, Ortnit.

== Reception ==
The Wunderer was adapted into a Nuremberg carnival play, possibly by Hans Folz (1435-1516). It follows the stanzaic version of the poem closely, yet also has correspondences to the version in rhyming couplets.

== Editions and Facsimiles ==
- Kragl, Florian, ed. (2015). Der Wunderer. Berlin and Boston: de Gruyter. ISBN 9783110400151.
- Zink, Georges, ed. (1949). Le Wunderer. Fac-similé de l'édition de 1503. Paris: Aubier.
- von der Hagen, Friedrich Heinrich; Primisser, Anton, eds. (1825). "Etzels Hofhaltung". Der Helden Buch in der Ursprache herausgegeben. Vol. 2. Berlin: Reimer. pp. 55–73.
- Keller, Adelbert von, ed. (1855). "Ain spruch von aim konig mit namen Ezzel". Erzählungen aus altdeutschen Handschriften. Stuttgart: Laup. pp. 1–9.
