= Heldenbuch =

Group of 15th and 16th-century German manuscripts and prints

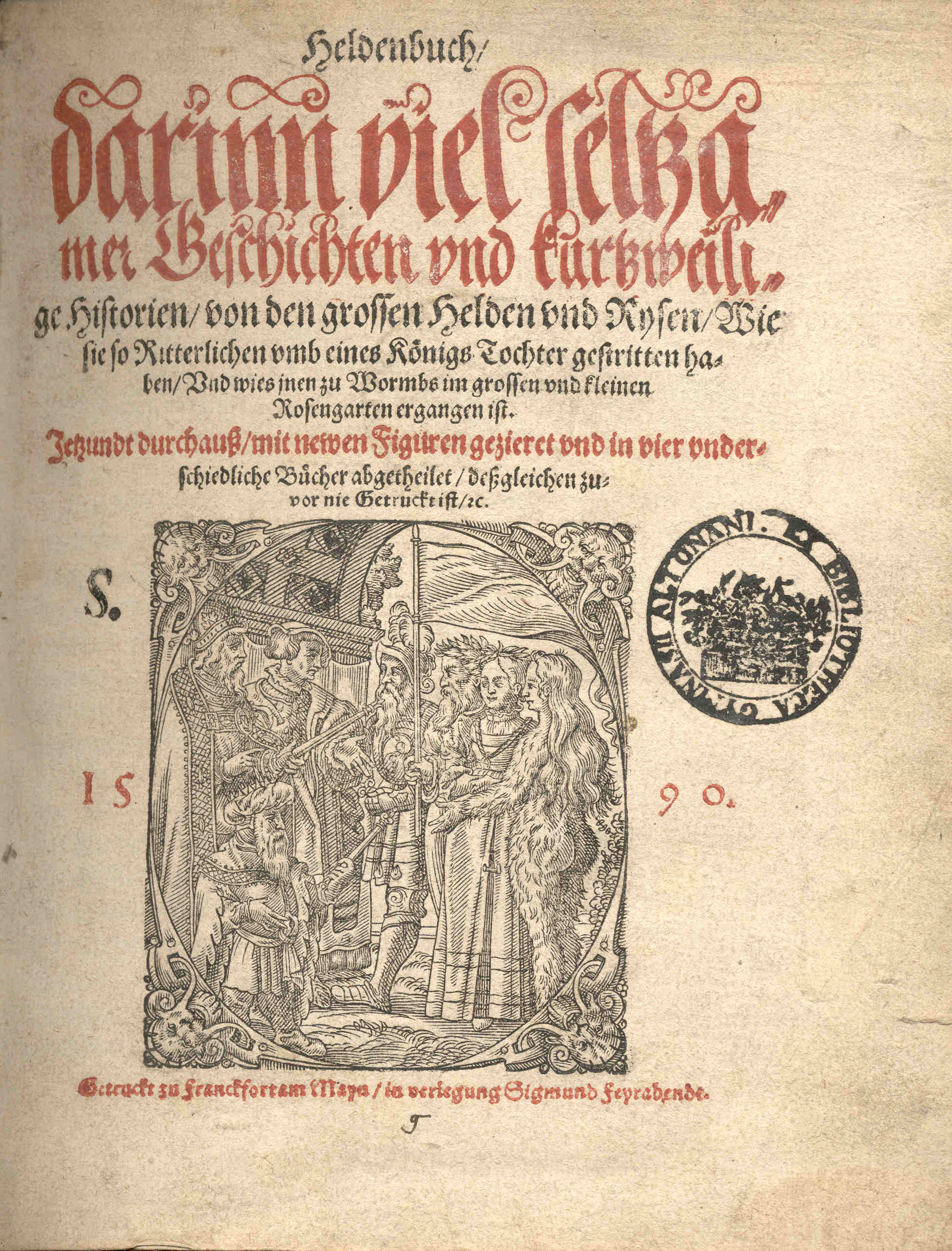
Title page of the 1590 edition of the Heldenbuch.

Heldenbücher (singular Heldenbuch "book of heroes") is the conventional title under which a group of German manuscripts and prints of the 15th and 16th centuries has come down to us. Each Heldenbuch contains a collection of primarily epic poetry, typically including material from the Theodoric cycle, and the cycle of Hugdietrich, Wolfdietrich and Ortnit. The Heldenbuch texts are thus based on medieval German literature, but adapted to the tastes of the Renaissance.

== Manuscripts ==
The earliest surviving Heldenbuch is a parchment manuscript dating from the first half of the 14th century, which survived only in five fragments (two are now missing). It is variously referred to as the Rheinfränkisches Heldenbuch ("Rhine Franconian Heldenbuch") from its dialect or the Berlin-Wolfenbüttel Heldenbuch from the location of two of the fragments, and preserves parts of the Eckenlied (E_{3}), Virginal (V_{3}), Ortnit (C) and Wolfdietrich (C), though the fragments do not give any indication of the original order. The large format and luxurious quality of the manuscript indicate the status of the heroic epic in the 14th century.

After this, four complete Heldenbuch manuscripts are known:

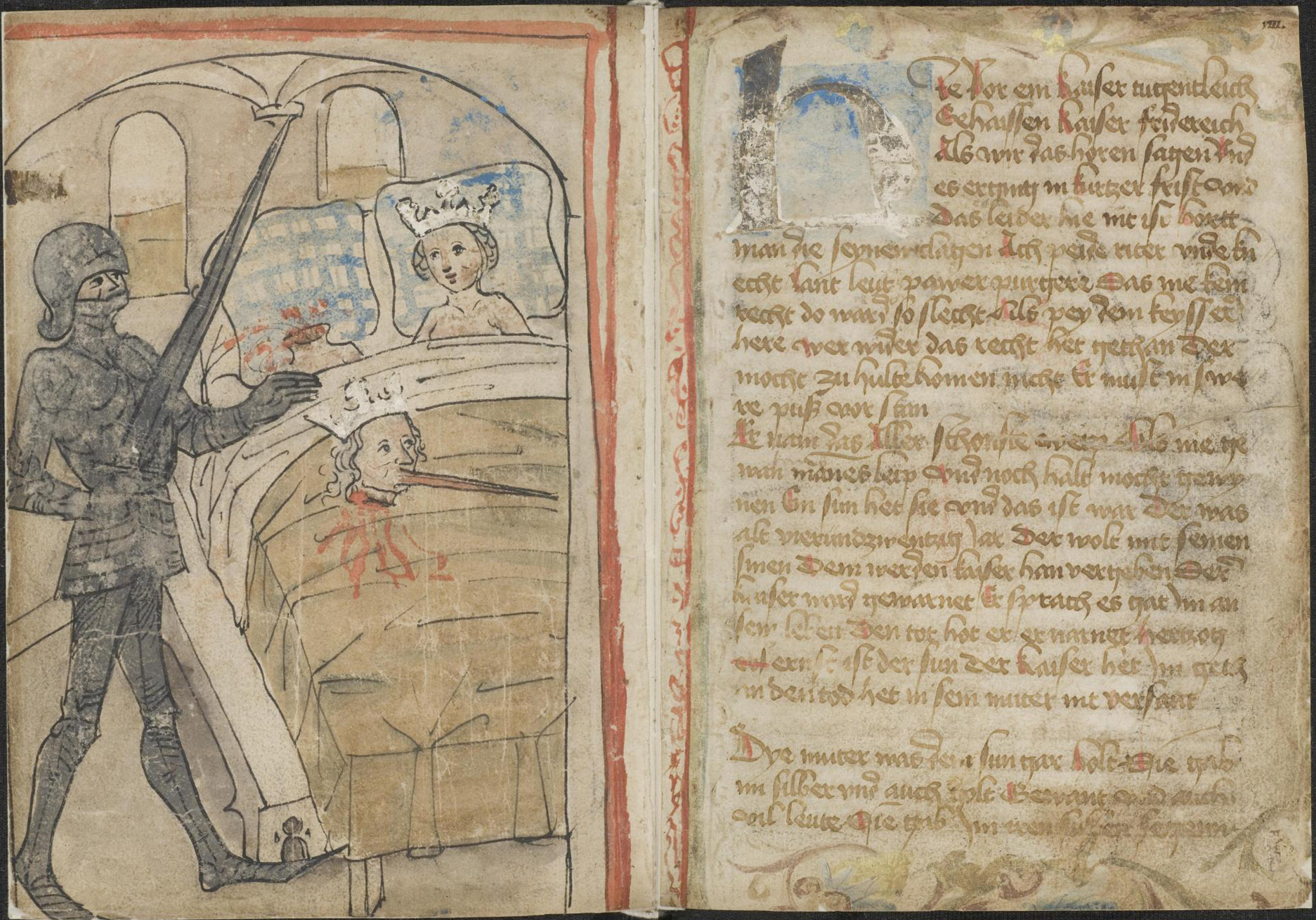
The Dresden Heldenbuch, folios 264v & 265r: the first pages of "Herzog Ernst"

- The Dresden Heldenbuch of Kaspar von der Rhön (Saxon State and University Library Dresden, Mscr.Dresd.M.201) dates from 1472. Written in an East Franconian dialect, probably in Nuremberg, it was compiled by Kaspar and written by him and another unnamed scribe, it includes Ortnit (k), Wolfdietrich (k), Eckenlied (E_{3}), Rosengarten zu Worms, Meerwunder, Sigenot, Der Wunderer, Herzog Ernst, Laurin, Virginal (V_{11}) and the Jüngeres Hildebrandslied. It therefore includes all the "fantastic" Dietrich epics apart from Goldemar. Each poem is preceded by a full-page illustration. Many of the poems have been deliberately shortened, sometime drastically, by the scribes in order to make them short enough to be read in a single sitting, as they explicitly remark. The manuscript, previously in private hands, was purchased by the Electoral Library of Saxony (precursor of the current State Library), in 1793. Already showing considerable damage by the start of the 20th century, during the Second World War, the manuscript was stored in a bomb-proof vault, but it suffered extensive water damage in the aftermath of the allied bombing in February 1945. This severely damaged the illustrations and made some pages impossible to read. However, four transcriptions made in the 18th and 19th centuries provide assistance with reading the text.
- The Johanniter-Heldenbuch dates from 1476. It was lost in the bombardment of the municipal library (located in the Temple Neuf) by German artillery during the August 1870 Siege of Strassburg, but the contents are known from earlier transcriptions. It contained Wolfdietrich (D), Rosengarten zu Worms, Salman und Morolf and Ortnit (D). It was first recorded in Johann Jakob Witter's 1746 catalogue of the library of the Order of St John (German Johanniter) in Strasbourg, by which time the codex had been unbound and reassembled, putting the texts in a different order from other Heldenbücher.
- The Strassburg Heldenbuch of Diebolt von Hanowe from around 1480 was also lost in the Siege of Strassburg — it, too, was stored in the Temple Neuf — and is likewise known only from transcriptions. It contained Ortnit (D), Wolfdietrich (D), Rosengarten zu Worms, Laurin, Sigenot, der Stricker's Pfaffe Amis, Salomon und Markolf and Die undankbare Wiedererweckte. The manuscript text is based on a lost Heldenbuch manuscript which also served as the source for the earliest printed Heldenbuch of 1479. In addition to the poems, both the codex and printed book contain a prose essay, now called the Heldenbuch-Prosa ("Heldenbuch Prose"), which provides a "history" of all the heroes in the Nibelungenlied and Dietrich cycles. In the manuscript it forms the introduction, in the print version, an appendix.
- Lienhart Scheubels Heldenbuch, (Austrian National Library, Cod. 15478), named after its first owner, was written in an Austro-Bavarian dialect. It was compiled in sections, which may initially have circulated separately, with the earliest parts written around 1480 and the last around 1490. It contains Virginal (V_{12}), Antelan, Ortnit (D), Wolfdietrich (D), the Nibelungenlied and Lorengel. It was discovered in 1856 by Julius Feifalik in the Piarist College of St Joseph in Vienna, and for this reason it is also sometimes referred to as the Wiener Piaristenhandschrift.

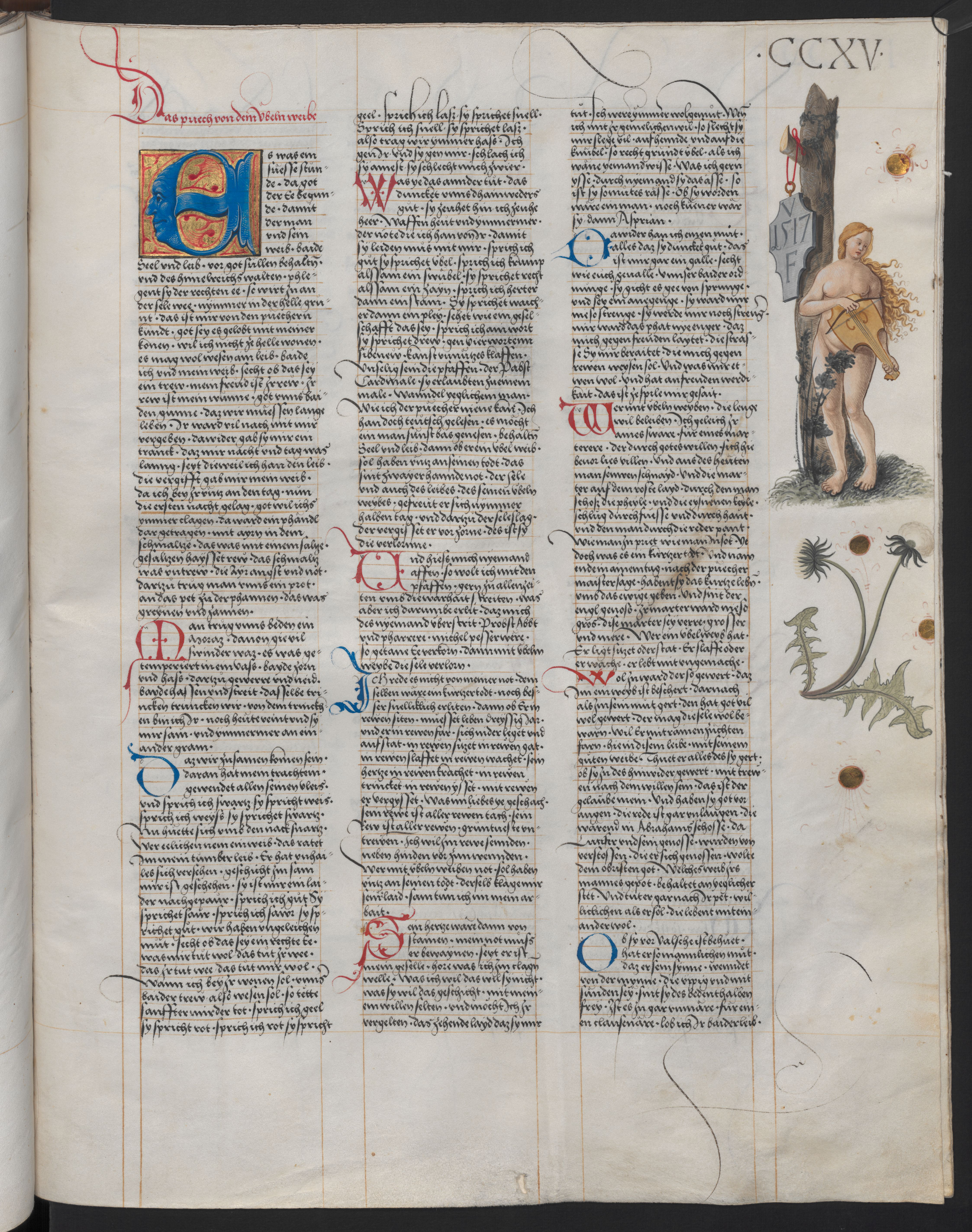
The Ambraser Heldenbuch, folio 215^{r}. The initials VF on the shield are assumed to be those of the artist.

The Ambraser Heldenbuch, in spite of the name, is not a Heldenbuch in the same sense as these manuscripts, since only one third of its contents belong to the genre of heroic verse — the remainder are courtly and didactic works from the 13th century. However, the table of contents at the front of the codex has the heading "Tabula des Heldenpuechs". Within the heroic genre, it goes beyond the others in offering the complete Nibelungen cycle: the Nibelungenlied, the Nibelungenklage and Kudrun. From the Dietrich cycle it includes Dietrichs Flucht, Rabenschlacht, Biterolf und Dietleib, Ortnit (A) and Wolfdietrich (A). The manuscript was commissioned sometime before 1504 by the Emperor Maximilian I and completed in 1517. It is a luxurious codex — almost 500 large-format pages with three columns of text, decorated with Lombardic capitals and many marginal illustrations — and it provides evidence of the continuing interest of this material to an aristocratic readership into the 16th century.

Two fragments of a 15th century manuscript of Virginal (V_{7}) in the monastery library at Ebstorf in Lower Saxony and the Hessen State Archives in Marburg, together with a fragment of Rosengarten (R_{8}) in the Royal Library in Copenhagen, may represent the remains of another Heldenbuch. The language is Bavarian, and the manuscript probably of Austrian origin. William II, Landgrave of Hesse has been suggested as a possible owner. The manuscript was cut up by 1564 at the latest.

A potential further Heldenbuch is the Heldenbuch an der Etsch ("Heldenbuch on the River Adige"). This phrase appears in a 1502 notebook entry by Maximilian I and has long been taken to refer to a lost source of the heroic poems in the Ambraser Heldenbuch. However, there are uncertainties over the interpretation of Maximilian's words and no firm conclusion can be reached on the existence of this supposed codex.

== Prints ==
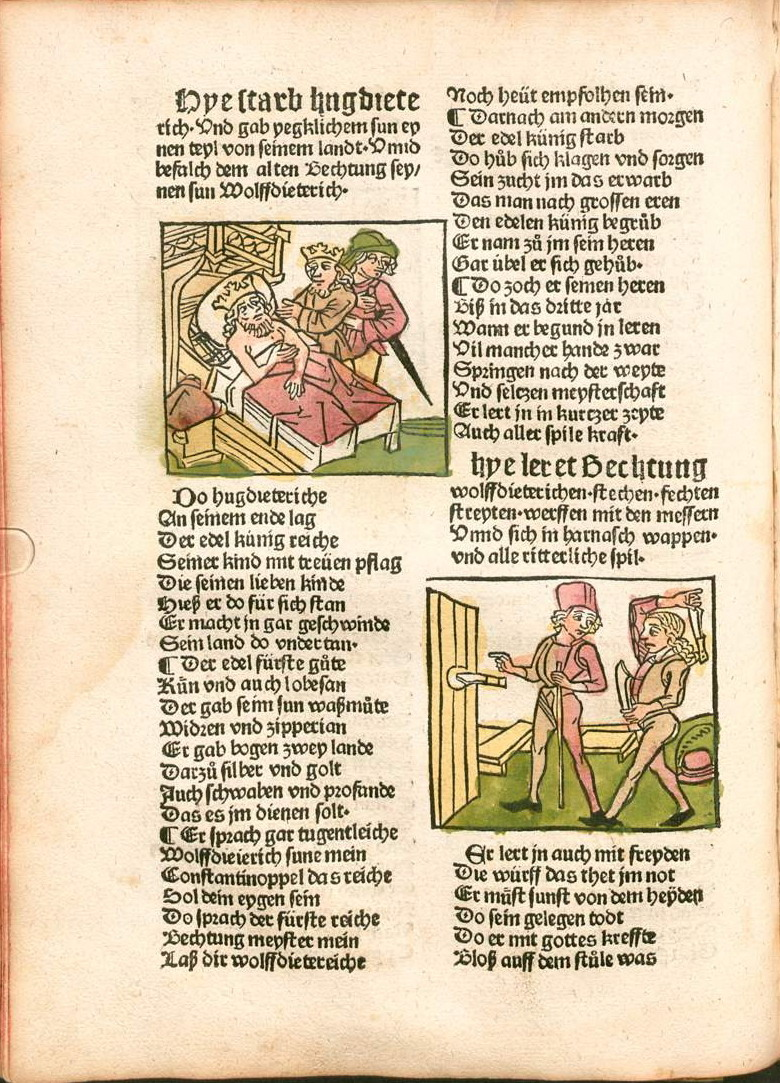
The Augsburg edition of the Strassburg Heldenbuch, printed by Johann Schönsperger, Augsburg 1491. Folio 49v.

The first printed Heldenbuch dates to 1479, bearing the title der helden buch/das nennet den wolfdieterich, putting its main focus on Wolfdietrich, whom it makes an ancestor of Dietrich's. Later printed Heldenbücher appeared in Augsburg 1491, Hagenau 1509, Augsburg 1545, Frankfurt 1560 and Frankfurt 1590.

== The "Heldenbuch-Prosa" ==
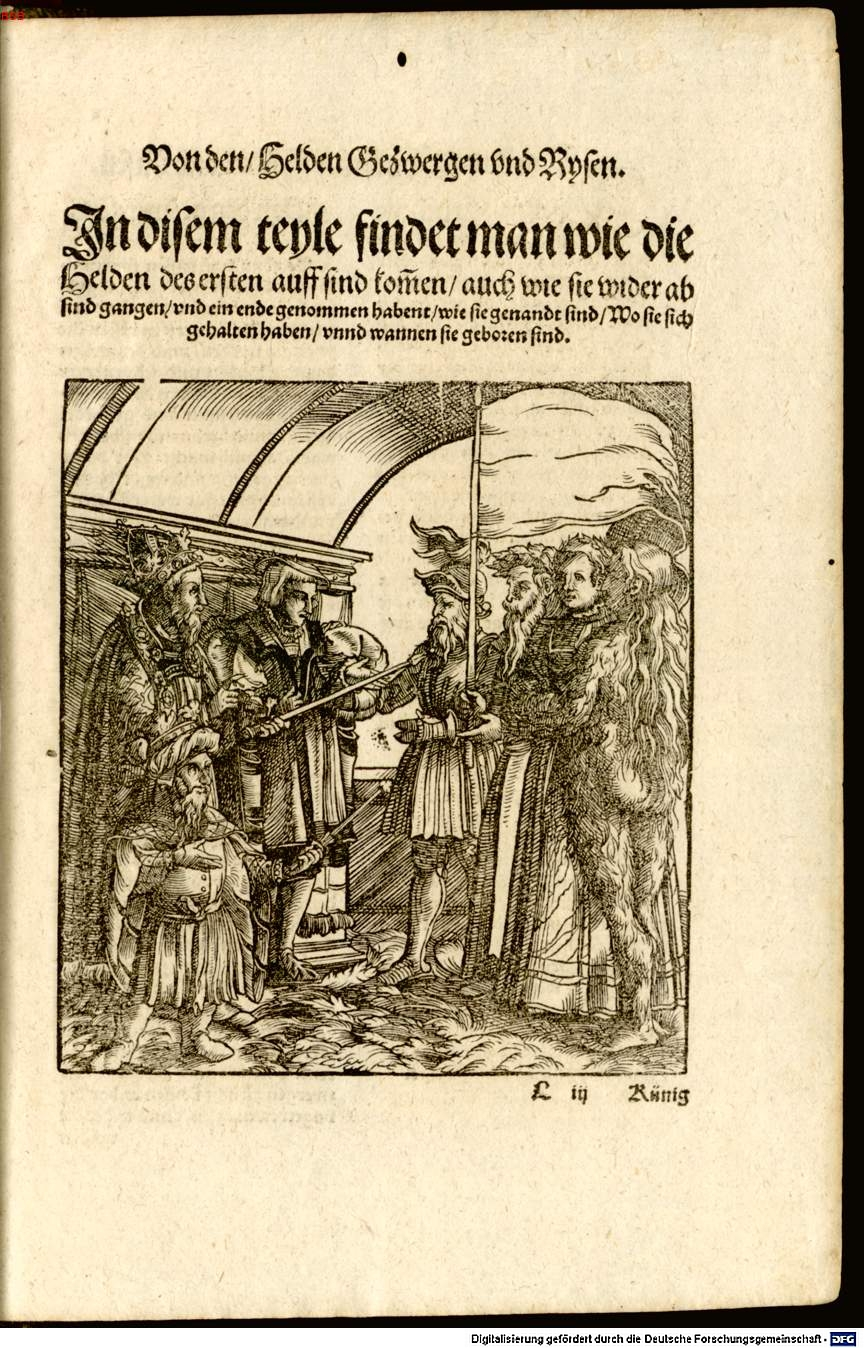
The title page of the "Heldenbuch-Prosa" in the 1545 edition, printed in Augsburg by Heinrich Steiner.

Along with the poems, the Strassburg Heldenbuch of Diebolt von Hanow included an introductory essay, now called the "Heldenbuch-Prosa" ("Heldenbuch Prose"), which was copied by all the later printed editions, either as a preface or as an afterword. The "Heldenbuch-Prosa" is also transmitted in a printed book of Sigenot, Das Lied vom Hürnen Seyfrid, and Laurin (Lübeck, 1560), and excerpts are printed in a printing of Laurin (Nuremberg, 1555). It presents "a brief survey in prose form of the most important figures and events of German medieval heroic poetry". The Heldenbuch-Prosa offers an all-encompassing depiction of the entire heroic age, partially in the form of a narrative, partially in the form of a catalog of names. It is structured both genealogically and geographically, dividing the heroes into those from around Aachen and Cologne, those from Hunland, and those from Worms. The compiler's use of prose may indicate a claim for the historical veracity of the account.

The piece starts with the "first hero," Orendel von Trier, and his adventures, before listing the most important lands in which the heroes lived.

It then explains the genesis of the heroes: in the beginning, God created the dwarves with the knowledge of minerals; he then created the giants to protect the dwarves from dragons and other monsters, but the giants later became evil, so he created the heroes, brave and strong, to defend the dwarves against both the giants and the dragons. The heroes also honoured and helped women, protecting widows and orphans. None of the heroes were peasants, and all lords and nobles are descended from them.

Now follows a list of famous heroes, briefly characterised, and a long section outlining the stories of Ortnit, Hugdietreich and Wolfdietrich. It then describes the descent from Wolfdietrich of Dietrich von Bern, telling how the spirit of Mohammed came to his mother when she was pregnant and foretold her son's greatness.

Some figures from the Nibelungenlied are introduced as heroes from the Rhineland and Lower Rhine, which links to the next section devoted to the heroes of Hungary (Hunland) centred around King Etzel, and then to a long passage about Dietrich von Bern. According to the text, Dietrich is the grandson of Wolfdietrich and son of Dietmar. During her pregnancy, Dietrich's mother was visited by the demon Machmet (i.e. Mohammed imagined as a Muslim god), who prophesies that Dietrich will be the strongest spirit who ever lived and will breathe fire when angry. The devil (Machmet?) then builds Verona/Bern in three days. Ermenrich, here imagined as Dietrich's brother rather than his uncle, rapes his marshal Sibiche's wife, whereupon Sibiche decides to advise Ermenrich in such a way as to ensure his lord's destruction. Thus he advises Ermenrich to hang his own nephews, the Harlungen. Their guardian, Eckehart of Breisach, informs Dietrich, and Dietrich declares war on Ermenrich. Ermenrich, however, captures Dietrich's best men, and to ransom them, Dietrich goes into exile. He ends up at Etzel's court, who gives Dietrich a large army that reconquers Verona. However, once Dietrich had fought at the rose garden against Siegfried, slaying him.

The piece closes with the demise of the heroes, beginning with the marriage of Etzel and Kriemhilt: according to Heldenbuch-Prosa, Kriemhilt organized her wedding as revenge for Dietrich having killed Siegfried in a rose garden. This leads to deaths of the Burgundians and many other warriors at Etzel's court, leaving only Dietrich and Hildebrand alive. They are then involved in a battle against Günther at Bern, which only Dietrich survived. Told by a dwarf that "your kingdom is no longer of this world", he disappears for ever. The only remaining hero is Eckehart, who, having visited the Venusberg, will continue to live until the day of judgment and warns others not to go there.

The Heldenbuch-Prosa assembles an enormous amount of material in a somewhat haphazard fashion to explain the world of the heroic poems. Some of the material in the "Heldenbuch-Prosa" is not to be found in the narratives in the book or in other surviving material; some has parallels in the Thidrekssaga, but the compiler cannot have been familiar with that text. This suggests that he was also drawing on oral traditions, as well as perhaps as on his own invention, in order to make coherent sense of the material. Although the Nibelungenlied is not included in the Strassburg Heldenbuch or its printed version (it is found in the Ambraser Heldenbuch and Lienhart Scheubel's Heldenbuch), the "Heldenbuch-Prosa" provides evidence of the persistence of an oral tradition in existence alongside a well-known written text.

== Reception ==
The modern reception of the Heldenbücher starts in the 18th century. The Dresden Heldenbuch is first mentioned by Heinrich Goltlieb Titz and Johann David Köhler in 1714, and the manuscript was later owned by Johann Christoph Gottsched. Diebolt von Hanowe's Strassburg Heldenbuch is discussed in Johann Schilter's Catalogue of German Authors in 1728.

Although the above shows knowledge of manuscript Heldenbücher among some before 1800, the majority of discussions of the Heldenbuch focused on the printed version with Ornit, Wolfdietrich, Laurin, and the Rosengarten zu Worms before this point. The printed Heldenbuch continued to dominate discussions into the early nineteenth century. In 1796, Friedrich von Adelung published "Sieben Stücke aus dem Heldenbuch" ("Seven pieces from the Heldenbuch") in his Nachrichten von altdeutschen Gedichten, welche aus der heidelbergischen Bibliothek in die vatikanische gekommen sind. This publication was responsible for increased attention paid to manuscript Heldenbücher rather than the printed version. Ludwig Tieck examined original manuscripts and prints, in 1793 transcribing a Heldenbuch of 1577. In 1807 he announced his own Heldenbuch edition, though it never came to fruition. In 1811 Friedrich Heinrich von der Hagen, with whom Tieck at one point had planned to collaborate, published Der Helden Buch, with six works translated into Modern German, followed in 1820 and 1825 by the two-volume Der Helden Buch in der Ursprache herausgegeben ("The Heldenbuch published in the original language"), which includes the entire text of the Dresdener Heldenbuch. Von der Hagen attempted to expand the boundaries of the Heldenbuch to include all German heroic poetry besides the Nibelungenlied in his various editions. By the middle of the eighteenth century, most scholars limited the term to include the texts of the printed Heldenbuch and all the various poems in the cycle of Dietrich von Bern. This meaning of the term was then used by the editors of the Deutsches Heldenbuch (5 vols. 1866–1873).

Though the Heldenbuch's influence on modern poetry is limited, Johann Wolfgang von Goethe was familiar with it, having created a dramatic farce known as "The Romantic Poetry" in 1809, which featured various characters from the Heldenbuch, such as Ornit. The text features rewritings of passages of that poem as well, yet changes the ending so that Ornit defeats the dragons. Von der Hagen dedicated his 1811 edition to Goethe and sent him an example, which was well received. The story "The New Melusine" contained within Wilhelm Meister's Apprenticeship is clearly inspired by the Heldenbuch-Prosa. The nineteenth century also saw the poems of the Heldenbuch begin to play a role in poetological discourse: August Wilhelm Schlegel described these poems as a "heroic comedy" (Heldenkomödie) that could co-existed beside the "great tragedy" of the Nibelungenlied during a series of lectures held in 1802/03. In his Aesthetics, however, Friedrich Hegel described both the Heldenbuch and the Nibelungenlied as an example of the qualities an epic ought not to have.

== Editions ==
In addition to editions of the individual works included in the Heldenbücher — see the relevant articles — there are a few editions of an entire Heldenbuch or of selections from the Heldenbücher:

- von der Hagen, Friedrich Heinrich, ed. (1811). Der Helden Buch. Berlin: Unger.
- von der Hagen, Friedrich Heinrich; Primisser, Anton, eds. (1820–1825). Der Helden Buch in der Ursprache herausgegeben. Vol. 1–2. Berlin: Reimer.
- von der Hagen, Friedrich Heinrich, ed. (1855). Heldenbuch: altdeutsche Heldenlieder aus dem Sagenkreise Dietrichs von Bern und der Nibelungen. Leipzig: Hermann Schultze.
- Heinzle, Joachim, ed. (1981–1987). Heldenbuch: nach dem ältesten Druck in Abbildung herausgegeben. Göppingen: Kümmerle. (Facsimile edition of the first printed Heldenbuch (volume 1), together with commentary (volume 2))
- von Keller, Adelbert, ed. (1867). Das deutsche Heldenbuch Nach dem mutmasslich ältesten Drucke. Stuttgart: Literarischer Verein in Stuttgart. Reprint. Hildesheim: Georg Olms. 1966. ISBN 978-3487512983. (The Strassburg Heldenbuch of 1479)
- Deutsches Heldenbuch, Berlin: Weidmann, 1866–1873, various editors (Reprint Weidmann, 2004 ISBN 3-615-17100-4).:
  1. Biterolf und Dietleib, Laurin und Walberan, 1866
  2. Alpharts Tod; Dietrichs Flucht, Rabenschlacht, 1866
  3. Ornit und die Wolfdietriche, Vol. 1, 1871 (Ortnit/Wolfdietrich A, Wolfdietrich B)
  4. Ornit und die Wolfdietriche, Vol. 2, 1873 (Ortnit/Wolfdietrich C, Wolfdietrich D)
  5. Dietrichs Abenteuer, 1870
- Kofler, Walter, ed. (1999). Das Strassburger Heldenbuch: Rekonstruktion der Textfassung des Diebolt von Hanowe. Göppingen: Kümmerle. ISBN 978-3874529136.
- Kofler, Walter, ed. (2006). Das Dresdener Heldenbuch und die Bruchstücke des Berlin-Wolfenbütteler Heldenbuchs : Edition und Digitalfaksimile. Stuttgart: Hirzel. ISBN 9783777614359.

The University of Innsbruck has an ongoing transcription project for the Ambraser Heldenbuch.

== Translations ==
- Simrock, Karl (1843–1849). Das Heldenbuch. Vol. 1–6. Stuttgart, Tübingen: Cotta.
- Weber, Henry William; Jamieson, Robert; Scott, Walter (1814). "Das Heldenbuch — The Book of Heroes". Illustrations of Northern Antiquities from the earlier Teutonic and Scandinavian Romances; being an abstract of the Book of Heroes and Nibelungen Lay; with translations from the old German, Danish, Swedish, and Icelandic languages; with notes and dissertations. Edinburgh: Longman, Hurst, Rees, Orme, and Brown.

== See also ==
- Germanic Heroic Age
