= Goldemar =

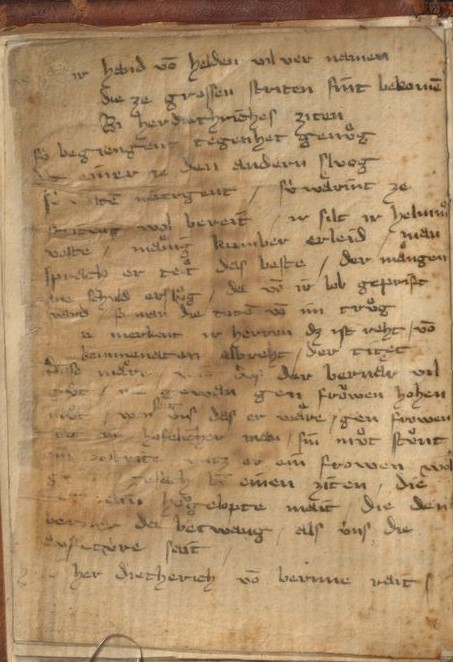
First page of the fragment of Albrecht von Kemenaten's Goldemar. Deutsches Nationalmuseum Ms. 80 fol. 6v.

Goldemar is a fragmentary thirteenth-century Middle High German poem by Albrecht von Kemenaten about the legendary hero Dietrich von Bern, the counterpart of the historical Ostrogothic king Theodoric the Great in Germanic heroic legend. It is one of the so-called fantastical (aventiurehaft) Dietrich poems, so called because it more closely resembles a courtly romance than a heroic epic.

The poem concerns Dietrich's fight with the dwarf king Goldemar after he sees the dwarf absconding with a princess. It is the only poem in the tradition of Germanic heroic poetry with a named author that is accepted as genuine.

== Summary ==
Only the first nine stanzas of the Goldemar have survived. They tell that Dietrich once set off into the forest to defeat the giants who live in Trutmunt forest. While on this quest, he comes across a mountain where dwarfs make their home. He notices that the dwarfs have a girl with them, and immediately falls in love. The dwarfs attempt to hide the girl, and their king, Goldemar, responds when Dietrich asks them about her. The text breaks off in the middle of his speech.

From the Heldenbuch-Prosa we know that the girl's name is Herlin, a princess from Portugal. King Goldemar had abducted her after her father was slain by heathens, but the girl had resisted Goldemar's attempts to sleep with her. Dietrich then rescued and married her. From the late medieval romance Reinfrid von Braunschweig we also know that Dietrich had to defeat various giants who were at Goldemar's command. In the process, Dietrich and his companions destroyed the Trutmunt forest and the dwarfs' mountain.

== Manuscript transmission and dating ==
The Goldemar is transmitted in a single paper manuscript dating from the middle of the fourteenth-century (c. 1355-1357). Only eight leaves survive, on which, besides the Goldemar, medical recipes, a Latin-German glossary of the names of herbs, and a second Dietrich poem, the Virginal are found. The manuscript is found today in the Germanisches Nationalmuseum in Nuremberg (Hs. 80).

The poem itself probably dates to sometime around 1230, as this is the time when its author is attested.

== Authorship and metrical form ==
Goldemar is the only German heroic poem with a named author, Albrecht von Kemenaten. Though it is possible that this is an authorial fiction, Albrecht is generally accepted as the genuine author of the poem. His being named, as opposed to the usual practice of anonymous heroic poems, likely marks Albrecht's ambition to write a poem more similar to a courtly romance. He is praised and mentioned as alive in Rudolf von Ems's Alexander (c. 1230), but dead in Rudolf's Willehalm von Orlens (c. 1235/40). The family name "von Kemenaten" is attested both in Tyrol and in Thurgau, meaning the poet may come from either area.

19th century scholars attempted to ascribe the authorship of the Eckenlied, the Virginal, and the Sigenot to Albrecht due to the use of the same stanzaic form (the "Berner Ton") in all, as well as various supposed stylistic similarities, but this theory has been given up. The "Berner Ton" consists of thirteen lines rhyming in the following scheme: aabccbdedefxf. The following stanza from Lienert's edition of Goldemar can serve as a typical example:

Nu merkent, ir herren, daz ist reht: a (four feet)
Von Kemmenaten Albreht, a (four feet)
der tihtet dúse ma^{e}re, b (three feet)
wie das der Berna^{e}r vil gůt c (four feet)
nie gewan gen fro^{v}wen hohen můt. c (four feet)
Wan seitt uns, das er wa^{e}re b (three feet)
gen frowen niht ein hofelicher man d (four feet)
(sin můt stůnt im ze strite) e (three feet)
unz er ein frowen wolgetan d (four feet)
gesach bi einen ziten: e (three feet)
Die was ein ho^{v} gelopte mait, f (four feet)
die den Berner da betwang, x (three feet)
als úns die aufetúre sait. f (three feet)

Helmut de Boor argues that, even if Albrecht was not the author of all four poems in the "Berner Ton", he was clearly the inventor of such a complicated metrical form, an opinion shared by Werner Hoffmann. This would make Albrecht the "inventor" of the fantastical poems about Dietrich. Joachim Heinzle, however, has argued that Albrecht's metrical form actually shows him to be using the form of the "Berner Ton" given above, rather than that found in the earliest attested example, the single Eckenlied stanza transmitted in the Codex Buranus. Heinzle concludes from this fact that Albrecht adapted an already existing form.

== Genre ==
The poem begins with a sharp critique of existing heroic poetry as a glorification of brutality. Albrecht will instead tell a tale of how Dietrich came to fall in love and behave in a courtly manner toward women, something which, the poem notes, he is never said to have done. The poem thus appears to be turning away from the topic of heroic poetry to the subject matter of courtly romance. Joachim Heinzle suggests that Albrecht may have had the Dietrich poem Laurin in mind specifically, as it also concerns Dietrich's battle against a dwarf king and is characterized by extreme violence. Victor Millet argues that Albrecht, in deliberately turning away from traditional tales about Dietrich, shows that the heroic material could now be invented freely rather than told and retold.

== Relation to the oral tradition ==
Notwithstanding Millet's opinion, some aspects of the Goldemar may still be connected to an oral tradition. Goldemar, for instance, shares his name with a spirit said to haunt houses. He is attested in the work of fifteenth-century historian Person Gobelinus as Rex Goldemer. Heinzle sees this connection between this spirit and the figure in the poem as questionable.

== Editions ==
- Lienert, Elisabeth; Pontini, Elisa; Schumacher, Katrin, eds. (2017). Virginal. Goldemar. Vol. 3. Berlin and Boston: de Gruyter. pp. 821–832. ISBN 9783110476781.
- Zupitza, Julius, ed. (1870). "Goldemar". Das Heldenbuch, fünfter Teil: Dietrichs Abenteuer von Albrecht von Kemenaten nebst den Bruchstücken von Dietrich und Wenezlan. Berlin: Weidmann. pp. 203-204.
