= Love service =

Love service is a ritualized form of male love-devotion toward women, especially noble women, that was popularized in the Middle Ages.

== History ==
The practice of love service appeared first in Medieval Europe and was modeled on a combination of feudalistic class distinctions, courtly love tenets, and gendered aspects of the chivalric class code regarding respectful treatment of women.

Love service had certain resemblances with vassalage, especially the concept of obedience. According to Sandra R. Alfonsi the entire concept of love-service was patterned after the vassal’s oath to serve his lord with loyalty, tenacity, and courage. These same virtues were demanded of the male supplicant. Like the liegeman vis-a-vis his sovereign, the male approached his lady with fear and respect, submitted obediently to her and awaited a fief or in this case an honor of reception as did the vassal.

The vocabulary of love service borrowed some terminology from the vocabulary of feudalism indicative of the ties between a man to his lord. Examples are servitium (service), dominus (denoting the feudal Lord, or Lady), homo ligius (addressing the Lord's liegeman or 'my man'), homage (duty toward Lord), and honor (honoring gestures). The men were sometimes referred to as domnei or donnoi, meaning an attitude of chivalrous devotion of a knight to his Lady based in servitude and duty.
