= Jüngeres Hildebrandslied =

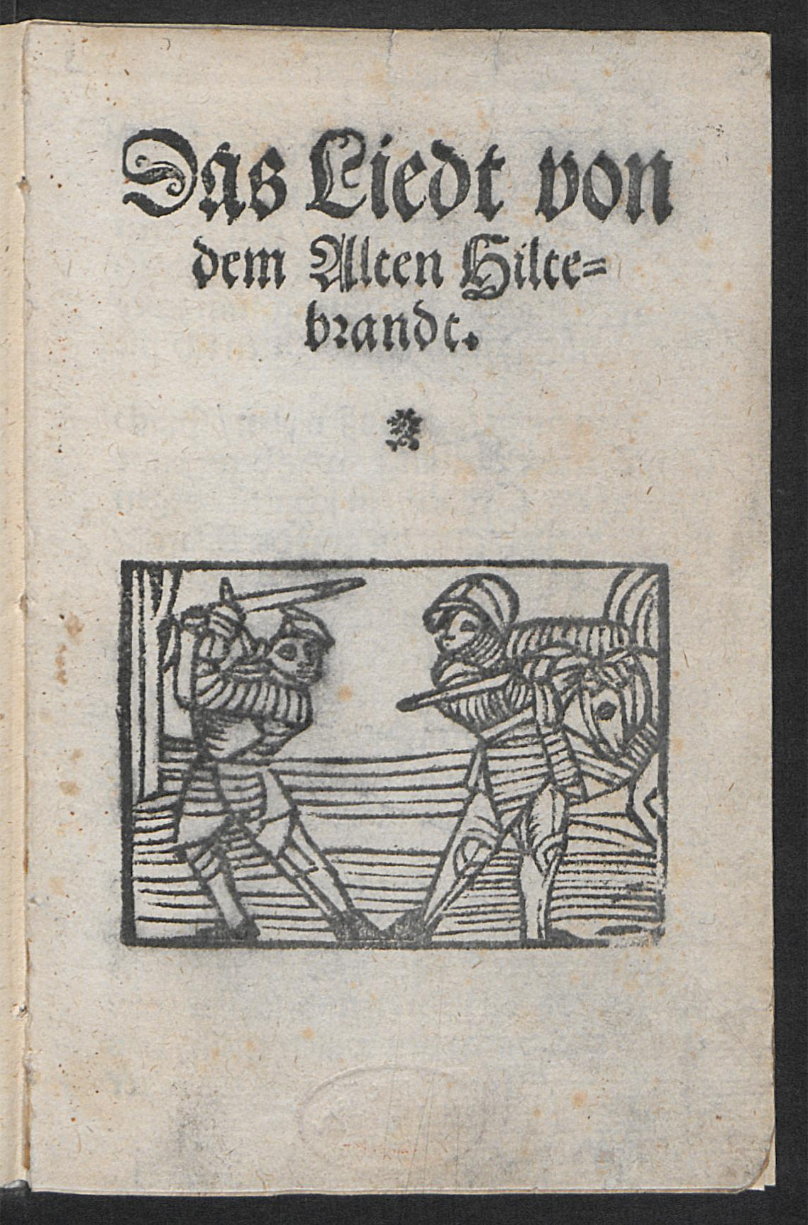
Title page of the Jüngeres Hildebrandslied. Valentin Newber, Nuremberg, 1570. Staatsbibliothek Berlin Yf 8215 R.

The Jüngeres Hildebrandslied (the younger lay of Hildebrand) or Das Lied von dem alten Hildebrand (the song of old Hildebrand) is an anonymous Early New High German heroic ballad, first attested in the fifteenth century. A late attestation of Germanic heroic legend, the ballad features the same basic story as the much older Hildebrandslied, but was composed without knowledge of that text. Rather, it reworks the oral legend of the warrior Hildebrand and his fight against his son (here Alebrand) in accordance with late medieval and early modern taste. It is highly sentimentalized and focuses on Hildebrand's return home rather than the tragic conflict of the older tradition.

The Jüngeres Hildebrandslied was an extremely popular ballad in the age of print, and continued to be reprinted into the eighteenth century. Its melody was well known and the poem has given its name to its metrical form, the so-called "Hildebrandston". The Jüngeres Hildebrandslied was translated into Dutch, Yiddish, and Danish several times. In the nineteenth century it was collected as a traditional piece of German folk poetry by the editors of Des Knaben Wunderhorn. Together with another heroic ballad, Das Lied vom Hürnen Seyfrid, it represents the longest lasting element of the heroic tradition in Germany that remained popular outside of learned circles.

== Summary ==
Hildebrand says that he wants to ride to Bern (Verona), in order to see his wife Ute. A knight warns him that if he goes there he will have to fight against Alebrand, but Hildebrand believes he will defeat Alebrand easily. Dietrich von Bern asks him not to go, because Dietrich greatly values the young Alebrand, but Hildebrand goes anyway. As Hildebrand is riding by the Veronan rose garden, a young warrior appears, insults Hildebrand by calling him old, asks him what he is doing in his father's country, and advises him to turn back. Hildebrand laughs and tells him that he has had to fight and ride his whole life in order to return home. This is why his beard is so white. Alebrand declares that he will rip out Hildebrand's beard; the old warrior should give him his weapons if he wants to live. Hildebrand warns Alebrand that he will defend himself, and both draw their swords. Alebrand is able to strike a blow on Hildebrand, and Hildebrand jumps back in shock. He declares that a woman must have taught Alebrand to fight that way. Alebrand denies this and Hildebrand attacks more vigorously, throwing Alebrand to the ground. He demands that Alebrand identify himself, declaring that if he does not belong to the family of the Wolfings (that is, Hildebrand's family), he will slay him. Alebrand claims not to know this family, but identifies his mother as Ute and his father as Hildebrand. Hildebrand now says that if Alebrand's mother is Ute, then he is his father. He kisses his son, and the two reconcile. Alebrands regrets having given his father wounds. Alebrand now brings Hildebrand home and has him sit at the place of honor at the family table. Ute, however, believes that Hildebrand is Alebrand's prisoner and asks why he has placed him there. Alebrand reveals Hildebrand's identity, and Ute pours him wine and welcomes him.

== Transmission and dating ==
The textual form of the Jüngeres Hildebrandslied is a product of the fifteenth century, though its material is clearly much older (see below). It is transmitted in five manuscripts, beginning with a fragment from 1459, with the first complete version found in the Dresdener Heldenbuch. The poem was printed numerous times beginning in the sixteenth century, and continued to be printed into the eighteenth century. The ballad even ended up in the collection of German folk poetry known as Des Knaben Wunderhorn (1805). The poem and the melody to which it was sung were both extremely well known throughout this period.

== Relationship to the oral tradition and the Old High German Hildebrandslied ==
The author of the Jüngeres Hildebrandslied obviously did not know the text of the 800s Hildebrandslied; the ballad is rather the result of a long oral tradition that was only written down in the fifteenth century. It is generally assumed that in the original form of the story, Hildebrand kills his son, an assumption that a few verses in eddic meter in the Old Norse Ásmundar saga kappabana appear to support. It is possible that a version of the story with a tragic and a happy ending coexisted for a time in thirteenth-century Germany, however the version of Hildebrand's battle with his son found in the Old Norse Thidreksaga (c. 1250), based on Low German sources, already includes the survival of both father and son. The name of Hildebrand's son in the Thidrekssaga matches that found in the Jüngeres Hildebrandslied ("Alebrand"), as opposed to the Old High German form "Hadubrand". In the Norse text as in the Younger Lay, moreover, Hildebrand accuses his son of having been taught to fight by a woman after receiving a powerful blow with a sword—these aspects of presumably oral story-telling were thus relatively stable over time.

== Metrical form ==
The Jüngeres Hildebrandslied is composed in a stanza form known as the "Hildebrandston," so named because the Jüngeres Hildebrandslied was the most famous poem to use this metrical form throughout the early modern period, where songs were often marked "im Thon: Wie man den alten Hildenbrandt singt" (in the melody that one uses to sing the old Hildebrand). The stanza consists of four "Langzeilen," lines consisting of three metrical feet, a caesura, and three additional metrical feet. Unlike the similar stanza used in the Nibelungenlied, in the "Hildebrandston" all four lines are of the same length. An example is the following stanza (taken from John Meier's edition):

"Ich wil zu Land ausreiten", || sprach sich Meister Hiltebrant, a
"Der mir die Weg tet weisen || gen Bern wol in die Land, a
Die seind mir unkund gewesen || vil manchen lieben Tag: b
In zwei und dreißig jaren || Fraw Utten ich nie gesach." b

Some versions of the Jüngeres Hildebrandslied use a modified version of the "Hildebrandston" known as the "Heunenweise" or "Hunnenweise" (the Hunnish melody), in which there are always rhymes (or near rhymes) at the mid-line caesura. The stanza can then be reinterpreted as consisting of eight short lines with alternating rhyme rather than four "Langzeilen." An example of this form is the version of the Jüngeres Hildebrandslied that found its way into Des Knaben Wunderhorn:

"Ich will zu Land ausreiten," a
Sprach Meister Hildebrandt, b
"Wer wird die Weg mir weisen a
"Gen Bern wohl in das Land? b
"Unkund sind sie geworden c
Mir manchen lieben Tag, d
In zwey und dreyßig Jahren c
Frau Utten ich nicht sah." d

== Editions ==
- Meier, John, ed. (1935). "Jüngeres Hildebrandslied". Das deutsche Volkslied. Balladen. Vol. 1. Berlin and Leipzig: Reclam. pp. 1–21.
- Achim, Arnim von; Brentano, Clemens, eds. (1805). "Vom alten Hildebrandt". Des Knaben Wunderhorn: alte deutsche Lieder. Archived from the original on September 19, 2015.
