= Moss people =

Small humanoid wood sprites from German folklore

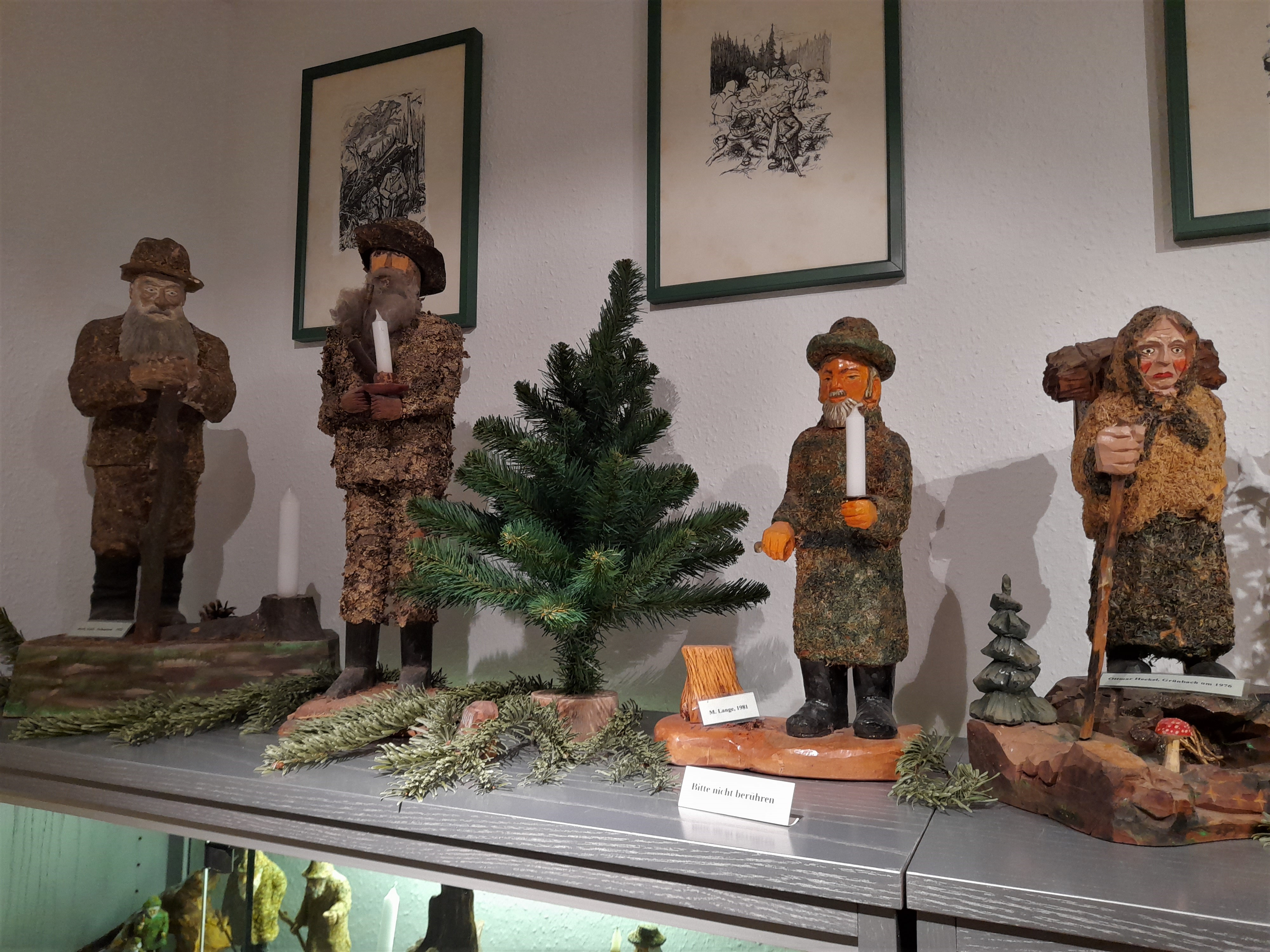
Moss people, both male Moosmännlein ("moss men") and female Moosweiblein ("moss women"), as depicted in traditional German wood art from the Vogtland.

The moss people or moss folk (German: Moosleute, "moss folk", German: [ˈmoːsˌlɔɪ̯tə], wilde Leute, "wild folk", German: [ˈvɪldə ˈlɔɪ̯tə]), also referred to as the wood people or wood folk (Holzleute, "wood folk", German: [ˈhɔltsˌlɔɪ̯tə]) or forest folk (Waldleute, "forest-folk", German: [ˈvaltˌlɔɪ̯tə]), are a class of fairy-folk, variously compared to dwarfs, elves, or spirits, described in German folklore as having an intimate connection to trees and the forest. In German, the words Schrat and Waldschrat are also used for a moss person. (Compare Old Norse skratti, "goblin".) The diminutive Schrätlein also serves as synonym for a nightmare creature.

== Origins ==
Jacob Grimm believed that Gothic skōhsl, used to translate Koine Greek δαιμόνιον (daimonion), "daemon", in the New Testament, was related to Old Norse skōgr and Old English sceaga, both meaning "forest", and therefore represented a cognate of the moss people in Gothic folklore. Subsequent authors, however, have related skōhsl with English "shuck" (from Old English scucca, "evil spirit") and German Scheusal, "monster" (from Middle High German schūsel, though by folk etymology identified with scheuen, "to dread", and -sal, a noun suffix).

Parallels have been drawn between the moss people and woodwoses. Early descriptions of Germanic beliefs include descriptions of "wood people" by the 6th century Roman historian Jordanes and "woodland women" by the 11th-century Rhenish bishop Burchard of Worms. Furthermore, Grimm recorded the terms wildiu wīp, wildero wībo, wilder wībe, wilden wībe, wildaz wīp (all meaning "wild wife") and wilde fröuwelīn ("wild maiden") from various early medieval texts.

== Appearance ==
The moss people are sometimes described as similar to dwarfs, being the same size as children, but "grey and old-looking, hairy, and clad in moss." Sometimes, moss folk are also bigger. In other descriptions they are said to be pretty.

In Saxony, the Holzweibchen ("little wood woman"), also called Buschweibchen ("little shrub woman"), appears as a small shrivelled old woman with a wrinkly face, carrying wood in a basket on its back or brushwood in its apron, walking around propped on a stick or cane, or sitting in a shrub spinning or knitting at crossroads. The wrinkly male occasionally seen carries wood on its back.

In Thuringia, the Holzmännel ("little wood man") which is rarely seen and often downright unknown wears green clothes with red lapels and a triangular black little hat which is both broad and low.

In Upper Palatinate, the Holzfräulein (sg., pl.; "little wood women"), often identified as arme Seelen ("poos souls", i.e. souls in purgatory), are described are described as small, rarely taller than three (Bavarian) foot, dressed in clothes spun from moss (like the tree moss also spun by them), and their faces covered with moss, occasionally wearing wooden shoes, and small enough to sit on tree stumps or ovens or in the space between oven and wall.

== Characteristics ==
They are similar to hamadryads. Their lives are "attached to the trees; if any one causes by friction the inner bark to loosen a Wood-woman dies."

There are further connections to nature when e.g. the mountains are "smoking" with fog due to the Holzweibel (sg., pl.; "little wood women") baking cake which they might also gift to humans asking for it. Contrarily, the male can be rather malicious. If woodsmen want to help it carry its heavy load of wood, it guffaws, leaving the woodsmen stuck deep in the swamp and destroying their axes and saws.

In silent noon and midnight hours, the Holzweibel (sg.,pl.; "little wood women") occasionally sing very lovely but the lyrics are unintelligible.

In the morning, they wash their faces with the dew found in Alchemilla leaves, draw their body through the dewy grass, and dry themselves with either hair moss or rags gifted to them by humans.

Their grain is said to be a plant called Holzgerste ("wood barley") or Teufelsgerste ("devil's barley").

According to Thuringian belief, wood people and moss people are different creatures. While the Holzleute are dressed, the Moosleute are shaggy and fuzzy. Both are the wild huntsman's prey, though. For further information on their plight, see below.

== Dwellings and society ==
According to the Brothers Grimm, the Moosleute or moss people are little men and little women clad in green moss round and round who are found in the heath or in the woods at dark places, also in subterranean holes, dwelling and lying on green moss.

In Upper Palatinate, the Holzleute or wood people dwell in hollow trees if married or divided by gender during youth. In the latter case the dwelling is a little bed of moss beneath a supporting beam. Married pairs are capable of getting children.

According to Jacob Grimm:

"Between Leidhecken and Dauernheim in the Wetterau stands the high mountain, and on it a stone, der welle fra gestoil (the wild woman's chair); there is an impression on the rock, as of the limbs of human sitters. The people say the wild folk lived there 'wei di schtan noch mell warn,' while the stones were still soft; afterwards, being persecuted, the man ran away, the wife and child remained in custody at Dauernheim until they died."

The female Moss people, the Moosfräulein ("Moss ladies"), have a queen called the Buschgroßmutter (Buschgrossmutter; "Shrub Grandmother"). Ludwig Bechstein describes her in his folktale 551:

"According to certain tales of the peasantry, a demonic creature dwells near Leutenberg and on the left bank of river Saale, called the Buschgroßmutter ("Shrub Grandmother"). She has many daughters, called Moosfräuleins ("Moss ladies"), with whom she roves around the country at certain times and upon certain holy nights. It is not good to meet her, for she has wild, staring eyes and crazy, unkempt hair. Often she drives around in a little cart or waggon, and at such times it is wise to stay out of her way. Children, in particular, are afraid of this Putzmommel (hooded, female bogey) and delight in whispering tales of her to frighten each other. She is essentially the same spirit as Hulda or Bertha, the Wild Huntress – to whom local tales ascribe a following of children under the guise of the Heimchen who constitute her attendants in the area she frequents." (Translated from the German text)

== Interactions with humans ==
According to legend, these fairies would occasionally borrow items from people or ask for help but would always compensate the owners generously, often with either good advice or bread. It was, however, easy to anger such wood-sprites, either by spurning their gifts (which might be the compensations named above) or by giving them caraway bread – of which they had a particular hatred, often being heard to utter the doggerel rhyme "Kümmelbrot, unser Tod!" ("Caraway bread, our death!").

The Holzfräulein are given bread, bread crumbs, bread crusts, dumplings, pancakes, potato, grain, dried pears but never meat. They also show their gratitude by becoming domestic spirits and working at night in kitchen, stable, farmyard, and parlor.

In certain myths, the moss folk would ask humans for breast milk to feed their young, or steal little human children – motifs found in changeling lore.

Moss people, especially the females of the species, are able to send plagues on one hand; on the other, they can also heal the victims of such plagues. During epidemics the Holzfräulein ("Wood ladies") would emerge from the forest to show the people which medicinal herbs could cure or ward off plague.

== Relation with the Wild Hunt ==
They were often but not always the object of the Wild Hunt. According to folklore, in order to escape the hunt they enter the trees that woodsmen have marked with a cross that will be chopped down. Des Knaben Wunderhorn records "folk-songs [that] make the huntsman in the wood start a dark-brown maid, and hail her: 'whither away, wild beast?', but his mother did not take to the bride."

The Brothers Grimm tell with regards to the Giant Mountains in Silesia that the lokal wild huntsman, known as Nachtjäger ("night hunter"), chases the so-called Rüttelweiber ("shaking women"), which are thought of as little women clad in moss. Their only chance at rest is the trunk of a felled tree to which the woodsman did say "Gott wael's!" ("God may prevail!" in Silesian dialect). Should he have said "Waels Gott!" when putting the axe to the tree, though, putting God at the end, then such a trunk offers no rest to a Rüttelweibchen ("little shaking woman") who has to constantly flee the Nachtjäger.

In Thuringia, the only place where a Moosweibchen "little moss woman") is safe from the wild huntsman (German wilder Jäger) chasing her kind in the afternoon and at night is a tree stump marked with three crosses by a woodsman while the tree was still falling.

In Upper Palatinate, the wild huntsmen chasing, catching, and ripping to shreds the Holzfräulein, Hulzfral, Holzfralerl (all "little wood lady") or Moosweiblein (sg.,pl.; "little moss lady") are even called Holzhetzer ("wood chasers"). Beside tree stumps with three crosses, she will also be safe sitting in a small hut made from the last five or six flax stalks on the harvested field bound together with a knot.

== Given names of Moss people ==
Individual moss people also have their proper names, a hand full of which are known. Usually that is not the case, though, for if called by name or informed about one of their own, the wood sprite has to leave its human company forever. Known names are:

given name	meaning	gender	attested in	details
Anna Birgl	"Anne Bridget"	female	Upper Palatinate	a Holzweiblein ("little wood wife") called home to her children by her husband
's Buschkathel	"th' Shrub-Katie"	female	Bohemia	
Deuto		female	Silesia	either female given name or word of the woodfolk language used to call out to a Holzweibel
Deutoseu		female	Saxony	might be a word rather than a female given name the golden-haired Holzweibchen was called by its sister
Hipelpipel		possibly male	Silesia	a Holzweibel went away after being told that Hipelpipel was dead
Maunzi	"cat"	female	Upper Palatinate	a Holzweibchen
Metusl		possibly female	Bohemia	a Buschmännchen ("little shrub man") went away after being told that Metusl was dead
Plezipal		male	Bohemia	husband of Tschinka Milla
Rusl		male	Bohemia	the very Buschmännchen who went away after being told that Metusl was dead
Staunzi	"crane fly"	female	Upper Palatinate	a Holzweibchen
Staunzn Maunzen, Staunzen Maunzen	"crane fly cat"	female	Upper Palatinate	Holzweiblein dwelling at a farmer's place who was inquired after by Anna Birgl
Tschinka Milla		female	Bohemia	went away when her husband Plezipal called out to her

== See also ==
- Buschgroßmutter
- Fänggen
- Green Man
- Wild Hunt
- Wild man
- Menninkäinen
- Leshy
- Pukwudgie
- Vittra (folklore)
- Feldgeister
- Granny Squannit
- Gnome
