= Buschgroßmutter =

Elderly female wood sprite from German folklore

The Buschgroßmutter ("shrub grandmother", in older orthography also Buschgrossmutter; German: [ˈbʊʃˌɡʁoːsˌmʊtɐ]) is a legendary creature from German folklore, especially found in folktales from the regions Thuringia, Saxony, former German-speaking Silesia and the former German-speaking parts of Bohemia. She is called various regional names such as Pusch-Grohla ("shrub granny" in Silesian German) and Buschmutter ("shrub mother") in Silesia, 's Buschkathel ("th' Shrub-Katie") and Buschweibchen in Bohemia, Buschweiblein and Buschweibel in Silesia again. Buschweibchen, Buschweiblein, and Buschweibel all mean "shrub woman", with Weibchen, Weiblein or Weibel being the diminutive of Weib, "woman".

The Buschgroßmutter is a forest spirit living in the deepest woods which shows herself to humans only once every hundred years. She is as old as the hills, her appearance being small and ducked, wrinkly and ugly. She has staring eyes and is sometimes said to have an iron head, a typical demonic feature. The Buschgroßmutter's hair is long, as white as snow, but messy and full of lice. The Buschweibchen holds a gnarled stick in her hand. Her feet are overgrown by moss and she walks in a wavering manner. She has tied her apron as if she were transporting something in it and also carries a basket on her back. The Buschmutter is ugly, wearing a tatterered dress and having dishevelled hair, holding a crutch.

The Buschweibchen manifests herself in different natural phenomena. When the mountains are "smoking" with fog in spring and autumn, then the Buschweibchen is said to be cooking. Also when a hailstorm comes up in April and the mountains look veiled, then the Buschweibchen climbs over the mountains.

The character of the Buschgroßmutter is ambivalent, fluctuating between benevolent and malevolent behaviour. She asks people to comb or louse her hair. Those who fulfill her request will be rewarded with a neverending clew of yarn, with a spindle covered with a hundred strands of yarn which might vanish through cussing or with either green or yellow leaves which will later become gold if not thrown away. It is but very difficult to clean and tidy the Buschweibchen's hair because her head is as cold as ice, thus leading to a (temporary) freezing of the helper's hands. When she was sneered at, the Buschgroßmutter takes revenge by breathing on the sneerer which will result in illnesses, most commonly rash. Alternatively she will perch herself on the sneerer, also leading to negative effects. When called Buschmutter, this woman of the woods is simply evil, e.g. when she attacks children picking berries to steal their harvest and break their jars used to hold the gathered berries. She also steals the milk of a herdsman's cows by milking them dry and wakes up napping cowherds by hitting them ruggedly with her crutch. The Buschgroßmutter is regionally used to scare the children as is the Buschmutter.

Normally the Buschgroßmutter is a solitary figure, but occasionally she is said to be the leader of a horde of Moosfräulein ("moss ladies"), female forest spirits which are said to be her daughters. Accompanied by her daughters, the Buschgroßmutter roams the countryside in holy nights. At those times, she travels in a little cart or waggon and people try to stay out of her way. Robert Eisel summarizes the typical characteristics of the Buschgroßemutter, as he calls her, in his Sagenbuch des Voigtlandes (Book of Folk Tales from the Voigtland):

"Near Leutenberg, during the holy nights, the Buschgroßemutter wanders around the country with her daughters, the Moosfräuleins. You can recognize her by the staring eyes, the shaggy hair, and her small cart, and it would not be advisable to encounter her." (Translated from the German text)

A folk tale from the Bavarian Forest gives a hint on how much older the Buschgroßmutter might be compared to her descendants. A Moosweibel ("moss woman") traversing the forest at night, described as being hunchbacked and half blind, found three charburners asleep in the forest, their heads placed on a sack of moss and their feet stretched out in different directions. Feeling them, the Moosweibel got the impression of having found a creature with six legs and a single head, the likes of which she had never seen before despite being so old that the knew the Bohemian Forest nine times as pure forest and nine times as consisting of both meadows and forest. So impressed she was, that she hurried home to tell her grandmother, who she said was nine times as old as herself.

In the 19th century, mythologists such as Jacob Grimm or Wilhelm Mannhardt declared the Buschgroßmutter to be the leader or even the queen of the moss people, similar to the elf queen. Ludwig Bechstein, another mythologist of the 19th century, declared her to be identical with legendary creatures such as Hulda or Bertha, which were interpreted as ancient goddesses at that time, basically on the same level as the historically recorded Germanic goddesses. This view was abandoned in early 20th century, thus defining Buschgroßmutter and Buschweibchen as forest demons of the most primitive kind.

== Transylvanian equivalent ==
In traditional folktales of the German-speaking Transylvanian Saxons in Transylvania, today part of Romania, there is a similar being called Baschgrîs ("shrub grandmother"), Baschmôter ("shrub mother") or Baschäinjel ("shrub angel") in Transylvanian Saxon dialect. The standard German names would be Buschgroßmutter, Buschmutter, and Buschengel respectively. All three names are used to scare children and denote a female wood sprite with shaggy fluttering hair, large fiery eyes and very big teeth. Accordingly, a person looking dishevelled and unkempt was called Baschäinjel in 19th century Transylvania.

The Baschmôter, also called Waldfrau ("forest woman"), appears dressed in white to woodcutters and drives them away from their work, particularly when doing something forbidden such as littering the forest or smoking in the woods. She might give a stern warning at first before punishing the repeated act by causing a landslide.

To her favorite humans, the Baschmôter might gift the Springgras ("bursting grass"), a mythical plant formed like a heart with a drop like gold or blood growing in mountain spots where people have been murdered before. The person who gets this plant must cut open the ball of the left hand and allow the plant to grow in. Having thus secured the Springgras, its owner is now able to soundlessly burst all iron with but a touch, particularly for opening fetters, binds, and locks.

The daughters of the Baschmôter are called Waldmaide ("forest maidens", sg. Waldmaid). There are at least two of them, one of them called Lea. They were sometimes caught by people, bound and taken to the village but could always escape. The Waldmaide are said to know the secret uses of dill seed and four-leaf clover. People lost in the woods sometimes end up at the Baschmôter's dwelling. When they manage to entertain her daughters, the Waldmaide, they are gifted plenty of money.

As with the Buschgroßmutter, 19th century mythologist Friedrich W. Schuster tried to establish Baschgrîs and Baschmôter as ancient goddesses and identified them with the Norse underworld goddess Hel.

== Literature ==
- Ludwig Bechstein: Deutsches Sagenbuch. Meiningen 1852. (reprint: F. W. Hendel Verlag, Meersburg/Leipzig 1930.)
- Richard Beitl: Untersuchungen zur Mythologie des Kindes: herausgegeben von Bernd Rieken und Michael Simon. Partially approved: Berlin, University, habilitation treatise R. Beitl, 1933, Waxmann Verlag, Münster/New York/Munich/Berlin 2007, ISBN 978-3-8309-1809-7.
- Robert Eisel: Sagenbuch des Voigtlandes. Gera 1871 (reprint: Verlag Rockstuhl, Bad Langensalza 2003, ISBN 3-936030-68-5)
- Jacob Grimm: Deutsche Mythologie: Vollständige Ausgabe. Berlin 1844. (reprint: Marix-Verlag, Wiesbaden 2014, ISBN 978-3-86539-143-8)
- Josef Virgil Grohmann: Sagen-Buch von Böhmen und Mähren. Prague 1863. (reprint: Holzinger, Berlin 2013, ISBN 978-1-4849-7919-8)
- R. Kühnau: Sagen aus Schlesien. Berlin 1914. (reprint: Salzwasser Verlag, Paderborn 2011, ISBN 978-3-8460-0190-5)
- Wilhelm Mannhardt: Wald und Feldkulte: Band I. Gdańsk 1874. (reprint: Elibron Classics, 2005, ISBN 1-4212-4740-2)
- H. Naumann: Buschgroßmutter, Buschweibchen. In: Hanns Bächtold-Stäubli, Eduard Hoffmann-Krayer: Handwörterbuch des Deutschen Aberglaubens: Band 1 Aal-Butzemann. Berlin 1927. (reprint: Walter de Gruyter, Berlin/New York 2000, ISBN 978-3-11-016860-0)
- Will-Erich Peuckert: Schlesische Sagen. Munich 1924. (reprint: Eugen Diederichs Verlag, Munich 1993, ISBN 3-424-00986-5)
- Leander Petzold: Deutsche Volkssagen. Marix Verlag, Wiesbaden 2007, ISBN 978-3-86539-138-4.
- Heinrich von Wlislocki: Volksglaube und Volksbrauch der Siebenbürger Sachsen. Berlin 1893. (reprint: Forgotten Books, London 2018, ISBN 978-0-4849-7042-6)
