= Perchta =

German Alpine goddess

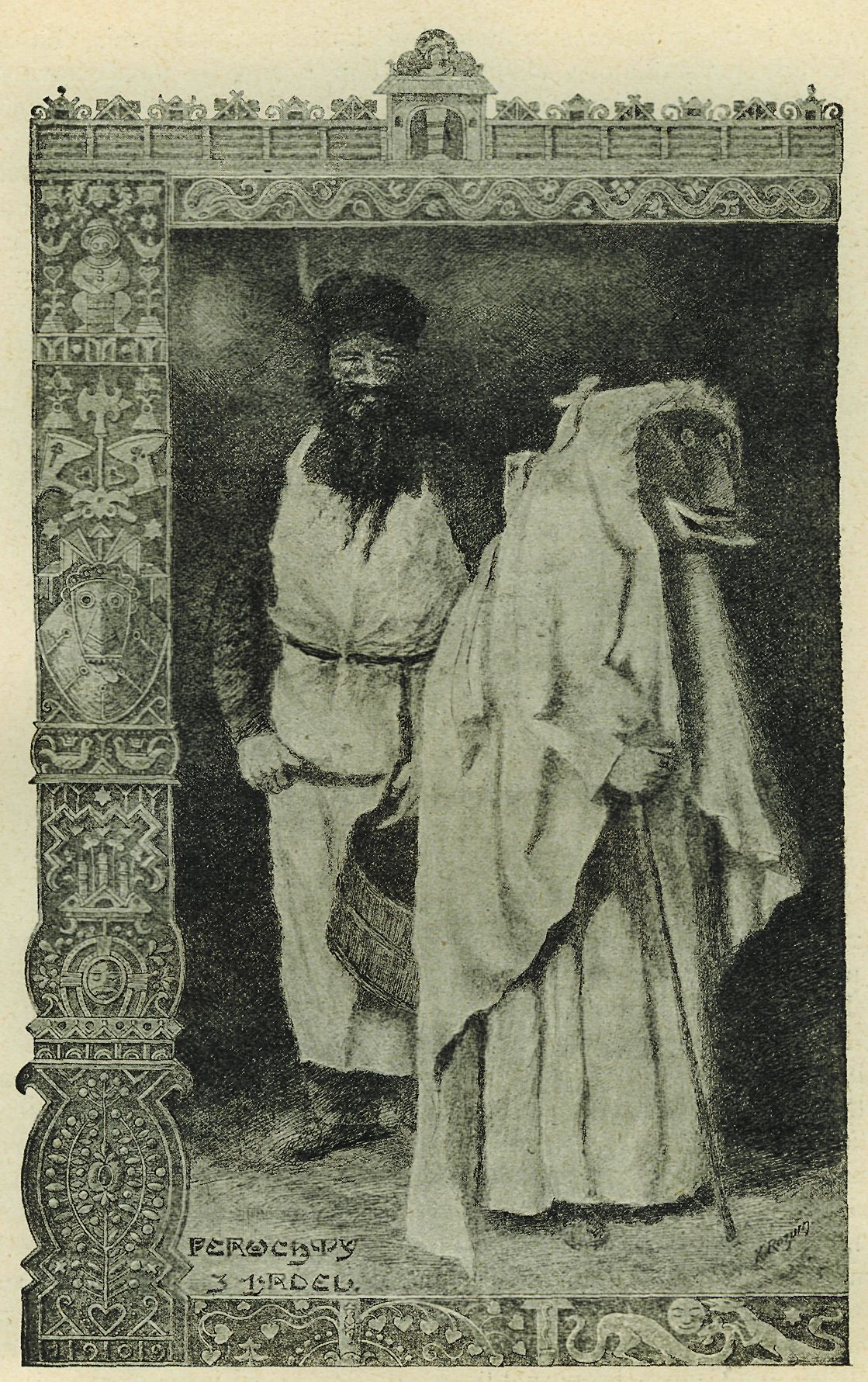
Peruchty in Hrdly, Kingdom of Bohemia, 1910

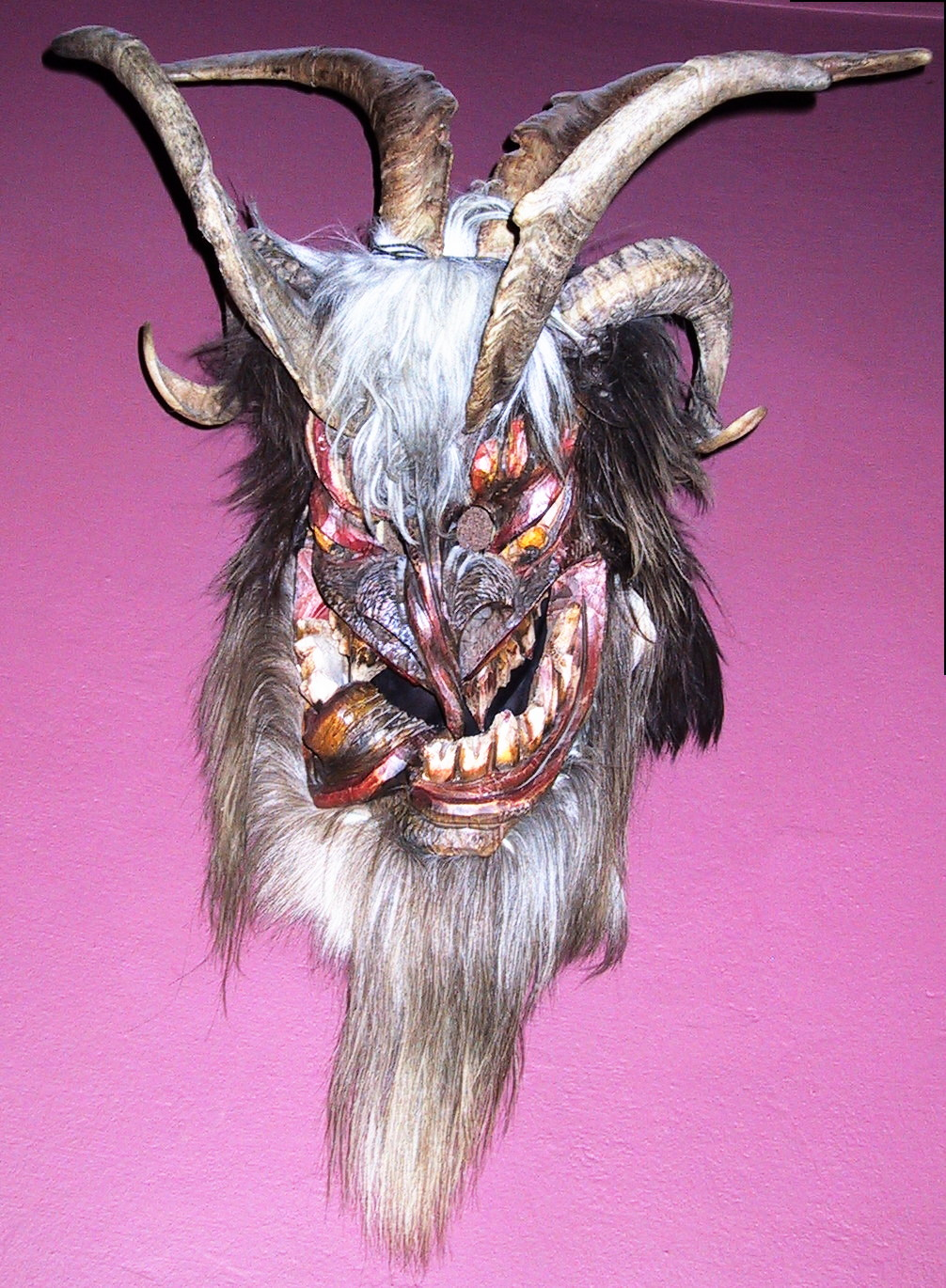
A Perchten mask

Perchta or Berchta ('Bertha'; German: [ˈpɛʁçta, ˈbɛʁçta]), also commonly known as Percht (German: [ˈpɛʁçt]) and other variations, was thought to be a goddess in Alpine paganism in the Upper German and also Austrian and Slovenian regions of the Alps.

The Perchta/Berchta lore holds sway "precisely [in the areas] where Holda leaves off", thus complementing each other. For Perchta is often identified as stemming from the same Germanic goddess as Holda and other female figures of Germanic folklore (see Frija-Frigg). They both oversee spinning, share the role of guardian of woodland beasts. Perchta is Holda's southern cousin or equivalent, as they both share and appear during the Twelve Days of Christmas.

== Nomenclature ==
Perchta, Berchta, or Percht, also variously spelt Perhta, Berchta, Berhta, Bercht (or Berchte,) Perschtl, etc., (Note: Various other spellings are compiled by Liungman (1938), starting with key Aa: Ber(ch)t (-a, -e), Berht, etc.,.. [A]c: Bravaberta (la brava Berta), etc.. d: Perscht Perschtl; e: Percht, Perht(el), Perchta, etc...; g: Pecht(r)a-baba, etc. The list continues with names discussed under § Similar beings.) is a female character with ambivalent traits and a wide range of role in the folklore of Upper Germany/South Germany (especially Bavaria/Swabia but also the Vogtland), Austria (particularly around Salzburg), Italian South Tyrol, Slovene Carinthia, as well as Alsace and Switzerland. (Note: "the bechtelen of Switzerland and of Alsatia,...")

She may be addressed as Frau Percht or Frau Perchta, meaning "Mrs. Perchta".

Perahta is a reconstructed spelling, (Note: "leitet er den Namen her aus einer althochdeutschen Glosse (he derived i from an OHG gloss)".) which Grimm asserted to be the earlier Old High German; see § Etymology for further discussion.

Regional variations of the name include Perchtlgoba (in Styria), Berigl, Berchtlmuada, (Berchtl) Bechtrabab (Perhta-Baba, Perhtra-Baba) Sampa, Stampa, Zampermutta (Zampermuatta, Zamperin), and Rauhweib. (Note: Rauhweib is "rough" or "shaggy wife" which fits Rauhnächte (cf. below).) Some of these names may count as parallels, for which cf. § Similar beings where additional examples such as Posterli, Quatemberca, Fronfastenweiber. (Note: Liungman (FF Communications, 1938) also cited by Carlo Ginzburg) and Pudelfrau, are listed).

The equivalent of the Perchta in Slovene is known as Pehtra Baba, or pehtre baba (generally in Slovene Carinthia/Koroška), (Note: Kuret (1970): "Pehtre babe, kakor so nam ohranjeni danes po vsem Slovenskem Koroškem, tostran Karavank pa le še Pod Korenom. Poročila govoré o obhodih »Pert« še dalje doli po Zgornji Savski dolini.", normalized nominative spelling in Kutin (2016).) but she is also known among the Wends (Slovenes) in Austrian Carinthia as Pechtra,Pehtra Baba, or Perhtra Baba (in Möll valley), etc.; with variants known as Perta or Pêrte (in Bovec, Slovenia), (Note: Attacks with and axe and hacks the leg of the a disbeliever who walks out on Epiphany, but restores the victim to health on a meeting a year later.) and Pehta (localized in Upper Carniola to the north).Kuret (1970), p. 272

The counterpart of the German Perchta/Perchta (Note: Or comparable to the Alpine Perchtenlaufen.) in Czechia, is called Perchta, Peruta, or Parychta, in Bohemia (Perechty in northern Bohemia, peruchty, perychty, or peruty in Central Bohemia) and Šperechta/Šperechty in Moravia. Perchta however has come to denote a mare prop fashioned out of linen in southern Bohemia, so an anthropomorphic (costumed) Perchta needs to be distinguished.

=== Etymology ===
The name of Perchta (and the festival, Perchtenlauf) probably derives from Old High German giberaht naht meaning "Epiphany night".

It was Jacob Grimm who argued that the name stemmed from the Old High German from Perahta signifying the "bright one", but no firm evidence has been shown to substantiate this. Perchta is not attested before the 13th century, (Note: Grimm admits Perchta is not mentioned in literature until around the 14 or 15th centuries, or the 13th century at the earliest. thus the Old High German Perhta figure is unattested.) where she is referred to as "Domina Perchta". (Note: In the Laxdaela saga (c. 1250) Án hrísmagi ("Brushwood-belly") who received his new nickname after dreaming a woman slit his belly and stuffed it with twigs; this may allude to Perchta, as Thomas Hill (2007) has argued.)

If her name can be interpreted as 'the bright one' , it presumably descends from Old High German: beraht, from Proto-Germanic *berhtaz (which would make the name cognate with Berchtentag, meaning 'Epiphany day'). But Eugen Mogk provided an alternative etymology, attributing the origin of the name Perchta to the Old High German verb pergan, meaning 'hidden' or 'covered'. (Note: Mogk (1900) cited by Weber-Kellermann (1978) Mahan (2024), p. 569 and Natko (2014), p. 76)

== Appearance and costume ==
In the Tyrol, she is portrayed as being "a little old woman with a very wrinkled face, bright lively eyes, and a long hooked nose; her hair is disheveled, her garments tattered and torn".

But Perchta has two forms or aspects, the beautiful and the ugly. At Lienz in the Tyrol, the masker (costumed procession participant) portraying the beautiful version dons dresses decked with ribbons and galloons, while those in the other role look hideous, with rats and mice, bells and chains hanging from them.

The historical Bertha Broadfoot (Bertrada of Laon), mother of Charlemagne may have had influence on the conception of Perchta with a strange foot, albeit unwittingly. In many old descriptions, Perchta had one large foot, sometimes called a goose foot or swan foot. Grimm thought the strange foot symbolized her being a higher being who could shapeshift to animal form. He noticed that Bertha with a strange foot exists in many languages (Middle German "Berhte mit dem fuoze", French "Berthe au grand pied", Latin "Berhta cum magno pede", Italian " Berta dai gran piè", title of a medieval epic poem of Italian area): "It is apparently a swan maiden's foot, (Note: i.e., a swan's webbed foot, thus paralleling the splayfoot.) which as a mark of her higher nature she cannot lay aside...and at the same time the spinning-woman's splayfoot that worked the treadle, and that of the trampling dame Stempe or Trempe". (Note: Grimm discusses the trampling dame Stempe (Stempo in Bavarian) earlier, Cf. also notes.)

== Holiday tradition ==
Perchta was said to roam the countryside at midwinter, and to enter homes during the twelve days between Christmas and Epiphany (especially on the Twelfth Night), and the eve of Epiphany was called Berchta's Day. The pertinent period is sometimes referred to as Rauhnächte ("Rough nights"), (Note: And Rauhweib is an alias of Perchta.) usually from St. Thomas's Night (December 21) to Epiphany, thus coinciding with twelfth night. (cf. also Ember days pertinent to § Similar beings)

Perchta was regarded the guardian of the spinstress's occupation, that is to say, she enforced the timely job of spinning duties, usually to be completed before the holidays, or make it taboo to spin during the holidays. Thus, tradition warned that she was particularly concerned to see that girls had spun the whole of their allotted portion of flax or wool during the year. Perchta inspects the distaff on the twelve days, and if any spinstress has left flax or tow unspun, Pertha will scratch the lazy girl's face and smack her fingers, leaving a permanent scar. Or worse, she will slit the culprit's belly and stuff flax inside. The Perchtra-baba shows up in the custom among Slovenes in Möll valley, Carinthia, while the (Sternsinger "star singers") and the Three Kings singers visit house to house.

She would also impose the same kind of cruel punishment for another infringement, namely eating something other than the fish and gruel permitted on fast days; she will slit the fast-breacher's bellies open and stuff them with straw, sewing it up using plowshare for needle and chains for thread. A variant telling states that the victim's slit belly is filled with stone, and the weighed down body sunk in a well; however, the punishment for laziness and the meal infraction could be milder, merely making the perpetrator have a nightmare (Alptraum caused by an Alp).

It is similarly told in Czechia. If children attempt to partake of the Christmas meal too early, they are frightened by the prospect of the Parychta ripping their bellies open. (Note: Jumgman (1831) in Krok II: 365 cited by Máchal (1891)) Or else, the Peruta enforces the fast on Christmas. (Note: If people do not observe the fast on Christmas Day (Christmas Eve), they would be disemboweled by the Peruta by evening (superstition of Vamberk, Bohemia).)

The same Perchta (or Perchta-Holle) who punishes poorly motivated spinners will reward diligent spinners with full spindles, golden threads, and flax tow, and the good maidservant may even find coins (silver groschens) in a bucket (usually at the well). She is also said to be responsible for the growth of the grain. (Note: This description closely fits that of the Holle localized at Frau-Holle-Teich ("Mrs. Holle's Pond") in Hesse, Grimms' Deutsche Sagen No. 4.)

In the Czech Podřipsko region, the Perucht (Peruchty) appears on Christmas Eve, dressed frightfully in furs, holding a knife in a bloody hand, to frighten children.

=== Bogeyman aspect ===
In contemporary culture, this Perchta is portrayed as a "rewarder of the generous, and the punisher of the bad, particularly lying children", but this bogeyman aspect was of a later development, and initially, Perchta's role was to hunt down those who failed to comply with communal taboos, and did not call for such unusual an cruel punishment that did not fit the gravity of the petty crime.

=== Bribes of food ===
The cult venerating Abundia or Satia (called "Fraw Percht" by the common people (Note: Thesaurus Pauperum (Codex Tegernsee 434) quoted in Schmeller's dictionary s.v. "Bercht")) involved followers leaving food and drink for Fraw Percht and her retinue in the hope of receiving wealth and abundance; this practice was condemned in Bavaria in the Thesaurus pauperum (1468), (Note: Codex Tegernsee, Quoted in Schmeller (1872), p. 271.) and by Thomas Ebendorfer von Haselbach's De decem praeceptis (1439).

According to one piece of folktale, a farmwoman of Kalwang, Styria would put out milk as offering to the Perchtl (or Perchtlgoba) as the mistress was called locally; the farmhand working for her was a disbeliever, and endeavoring to debunk the myth, hid in a stove and peeped through a bore hole on the Perchtlnacht (evening on or before Epiphany); but when Perchtlgoba and her retinue of the souls of unbaptized children, she ordered the "opening" to be covered, which caused the man to be struck blind, though he was unblinded when he hid the same way the next Perchtlnacht and she ordered "Uncover the opening". (Note: Krainz (1880), No. 304 "Perchtl Punishes Curiosity", cited by Waschnitius (1913), p. 18.)

== Ward of children ==
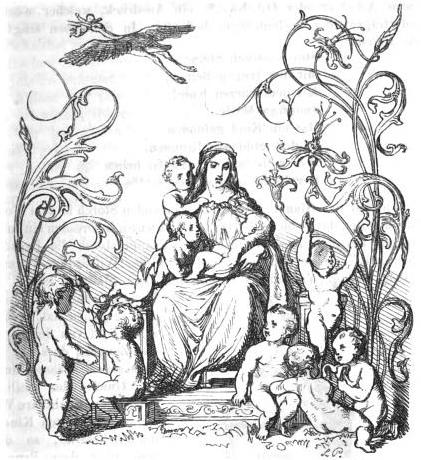
Holda in children's spring

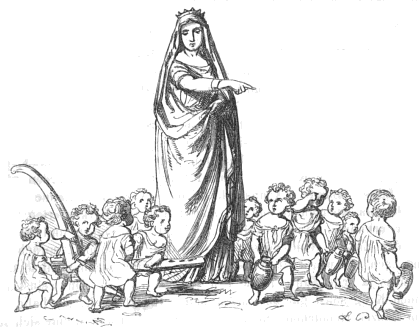
Perchta with Heimchen

—Woodblock prints by Ludwig Pietsch in Mannhardt (1860)

The Perchta-Holle conflation is observed for the female supernatural seen as guardians of the children's souls and associated with water-springs.

Such a Frau Holle (or Perchta-Holle) is associated with Frau-Holle-Teich ("Mrs. Holle's Pond") in Hesse, who enforces spinning threads, is also associated with children in many ways. She heals and bestows fertility upon women who steep themselves in her well, which is located near Meißner in Hesse. (Note: Frau-Holle-Teich is approx. 5km west of Meißner.) Newborn infants are engendered in this well, and she brings them into the world, according to folklore. (Note: & Waschnitius (1913), p. 89 cited by Mahan (2024), p. 555 and Motz (1984), p. 155) Similarly, Berchta is said to dwell in a Tyrolean cave, cohabitating with unborn children, and women wishing to give birth must visit upon the divinity at this landmark (near Lusarn, i.e. Luserna in the now Italian South Tyrol) in order to be successful. (Note: Motz (1984), p. 155, citing & Waschnitius (1913), p. 35)

The Perchta-Holle of the well in Hesse will also snatch children into her pond: the good ones she transforms into children of fortune, turning the naughty ones into changelings. Perchta (Perchtl) is said to be followed by a retinue of children who died unbaptized. (Note: Mahan (2024), p. 555 citing Motz (1984), p. 155 and Waschnitius (1913), p. 18, ultimately sourceable to Krainz (1880), No. 304)

== Festival ==
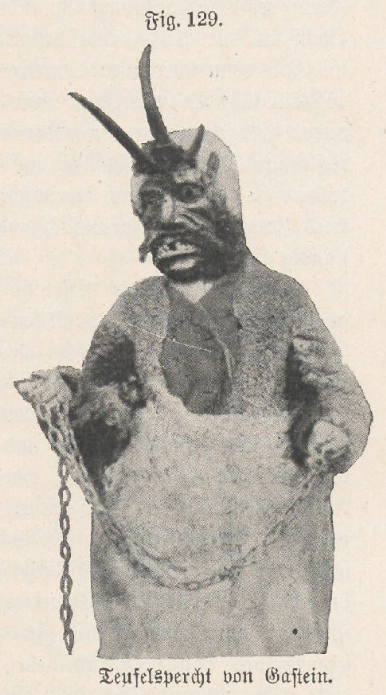
Devil-Perchten of Gastein, c. 1904

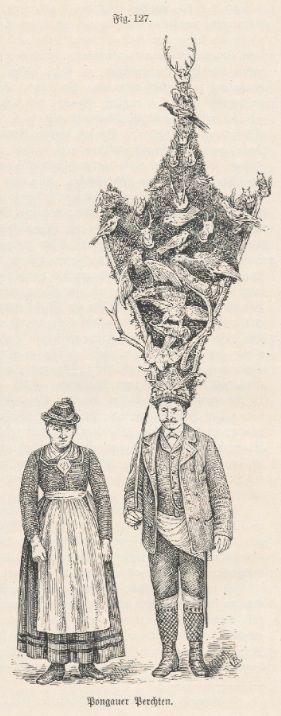
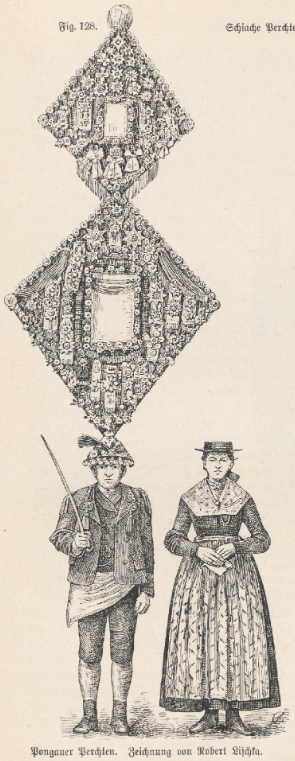
Schöne Perchten man with tall headdress, and a "G'sellin" boy in woman's dress. St. Johann in the Pongau District, Salzburg. Illustr. Robert Lischka.

External image
- Teufelsfratzen ("devil grimaces", "devil heads") and beastheads in Perchtenlauf.— Watercolor by Ulf Seidl (1929)

The festival itself is called Perchtenlauf (the "Perchten run" or "race"), (Note: Similar to the Schembartlauf of Nuremberg.) (Note: Cf. Ulf Seidl (1929), text with a painting of the Perchten maskers.)

The Berchtenlaufen is mentioned by Lorenz Hübner (1796), and described as a tradition practiced in those heydays all over the Pongau and Pinzgau districts. Back in those days, something on the order of 100 to 300 participants would be involved, disguised in comical masks and toting weapons while they danced around in broad daylight, especially at Pinzgau. Another early accounts given by Friedrich von Spaur (Note: Friedrich Franz Joseph von Spaur (1756–1821), son of Franz Joseph von Spaur, Pflaum und Valeur.) in 1800, traveling through the Pinzgau region of the State of Salzburg.

Around the turn of 20th century (c. 1904), the participating area had dwindled to pockets in the area such as St. Johann and Gastein in the Pongau District, or Krimml and Zell am See in the Pinzgau district. And the district courts of Zell am See and Mittersill issued bans forbidding people from participating as the "ugly" Perchten.

An account of the procession of the Schiache or "Ugly" Perchten, from an informant who witnessed it in the first half of the 19th century, was that about a dozen men from neighboring villages enacting the Perchten would meet at the appointed place to march together. They were clad in sheepskin and wore badger skin caps, leather belts affixed with bells. They wore carved wooden masks with crudely humanlike visages, though with elongated teeth and long horns, or wore beast-basks, with beaks, bristles, or movable jaws. They carried torches or lamps surmounted on staffs. There were sub-characters in the retinue, such as the fools and she-fools (Lapp, Lappin), and the jester carried a sausage-shaped roll stuffed with wool, with which he would mischievously whack onlooking women who were his acquaintances. There would also be a quack doctor (Oeltrager) carrying a load of snake oils and ointments in his basket.

As for Schöne or "Beautiful" Perchten, around 1900, both in Bad Gastein and St. Johann, the Schöne Perchten had been portrayed by a man wearing an enormously tall headdress, heavily decorated, weighing 40–50 pounds (18–23 kg), often supported on metal frames borne on his shoulders. He was accompanied by "G'sellin" (feminine of Geselle, "associate") enacted by a boy in woman's dress (cf. image left). Some in Gastein wore a variant version of headdress, like a cone-shaped fish trap made of willow withes as framework, and covered with various decorations.

(Cf. § Modern celebrations describing mostly the present-day version)

== Interpretations ==
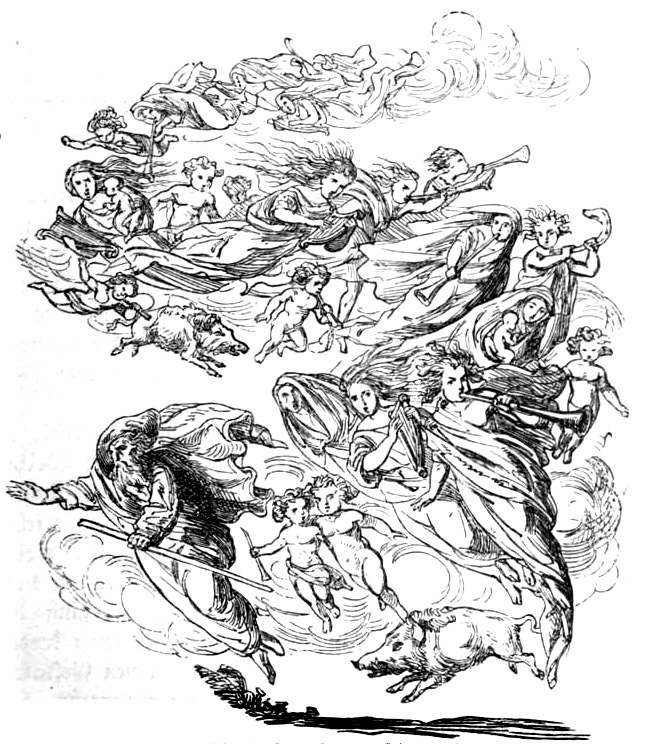
Frau Holle (Perchta) among the Furious Host —Woodblock print by Ludwig Pietsch. Reprinted with caption in Reinsberg-Düringsfeld (1863). Das festliche Jahr; originally published in Mannhardt (1860).

According to Jacob Grimm (1882), Perchta was spoken of in Old High German in the 10th century as Frau Berchta and thought to be a white-robed goddess who oversaw spinning and weaving, like the myths of Holda. He believed she was the feminine equivalent of Berchtold, and was sometimes the leader of the Wild Hunt. However, Perchta could be explained as the personification of the feast of the Epiphany (Perchta's Day), which would mean it was not of pre-Christian mold, (Note: Hopkin, citing John B. Smith) as will be explained further below.

Occasional modern sources still assert Perchta was originally a pre-Christian deity, perhaps, e.g., an "earth goddess". (Note: Jones, Alison (1995) Larousse Dictionary of World Folklore. Edinburgh and New York. p. 64 on Perchta: "thought to have originally been a goddess, like [Hulda], perhaps the Earth goddess Hulda" quoted by Smith (2004), p. 168.)

However, modern scholarship has challenged the claimed connection with pagan mythography. One thesis paper asserts "no direct connection between the mythical figure and the processions", and from that standpoint, it may suffice to characterize the Perchtenlauf as merely a practice of "popular merriment" as even some 18th or 19th century writers had characterized the occasion. (Note: Kürsinger, Ignatz von (1841) Chapter "Voksbelustigungen..", p. 164 in and Hübner (1796) in paragraph starting "Unter die Voksbelustigungen..", mentioning Kuhetreiber (prob. Almabtrieb) then subsequently the "Bercht", which is also referred to as "diese Spektakel".) Ingeborg Weber-Kellermann also writes "Tracing the names back to a specific female pagan deity associated with the Yule season is typical of the Grimms' Romantic-mythological approach to scholarship", (Note: "Die Rückführung der Namen auf eine bestimmte heidnische weibliche Gott- heit , die ihren Umgang in der Julzeit hatte, ist typisch für die romantisch - mytho- logische Wissenschaftsauffassung der Grimms",) and notes that a contemporary such as Johann Andreas Schmeller (1782–1852) thought Perchta could be sufficiently explained to be the personification of the Christian calendar day. (Note: Note however that Schmeller goes on to state that the "Cultus perhaps reaches back to the pre-Christian era of our people", allowing for the possibility of pagan origin.) Grimm's protege Wilhelm Mannhardt did not strictly subscribe to his mentor's view on this, but developed it into a view that she was a pagan personification of the forces of Nature.

The folk belief in Diana/"Fraw Percht" roaming the night leading a train of women is attested in the exegesis issued by the Dominican Johann Herolt in his Sermones dominicales (c. 1418), (Note: "Qui credunt quod Diana, quae vulgariter dicitur fraw Percht cum exercitu suo de nocte solet ambulare per multa spatia terrarum", Poll. 583, f. 66. [Cod. 583 f. 66, bibl. canoniae Pollinganae, containing Discipuli= Joh. Heroldt, Sermones dominicales.]) is interpreted to hint at the divinity's involvement in the Wild Hunt. (Note: Mahan also asserts that the aforementioned Thesaurus Pauperum, Bavarian manuscript from Tegernsee (1483) "mentions several motifs characteristic of early modern Perchta legends for the first time, including the Wild Hunt"..)

The 20th century position held by Otto Höfler and Lily Weiser-Aall that the Perchtenlauf echoes the pre-Christian band of rowdy men, in turn tied to the Wild Hunt and Furious Host, is nowadays marginalized, and surpassed by an approach that finds Perchta to be a form of fertility spirit, but with a more complex, "multi-layered tradition" underlying it; interpretative studies along this line has been conducted from both folkloristic and philological approaches, and its exponents include Erika Timm and Marianne Rumpf. For Rumpf, Domina Perchta was like unto Frau Welt (female personification of the "World"") or Luxuria (female personification of "Lust"), and merely a metonym (type of allegory) for "human society from the Middle Ages to the Baroque".

== Modern celebrations ==
The tradition has been held most strongly around Pongau and Pinzgau in the state, although also practiced in adjacent areas such as the Tyrol, and the Berchtesgadener Land in Bavaria, Germany.

The Perchten are still a traditional part of holidays and festivals (such as the Carnival Fastnacht). The wooden animal masks made for the festivals are today called Perchten. Or alternatively, the men and boys in costume participating in the "run" are called Perchten. The Perchtenlauf is held on various dates depending on locale, anywhere from December 5 to Shrovetide, though most commonly on Epiphany (January 6) or the eve before.

Today in Austria, the celebration also occurs in the city of Salzburg, where she is said to wander through Hohensalzburg Castle in the dead of night.

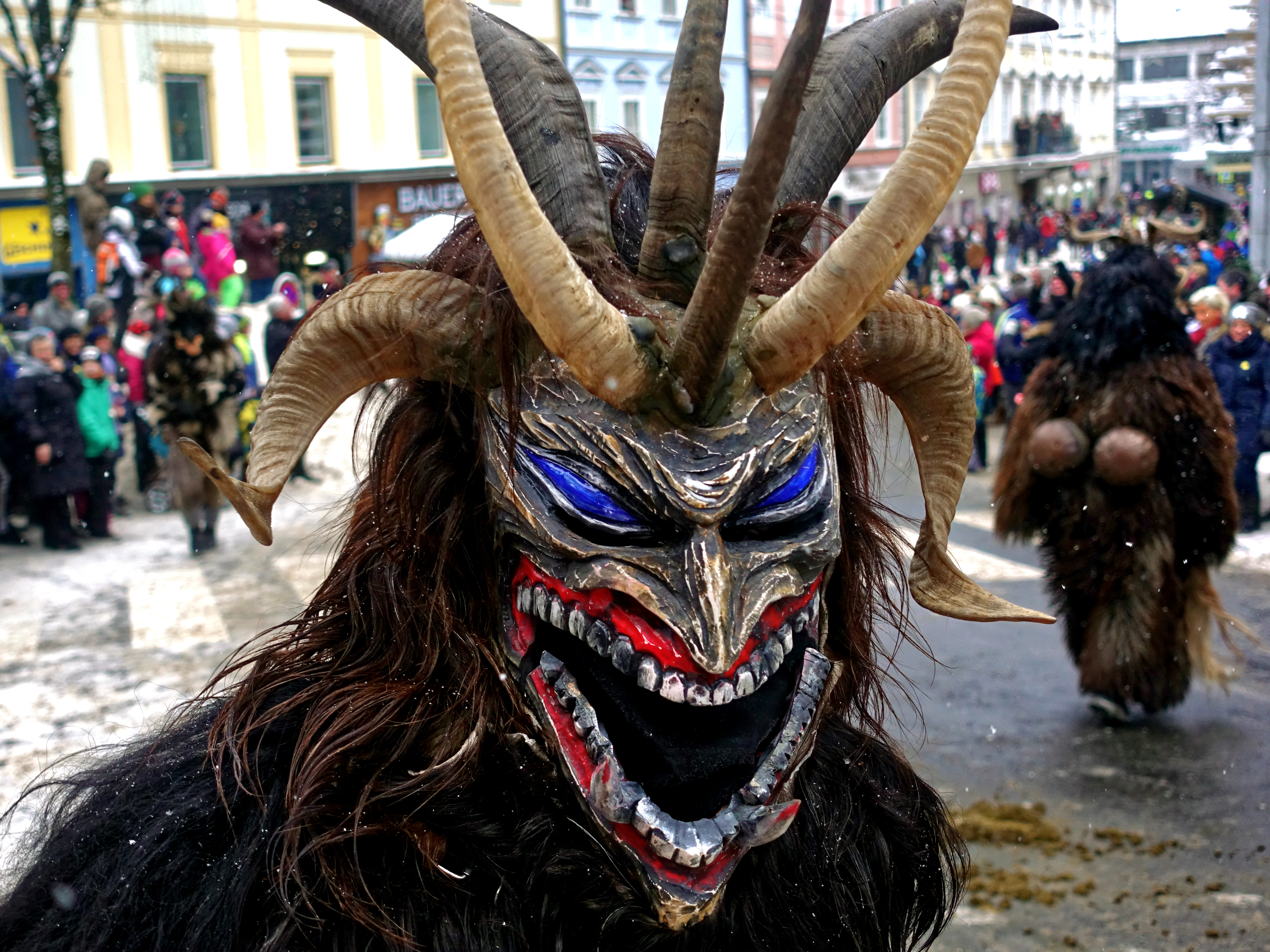
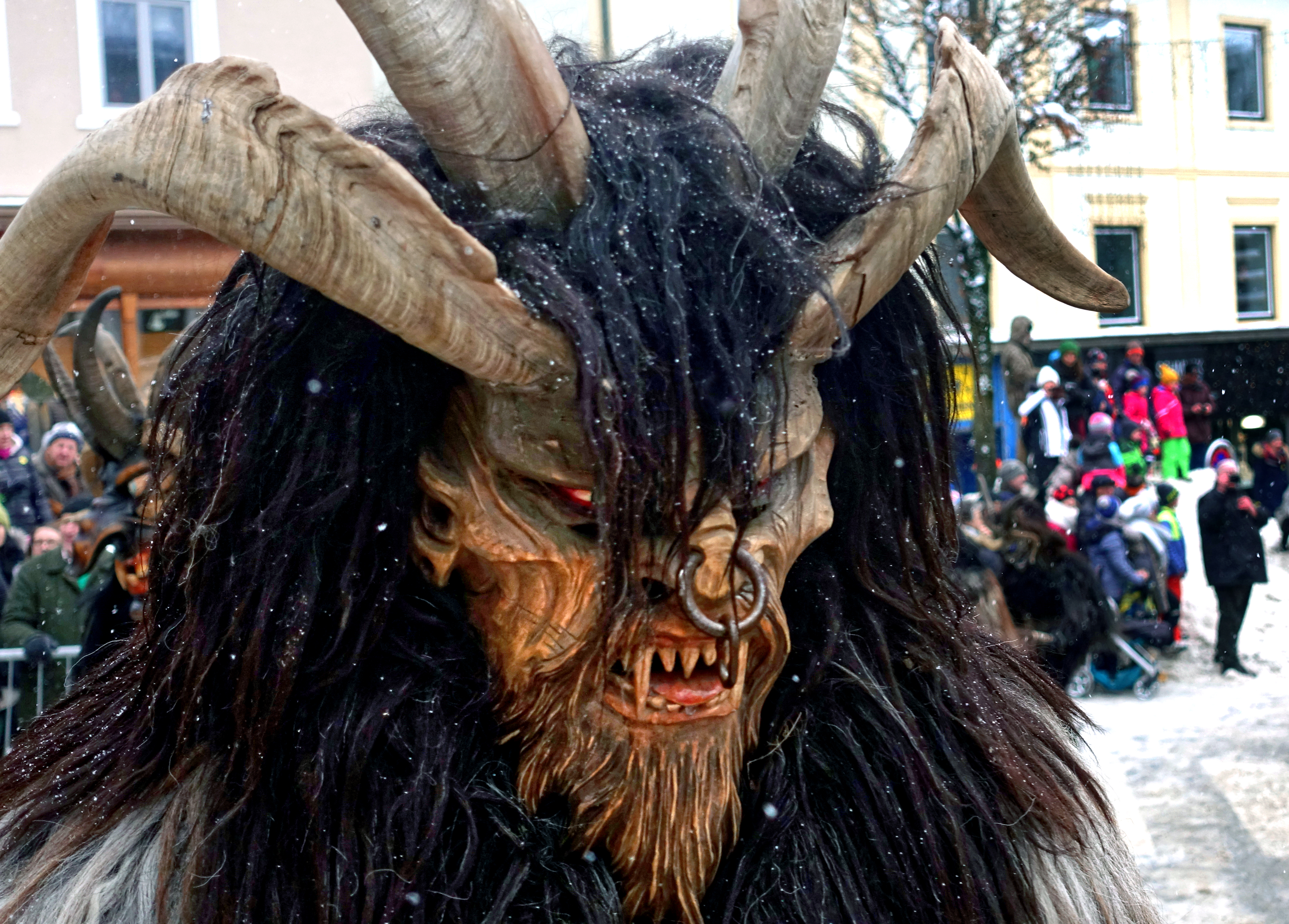
Schiechperchten at the er Perchtenlauf in St. Johann im Pongau District, 2017

External images
- Schiache Perchte ("foul" Perten)
- Schiache Perchte ("ugle" Perten), Perchtenlauf in the Gastein Valley in Salzburg

In the Pongau region of Austria large processions of Schönperchten ("beautiful Perchten") and Schiachperchten ("ugly Perchten") are held every winter, during the Twelve Nights and festivals to "bring luck and wealth to the people". The masks (of the "ugly" Schiachperchten) have fangs, tusks and horse tails to impale or punish damned souls, or alternatively, "the beautiful masks encouraging financial windfalls, and the ugly masks worn to drive away evil spirits".

The horse tail (Rossschwanz) and birch switch are now part of the standard equipment. (Note: Though it is understood here that Perchtenlauf mummers intermingle as Krampus participants. Krampus uses horse tail, cow tail, or willow switch to strike according to the latter source, so the distinction is slight.) Cow tail was also mentioned as the Perchtenlauf equipment in the past (c. 1900) during the period when the ugly ("schieche") Perchten remained banned since 1848: a pair of jesters, one armed with a cow's tail filled with sand, the other with a canvas sleeve filled with tow, with which they would smite ladies and girls.

Other regional variations include the Tresterer in the Austrian Pinzgau district, the stilt dancers in the town of Unken, the Schnabelpercht or Schnabelperchten ("trunked Percht") in the Unterinntal region and the Glöcklerlaufen ("bell-running") in the Salzkammergut. A number of large ski resorts have turned the tradition into a tourist attraction drawing large crowds every winter.

== Similar beings ==
There are other wandering female beings in the folklore of German-speaking parts of the world, such as Stempa, Stampa, Gstampa, Posterli, Strägele/Sträggele, Frau Faste, the Fronfastenwivele (neuter gender, i.e., diminutive), the Quatemberca, and Italian Befana.

Names such as Fronfastenweiber (var. Fronfastenwivele above) and Quatemberca are obviously related to Ember days (German: Fronfasten or Quatember). (Note: Technically Quatember is the "Catholic fast period occurring four times annually",) There is also the appellation Frau Faste, which has been listed as synonymous to Posterli or Quatember. "Frau Faste" is a term used in Swabia and Switzerland (also used in Baden, and Slovenian regions) and according to Grimm, "Frau Faste" is a corrupted pronunciation of "Fronfasten". According to Swiss tradition, "Frau Faste" forbids all sorts of activity (laundry, harvest) during the four Ember Days of the year; she also demands that flax be spun before the period (much like the Frau Holle or Krungeli/Chlungeli (Note: Chlungeri, var. Chulungere(n), Chlungeli(n), Chlunge, Chluglerin, Klunglerin, etc.) which appear in the Christmas season), if one braids hair during the Ember days, the spirit causes hair to fall off (lore of Neerach, Canton of Zurich).

The Posterli and Sträggele resemble both Berhta and Holda. For the Sträggele is the witch who haunts the city during the Ember days, especially Wednesday, while Posterli is the version in Entlebuch (in the canton of Lucerne) of the female fiend who participates in the rowdy processions mostly on the Thursday before Christmas. (Note: Posterli and Sträggele are also described in The Grimms' Deutsche Sagen (1816), No. 269, which compares them to the Türst, the storm witch that haunts the city of Lucerne.)

Among the Slovenes living in Carniola or the Austrian states of Carinthia and Styria, a male form of Perchta was known as Quatembermann or in Slovene, Kvaternik (German transcription: Kwaternik). He, together with his wife, was a sort of Perchta forbidding the act of spinning on Saturdays (and Wednesdays) of the Ember weeks. (Note: Quatembermann can intrude a home or room through a keyhole, though he is a tall, gaunt man; he snatches flax from spinning maids spinning on an Ember Saturday; bites peoples hands, and sets the house on fire.)

This female that forbade spinning on the twelve days is called Kvaternica in Western Croatia, etc.

Grimm thought that her male counterpart or equivalent was Berchtold.

There is a similar wandering spirit Lucia in eastern Central Europe and the north (Scandinavia). In Austria, Lucy's day for warding off the witch is celebrated mostly in the states of Burgenland and Niederösterreich. This being falls under the framework of the Lutzelfrau=Lucia conflation, associated with Sankt Lucia (Saint Lucy of Syracuse) and denoting a "luminous" (German: leuchtende) entity. She is also locally called Lutzl.

In Czechia, she is known as Lucie, Lucka, or Louce In the Slovene language, this Perchta-like mask entity is called Lucija. The name Pudelfrau or Pudelmutter has also been considered a local variant, and it has been suggested that Pudelfrau may be just a corruption of Lutzelfrau. (Note: "wohl aus Lutzelfrau entstellten Namen Pudelfrau")

It has been proposed that the dark mythical feminine figure "Percht" was eventually "displaced or replaced" by the "Lucia". (Note: By J. Hanika, apud Kretzenbacher (1959), p. 71) Some commentators prefer to classify the aforementioned Lutzl (and Pudelfrau) as aliases of Perchta, while others prefer to compare the Lutzelfrau and Pudelfrau to be more akin to each other. (Note: As both engage in pudeln ("pelting"?) children who were lured by men dressed as St. Nikolaus as if promising gifts.)

Grimm argued there are many parallels between Holda and the mythical Berta/Bertha to consider, while the Weiße Frauen may derive directly from Berchta in her white form.

Grimm also pointed to parallels between Holda, Diana, Herodias, and Abundia as parallels. The 15th century Thesaurus Pauperum (Codex Tegernsee 434) glosses Habundia (Abundia) and Satia (both aspects of Diana) as equivalent to the goddess commonly called Fraw Percht or Perchta.

Grimm regards Perchta as "bright" or "shining" (as already discussed under § Etymology), hence argues parallel to moon goddess Selene aka Lucina or Luna, and therefore to Artemis (Diana).

Perchta is also the Queen of the Heimchen, according to the lore of Thuringia.

Perchta is closely similar to Latin and Greek Faun and other mythological figures such as Krampus.

== In popular culture ==
Slovene storyteller Peter Jakelj-Smerinjekov told tales about Pehta to ethnographer Milko Matičetov during tht 1950s and 60s. Perchta was also depicted in the well-known Slovene film Kekec as teta Pehta, the old woman living in the mountains who supposedly steals children and knows how to use medicinal plants.

== See also ==
- Perchtenlaufen
- Baba Yaga – Slavic mythological figure
- Befana – Figure in Italian folklore
- Frau Holle
- Kallikantzaros - similar Greek demon of Christmastide, with cognates in Slavic countries
- Krampus – Christmas figure in Alpine folklore
- Lutzelfrau – Witch of German folklore
- Nornir - Old Norse divinities associated with yarn, spinning
- Oliebol – Traditional Dutch and Belgian food
- Paraskeva of the Balkans aka Saint Petka, Sfânta Vineri - Holy Friday/Venusday (the day of Freya or Venus)
- Pre-Christian Alpine traditions
- Schembartlauf
- Spillaholle – German legendary creature and fairy tale
- Swabian-Alemannic-Fastnacht
- Weiße Frauen
- Wild Hunt
- shulikuny - similar Russian demon that appears around Christmastide
