= Heimchen =

German legendary creature

The Heimchen (sg., pl.; German: [ˈhaɪ̯mçən]) is a being from German folklore with several related meanings.

In the first place, Heimchen (diminutive of Heim = home) is the German term for house cricket. The house cricket is one of the animal appearances taken by dwarves, as is also attested by the dialectal names such as Herdschmiedl (hearth smith) and Heunemänken (Mänken = manikin).

In North Palatinate and Western Palatinate, the house cricket, there known as Krikelmaus (Maus = mouse), is a nursery bogey used to scare children.

In Pomerania, the Heimchen feed lost children with bread rolls and milk instead.

In Silesia, the stridulating house cricket indicates the presence of a deceased soul.

== The mountain folk ==
In the Vogtland, the Heimchen are little beings, nary two feet tall, who dwell on a great meadow inside a mountain cave lit as bright as day by a big carbuncle gem. There, flowers made from gems are blooming and a melodic humming, not unlike harp music, can be heard. The entrance is not always open, and the Heimchen or Bergvolk (mountain folk), as they call themselves, are not always visible to human eyes. Those Heimchen keep golden sheep no bigger than lambs whose shepherdess, Ilsa, is an enchanted girl dressed in white with a golden shepherd's staff who is waiting for her redemption.

== The retinue of Perchta ==
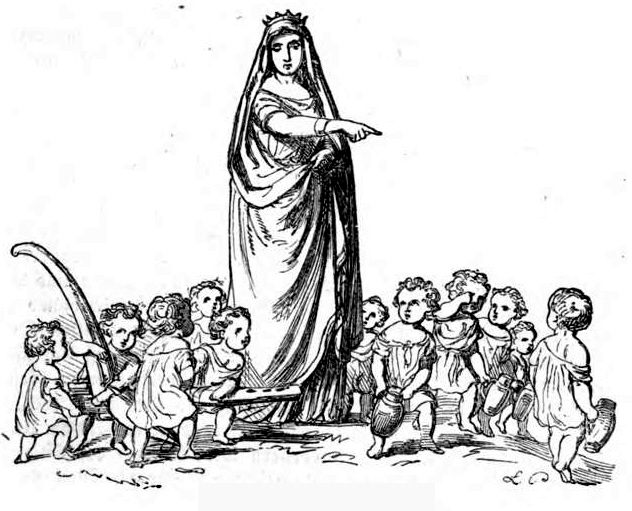
Perchta and the Heimchen. —Woodcut by Ludwig Pietsch (1860) reprinted in Reinsberg (1863)

The Heimchen are imagined to be the wailing souls of unbaptized children, accompanying Perchta as their leader, according to the lore of Thuringia, (Note: Bechstein, #168,) especially the Saalthal (valley of Saale) stretching from Bucha toWilhelmsdorf, including the Orlagau mentioned below. (Note: Bechstein TS (1898) #229 describes the two doomed villages of Cosdorf und Rödern as being in the Saal river system corridor from Bucha to Wilhelmsdorf, but also identifies the villages as Orlagau villages.)

She is called Heimchenkönigin, i.e. Heimchen-Queen in one local tale. There is also a belief that a stridulating Heimchen or house cricket sits on the nose of Percht.

In the Orlagau in Thuringia (Note: Orlasenke, the "basin of the Orla", a tributary of the Saale on its right bank.) the Heimchen, who are also called Heimele, Butzelmännchen (little bogeymen), and Erdmännele (earth manikins), are thought of as tiny earth spirits, as tall as a finger is long, who dwell in the mouse holes of houses. They regularly appear in the evening, dressed in white, of cheerful disposition, with hundreds of them dancing some round dance in the meadow. They indicate beforehand whether the house dwellers will meet good or bad luck and, if well taken care of, at times might also place gifts in front of their mouse hole in the morning. Those gifts are said to be delectable and very dainty, being found in small golden caskets. The friendly, childishly gay, playful little dwarves love to help humans unseen, be it that they tend to fields and cattle or keep watch on children whose parents are absent.

According to legend, there once stood the villages of Cosdorf and Rödern in the Orlagau (or in the Saal river corridor south of Bucha) the Heimchen once diligently helped the farmers with their work in the abovementioned way which made the area exceptionally wealthy. One day, though, a serious man came from afar who told the people that Perchta isn't to be trusted as the Heimchen are the souls of unbaptized children. When the people then avoided the Heimchen, Perchta decided that it was time to leave, and she and the Heimchen crossed the stream never to return again. (Note: Waschnitius (1913) and citing it.)

== Literature ==
- Ludwig Bechstein: Deutsches Sagenbuch. Meiningen 1852. (reprint: F. W. Hendel Verlag, Meersburg/Leipzig 1930.)
- Ludwig Bechstein: Thüringer Sagenbuch: Band 2. Coburg 1858. (reprint: Verlag Rockstuhl, Bad Langensalza 2014.)
- Ludwig Bechstein: Die goldene Schäferei. In: Ingeborg Haun, Jacob Grimm, Wilhelm Grimm, Hans Christian Andersen, Ludwig Bechstein, Wilhelm Hauff: Die schönsten Märchen. (Book without year, place and publisher. Germany, likely 2nd half of the 20th century.)
- Eckstein: Semmel. In: Hanns Bächtold-Stäubli, Eduard Hoffmann-Krayer: Handwörterbuch des Deutschen Aberglaubens: Band 7 Pflügen-Signatur. Berlin 1936. (reprint: Walter de Gruyter, Berlin/New York 2000, ISBN 978-3-11-016860-0)
- Riegler: Grille. In: Hanns Bächtold-Stäubli, Eduard Hoffmann-Krayer: Handwörterbuch des Deutschen Aberglaubens: Band 3 Freen-Hexenschuss. Berlin 1931. (reprint: Walter de Gruyter, Berlin/New York 2000, ISBN 978-3-11-016860-0)
