= Das verfluchte Jungfernloch =

Coordinates: 50°57′39″N 10°18′34″E

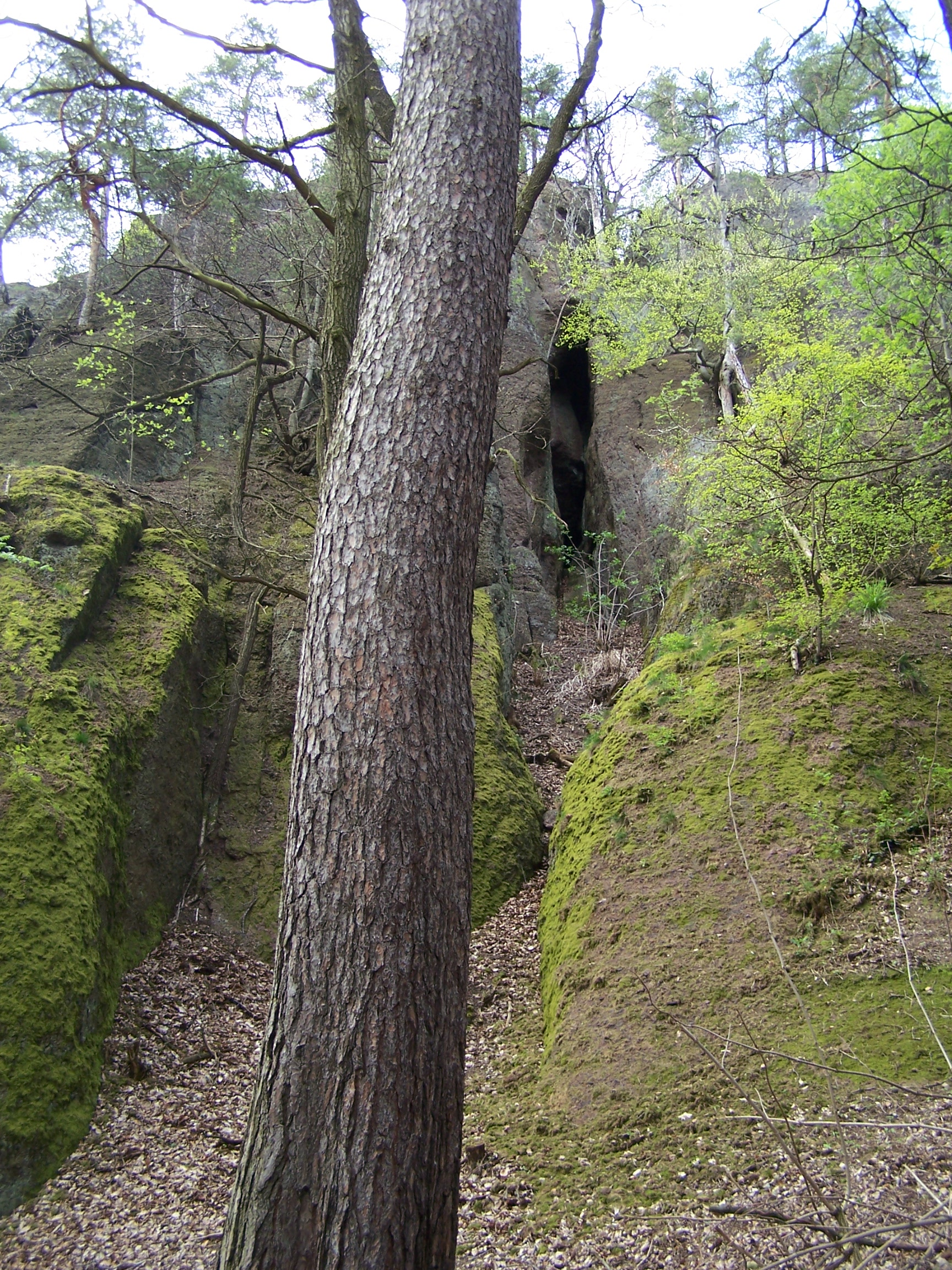
Cave entrance

Das verfluchte Jungfernloch (German, literally "The damned maiden's hole") is a small rock cave on the eastern slope of a hill overlooking the Kälbergrund Valley in Eisenach, Germany, roughly 500m south of the Wartburg.

It is the subject of a legend first attested in an anonymous collection of Volkssagen (folktales) published in Eisenach in 1795 and later retold by Ludwig Bechstein among others. It tells of a fair maiden who never made it to church because she could never decide which one of her many fancy dresses to wear and was therefore cursed by her mother. Her ghost has been haunting the cave ever since, but she can only be seen every seven years, sitting at the cave's entrance and crying bitter tears as she combs her golden hair ("like the Lurlei on the Rhine").

== Sources ==
- Ludwig Bechstein: Deutsches Sagenbuch. Georg Wigand, Leipzig 1853.
- Heinrich Weigel: Das "Verfluchte Jungfernloch" - Realität und Fama um eine Klufthöhle in der Eisenacher Burg. In: Heimatblätter '93 des Eisenacher Landes. (=EP-Report 4) 1993, p. 96-99.
