= Lutzelfrau =

Witch of German folklore

Lutzelfrau (German: [ˈlʊtsl̩ˌfʁaʊ]) or Lutscherl in Eastern Austria, Luz, Luzi, or Luzel in the Bavarian forest, is a witch in German folklore who gives gifts — particularly apples, nuts and dried plums — to children on Saint Lucy's Day (December 13), but also has a "dark Lucia" side (dunkle Luz in Bavaria, and among the German populace (as dunkle Luzia) in outlying neighboring countries. This dark, or malevolent Lutzelfrau is reputed to may disembowel (or drown) naughty children and reward the well-behaved ones with rewards of fruit.

== Nomenclature ==
While Lutzefrau serves as one standardized generic name for the tradition in the Alpine areas of Austria and Bavaria, Germany, in parts of Austria, she is more simply called Lucia. Around Burgenland, she is known as Luzia, Lutzl, or Fersenlutzl. (Note: "Dergleichen gab es freilich, das bezeugt unsere Luzia, Lutzl, Luzi, Fersen-lutzl usf. im Burgenland")

=== Etymology ===
Lutzelfrau is of course associated with Sankt Lucia (Saint Lucy of Syracuse) and Lucia is a name signifying "luminous" (German: leuchtende).

Local historian Gustav Gugitz has ventured the guess that the name of the similar or companion being Pudelfrau (Pudlfrau) might be a corruption of Lutzelfrau. (Note: "wohl aus Lutzelfrau entstellten Namen Pudelfrau") However, a more rational explanation is also offered, which is that the name alludes to the Pudelfrau's traditionally-told habit of rolling her gifts of nuts or apples through the crack in the doorway, and this act is called Hereinpudeln meaning "rolling in" or "tossing in".

=== Regional names ===
In Czechia, she is known as Lucie or Louce, etc. In Slovakia, she is called Lucka.

Lutzelfrau customs are also common in Slovenia and Croatia, where a "dark Luz" was contrasted to the Christian saint. In Slovene, she is called Lucija.

== Appearance and costume ==
External image
- Lussi & jolesvein — Sketch by Leiv (Larsson) Mæle (1890-1971), from Weiser-Aall, Lily (Dec. 1950), Julenissen (NEG 29 #5830).

According to a mid-19th century source, the Lucia of Bohemia and Tyrol appeared as a goat, draped in a bedsheet with horns protruding out of the sheet. This is paralleled in Scandinavia. The Norwegian Lussia sketched by Leiv Mæle (b. 1890) shows a goat headed Lussia wearing a skirt, a costume used in Forsand, Rogaland; it suggests connection with the Yule goat (cf. linked external image right). There are accounts of Lussebock from Västergötland and Värend (Island), Sweden, (Note: Gunnel citing Celander, Hilding (1928) Nordisk jul, p. 45) as well as the Swedish Lussiner dressed in goat form.

== Tradition ==
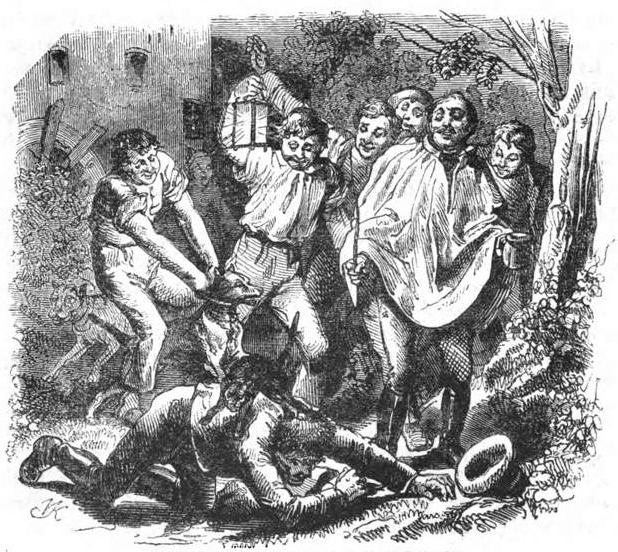
Rural pranks on St. Luzie's night. —engraving by Vinzenz Katzler (pub. 1863)

In Austria, Lucy's day for warding off the witch is celebrated mostly in the states of Burgenland and Lower Austria (Niederösterreich), or more precisely, "central eastern part of Styria, over central and southern Burgenland, and a small southeastern district of Lower Austria" describes the narrow band of area where the "Dark Lucia" folklore is carried.

In Burgenland, Lutzelfrau or Pudlfrau visits the children on St. Lucia's day and "tosses (pudelt) sweets through the doorway. (Note: Geramb (1924), pp. 104, 112 cited by Sartori, HdA, n40)

However in Burgenland or Lower Austria (esp. Mank), the witch that appeared on Lucia's night was the object of terror. Certain items were deemed needed to ward off spells and curses of the witch on Lucy's day. One of these apotropaic items was the so-called "Jew's coal" (Judenkohle, charcoal remaining from the fire lit on Easter Sunday). This charcoal, combined with frankincense and wood from a blackthorn bush is then set in an iron censer and ignited. The household then recites the prescribed incantation:

Voarn Drudendrupa, Hegenboagsen,
Daiflsbroazen, Zauwrafougsen,
B'ichiz mich d'balche Luzte,
Dis t muaring Frub oaffteh!

Translation:

Protect me, Saint Lucy,
from the Drude's [stamping] oppression, the witches' feet,
devil's paws, and sorcerers' handiwork,
until I rise tomorrow morning!

The prayer is repeated once again before going to bed, but as an extra caution, one traces the sign of the cross with the left foot, to repel the witch from encroaching upon the bed.

On Lucia's feast night, between midnight and 1 o'clock, girls will visit a willow tree by a stream, and on the sunny side of the tree, pare the bark halfway upwards (i.e. without detaching), and with a Schnizer (type of knife) carve a "Luzi[e]'s cross" or Luzienkreuz (X\X or XX\XX\XX, slanted diagonally downwards; or (Note: diagonally downwards as shown in Vernaleken (1858), but reproduced as diagonally upwards (and mirror-imaged) by Reisenberg-Dueringsfeld (1863). Geram represents the inscribed mark as "^{+}∣_{+}".)) under the rind. This cross is moistened with the stream water, then the bark-flap is placed back (over the cross), and secured by binding it around. Then on New Year's day, when the mark is examined to divine the future.

=== Czech lore ===
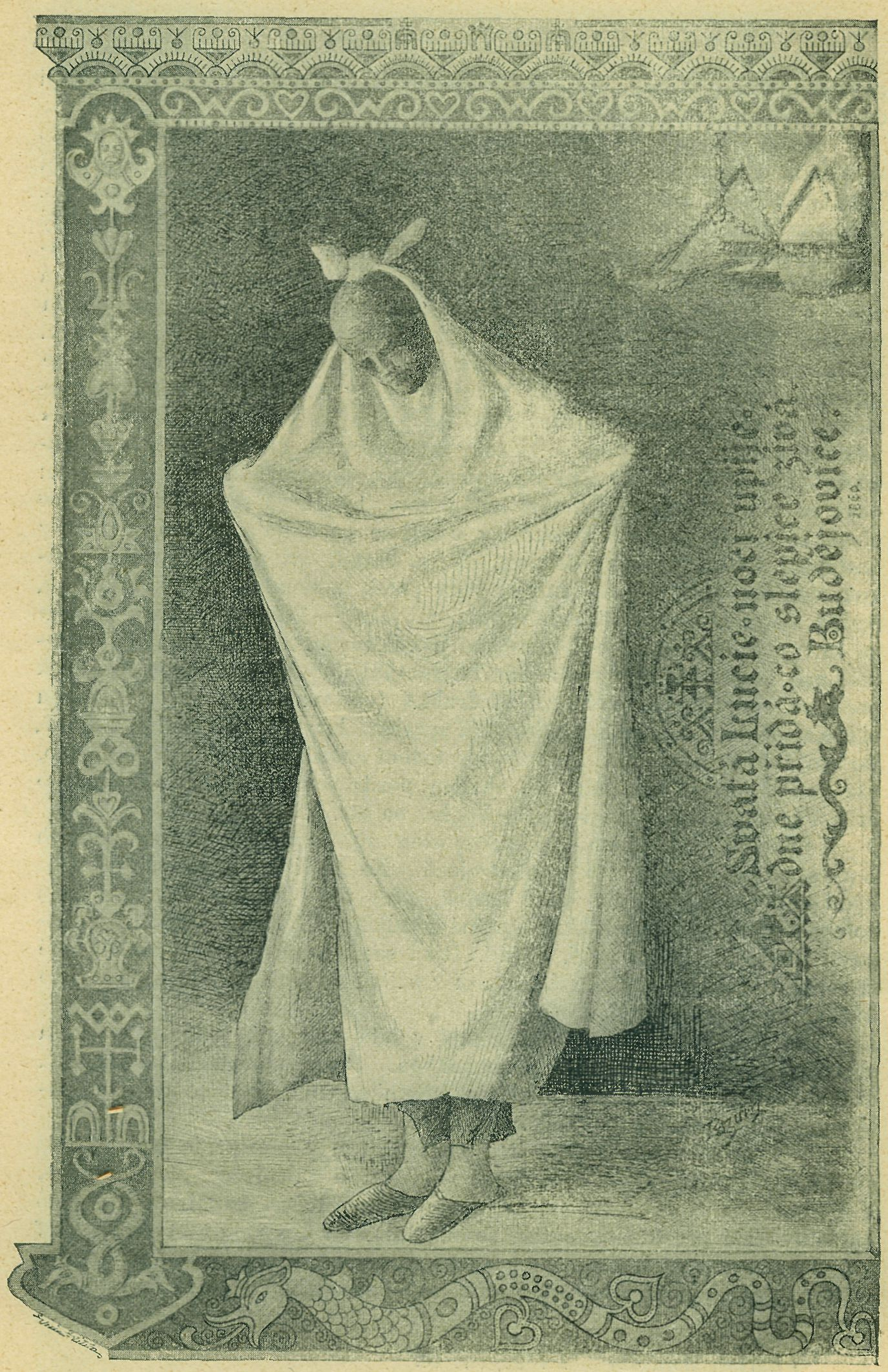
St. Lucie's costume, from South Bohemian Region. —Sketched by Karel Rozum

In Czechia, there is the lore in the Budějovický kraj (now Jihočeský kraj, South Bohemian Region, mostly in Bohemia) about the Laucj (or Lucka(u) or Lucij) who comes around door to door in a hideous dress, asking the housekeeper if her maidservants have "woven their tow?" (while shaking a cone of tow as if she were spinning it into thread). If the housekeeper answered no, she would whip the indolent spinstresses with a whip. (Note: Štěpán (1834), Č.Č.M. 8: 187, summarized by Máchal (1891).)

Around Bergreichenstein (Kašperské Hory) the name Lutzl is prevalent for the masked man who goes around threatening to slit the bellies of women, on St. Lucy's day. This often ends in a scuffle where the perpetrator gets unmasked.

Another variation (unspecified locale in the Bohemian Forest area, southwestern Czechia) is a costumed man armed with a long knife who visits houses on St. Lucia's day, asking if they have eaten the knödel, threatening anyone who replies no, though hardly anyone comes to harm since knödel is the standard fare everyone consumes during this time.

In Moravia also, a woman impersonating Luca walks around in white dress on St. Lucy's Day, wearing a mask with beetroots (řepový) (Note: Or rutabaga (kvakový) for teeth; she carries a ladle (vařecha) and beats inept spinstresses on the finger, while praising the skilled spinners after inspecting the yarn. (Note: Bartoš (1892), paraphrased in Zíbrt (1910), p. 68.)

In Hrozenkov, Moravia, a threesome of men in white clothes walk around on this day visiting homes: one with water and a bucket, the other with a broom, the third with a brush. One of them washes spoons and benches, another sweeps with a broom and third cleans the floor with his brush. (Note: Also paraphrased by Máchal (1891), but the citation is shifted and erroneously cites Bartoš (1891) Lid a národ 1: 111, which is tied to the correct lore in Zíbrt.)

=== German enclaves in Slavic nations ===
Among the German population in Weipert (Vejprty, Czechia), which is mining country located in the Ore Mountains, tradition called for "Luzi" figure carried a hedgehog skin, a needle, and a wooden spoon in the pre-Christmas season, together with the Schnappesel ("snapping donkey") enacted by men wearing donkey-heads with movable jaws.

In central Slovakia, a pair of Luzen figures went around homes, barging in on living rooms without knocking, according to the tradition the German populace were accustomed to in this region, particularly around Deutschproben (Nitrianske Pravno). One was clad in white, while the other had a blackened face and wore a Krampus-like costume. They carried goose feathers, doing some dusting or sweeping on the walls or corners, and perform a stomping dance, humming and grumbling, and leaving upon receiving a gift.

For the Germans living in the vicinity of Budweis (České Budějovice, South Bohemian Region), their Lucia worked in pairs with a Frau Holle and Perchta, and policed the spinning rooms (as Perchta was wont to do elsewhere), punishing spinstresses who worked on the St. Lucy's Day holiday.

In the Ascher Ländchen (Ašský výběžek, around Aš), the protestant Lutzer consisted of a girl-boy pair. The girl in white dress and wreathed on her head holds a lit candle, distributing gifts. The boy with soot-blackened face also puts on a mask, wears a fur coat inside-out and straws around his shins, carrying a broom and sack as instruments for punishing disobedient children. In protestant Pressburg (Bratislava, Slovakia) the Luzin was portrayed by youths or girls dressed in white and wearing veils; they would do sweeping chores on furniture and walls with goose feathers (cf. goose feathers above) in order to "sweep out misfortune". They distributed gifts of sweets or fruits, and rarely resorted to the wooden spoon (cf. ladle above) as means of corporal punishment.

=== Scandinavia ===
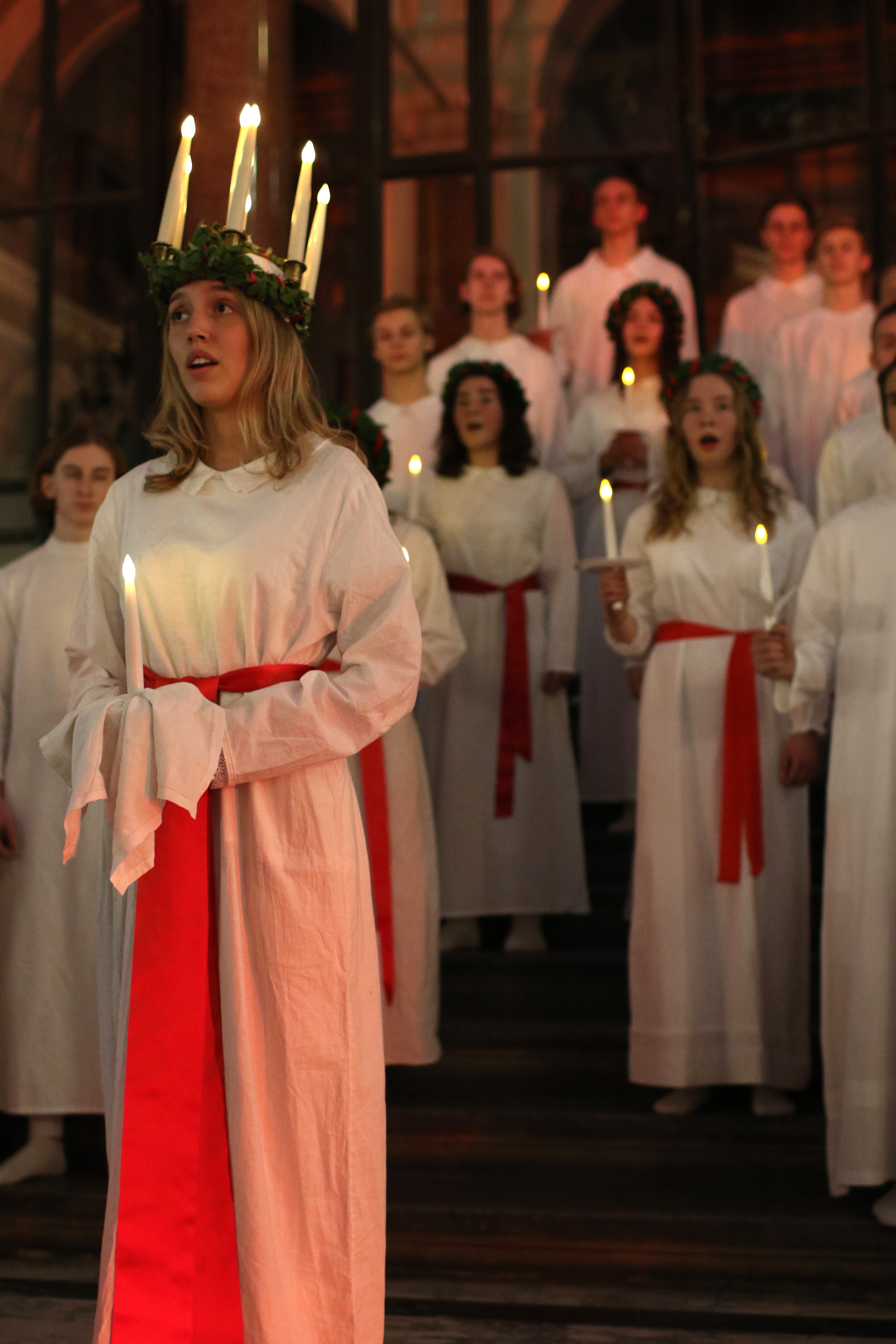
Swedish singer performing as Lucia. London 2016.

The lore or observance of the wandering Lucia spirit on St. Lucie's Day is not limited to eastern Central Europe, but extends to the north, to Scandinavia, particularly Sweden, and among Swedish Americans in the United States. The custom was similarly practiced in Norway, and from Sweden, also caught on in Denmark and Finland around post-World War II.

==== Sweden ====
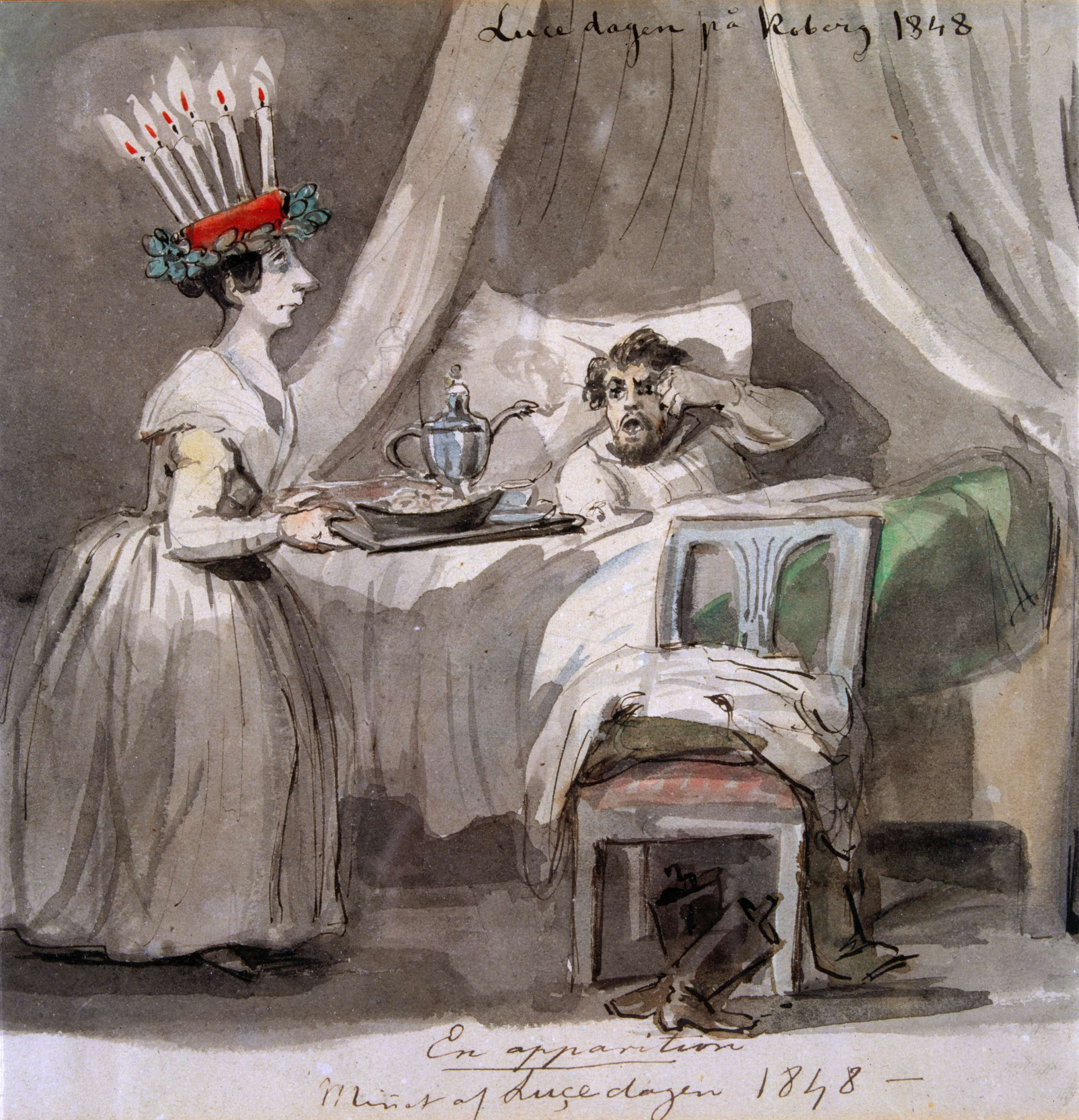
Lucia brings breakfast in bed. Koberg Castle in Västergötland. (Note: The artist was married to Baroness Augusta Charlotta Silfverschiöld, and often spent time at her parents' home.) —Watercolor by Fritz von Dardel (1848)

It is traditional for the designated Lucia (called Lucie, Lusse or Lussi) to dress in white, wearing a crown on her head set with lit candles, and typically decorated with lingonberry leaves or other greenery, (Note: The "whortleberry leaves" in one account is the general name for lingon and other related berries.) and a red sash around her waist (cf. photo right). The reason for the candles are obscure, though probably having to do with the association between her name Lucia and "light" (Latin: lux). She also traditionally carries a breakfast tray (explained further below).

The earliest recorded celebration of St. Lucia's Day in Sweden was in 1655. Under the old calendar, St. Lucia's Day coincided with winter solstice, but when Sweden's adoption of the Gregorian calendar in 1753 shifted the solstice to around December 22, St. Lucia's Day was still held fixed to be held on the 13th. The oldest record of a Lucia enactment arguably dates to 1764, in Västergötland, where a man states he was awoken in bed by the girls in white dress" a singing of a girl holding candles and wearing angel's wings, followed by a companion who brought foodstuff and drink set on a small table.

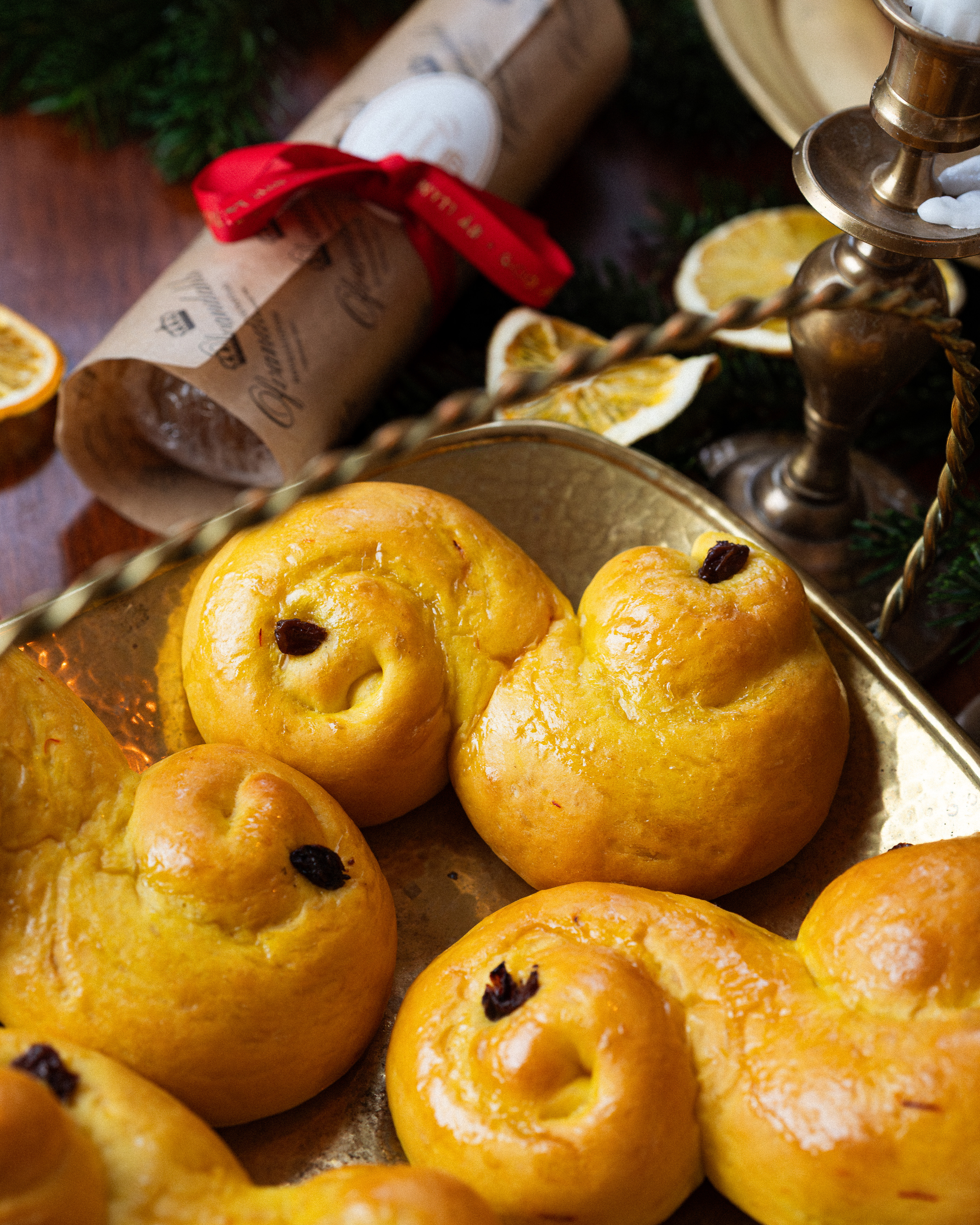
Lussekatter

The oldest picture of such Lucia, painted in 1848 by Fritz von Dardel, depicts the modern version with her wearing candles on her head and holding a breakfast tray (cf. image left). Rather than a full "breakfast in bed", it has been described as more of a "Lusse coffee" on a tray with candles, perhaps with a special "Lusse bun" baked specially for the occasion, but the coffee-serving was also purposed for the Lucia maid to go around and awake everyone (Note: Saying "Lucia invites you to breakfast") so they can gather for a grand breakfast feast at 3 or 4-o'-clock in the morning, featuring ham, brawn (head cheese), (Note: Cf. the description of Christmas fare after the slaughter: "..there were potato sausages, rolled headcheese, lingonberry relish, pickled herring, anchovies, and home-made cheese . And of course the 'julgröt'. This is a rich rice pudding all full of raisins and currants, with cinnamon sprinkled over the top". The julgröt (lit. 'Yule porridge') is probably more closely associated with the tomte than with Lucia.) and black pudding, since by custom, the winter slaughter was to be completed for this day. Of course whatever was eaten for the Lussebit depended on the affluence of the household, perhaps just bread, or even mere crumbs. The foregoing Lusse's buns are identified in later literature as Lusse-katter (lit. 'Lucia cats', cf. image lower right), and explained as saffroned buns. The Lucia girl would sing a particular song, the Lussibrud (lit. 'Lucia bride') to waken her charge.

The Lucia/Lusse roles were assigned to maidservants in families who could afford to hire them, but the practice at one time seems to have been going out of fashion, around the early 20th century or even earlier. (Note: The testimony of Wikström hails back to the 1840s when her father lived through the tradition. Likewise, Baron Joachim Beck-Friis (1861–1939) states his own family never celebrated Lucia during his lifetime, but his mother (in her youth) back in Björneborg in Värmland was forced to play the unwanted role of "wear[ing] the crown of dripping tallow candles in her hair.) (Note: Sundblad (1917) is also source recollecting the "old days".) (Note: Miles (1913) also couches his description in the past tense: "In Sweden St. Lucia's Day was formerly marked by some interesting practices".) The celebration of Lucia gained a new lease on life after a newspaper sponsored running a Miss Lucia contest for Stockholm starting 1927. (Note: Peebles (2006), p. 109 and p. 115 paraphrasing (in Swedish) info from Skansen website (2006b)) (Note: Cf. Melotti (2025))

== Origin explanations ==
One standard explanation is that Lutzel was the deliberate substitution of the pagan Perchta figure, orchestrated by the Church; or to put it another way, St. Lucia's Day was the Christianization of Perchta rituals in German-speaking areas.

A somewhat different explanation is given for protestant Lutheran Sweden. Since the protestant reformation frowned upon the veneration of Catholic saints, it became necessary to substitute the Christmas gift-bringer St. Nicholas with the Christkind, whose tradition as once celebrated more widely in Germany (and still preserved in Nuremberg), and closely parallels the Lucie/Lussi tradition of modern Sweden, It is thus conjectured that the latter developed from the transmission of the lore from northern Germany, initially to western Sweden.

== See also ==
- Drude - a nightmare variant invoked in prayer described above; also compare "Drude's Cross" with Luzienkreuz
- Krampus – Christmas figure in Alpine folklore
- Perchta - Similar German, Bohemian, etc. tradition, during Twelve Days of Christmas.
- Ushi no toki mairi - late hour cursing involving the cursor wearing a crown (of inverted tripod) set with burning candles
