= Fastnacht (Pennsylvania Dutch) =

Holiday on Shrove Tuesday

Fastnacht Day
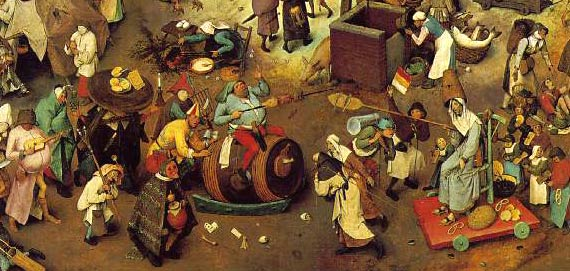
- Pieter Bruegel the Elder: The Fight Between Carnival and Lent, 1559
- Observed by: Followers of many Christian denominations and common custom
- Type: Christian
- Date: Tuesday in seventh week before Easter
- 2025 date: March 4
- 2026 date: February 17
- 2027 date: February 9
- 2028 date: February 29
- Related to: Ash Wednesday; Mardi Gras

Fastnacht Day (also spelled Fasnacht, or in Pennsylvania German: Faasenacht) is an annual Pennsylvania Dutch celebration that falls on Shrove Tuesday, the day before Ash Wednesday. The word translates to "the eve of the fast." The tradition is to eat the very best foods, which are part of the German tradition, and much of them, before the Lenten fast.

A type of doughnut, named Fasnacht after the holiday itself, is often prepared during this time.

== History ==
In Catholic and Protestant countries, Fastnacht Day is also called "Fat Tuesday," or "Mardi Gras," a name which predates the Reformation and referred to the Christian tradition of eating rich foods before the Lenten fast began. In some South American countries, the day is associated with Carnival, a festival of dancing, drinking and debauchery. "Carnival," which is the English spelling, derives from the words "carne levar," or "meat takeaway," another Lenten tradition. Fastnacht can also be spelled as "fasnacht", "fassenacht," or "faschnacht."

== Traditional celebrations ==
Since Pennsylvania Dutch farm families were quite large, when the "Haus Frau" (housewife) began to fry fastnachts in her warm kitchen, the tantalizing smell of these raised donut-like cakes lingered throughout the farmhouse, encouraging family members to wake up and come to breakfast. The last person up on Shrove Tuesday was called the "Fastnacht" and teased all day for being late for breakfast. In the same way, the last person up on Ash Wednesday was also teased and called the "Ashepuddle." This person's chore for the day was to carry the ashes in the stoves and ovens outside to the ash pile.

Older Church congregations in the East Penn Valley still have Fastnacht Church Socials or suppers in which the community gathers for fellowship, celebrating their Pennsylvania Dutch heritage.

== Date ==
Fastnacht dates:

- February 17, 2026
- February 9, 2027
- February 29, 2028
- February 13, 2029

== See also ==
- Swabian-Alemannic Fastnacht
- Nuremberg Shrovetide Carnival
