= Schembart Carnival =

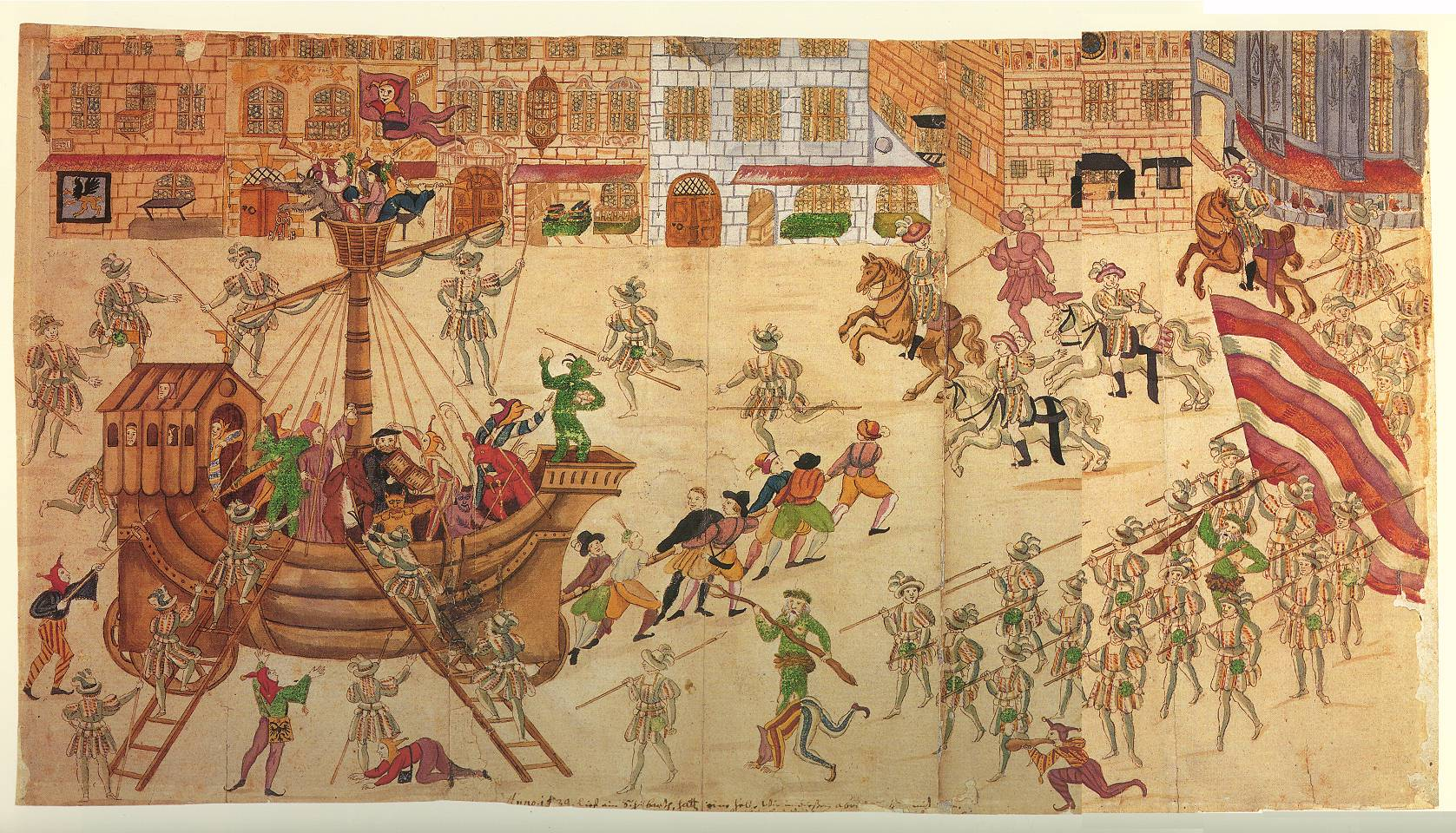
Schembartlauf in Nuremberg

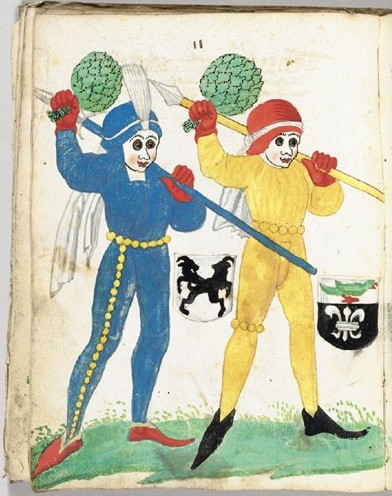
Schembartlauf costumes

The Schembart Carnival or Nuremberg Shrovetide Carnival (German: Schembartlauf, from Schembart (lit. 'bearded mask', Middle High German: schëme, schëm 'mask' and Lauf, 'run, running') was popular in Nuremberg, Germany in the 15th century before it ended in 1539. The carnival featured costumed men with masks carved of wood, carrying on and generally acting foolishly.

Along with music, song, food and drink, the carnival featured speakers who poked fun at politicians, persons of power, and policies of the government.

A ban on the Schembartlauf was imposed by the Council (Rat) of Nuremberg in 1539 after the Läufer engaged in satire of a preacher named Dr. Osiander. The carnival was revived in 1974.

Details about the Schembart Carnival are known from about more than 80 (Note: Sumberg (1941), p. 5 counts 50 mss.) Schembartbooks (Schembartbücher, singular: Schembartbuch). These manuscripts describe chronologically and richly illustrate the Nuremberg Schembartlauf events of 1449 to 1539. Written from the late 16th century until the 19th century, these books are quite similar to each other and mostly have colored drawings of the costumed men and of festivities of each year, and also list the names of participants, descriptions of masks, and a recording of the better carnival events. 35 originals are located in Nuremberg libraries, most of them in the Germanisches Nationalmuseum Nuremberg, and about 30 more are in other German cities. Some books reside abroad.

Since the 17th century sporadic performances are reported, but only starting in 1974, the Nuremberg "Schembart Gesellschaft" performs the event regularly, although not every year.

== See also ==
- Fastnacht
- Fastnacht (Pennsylvania Dutch)
- Carnival in Germany, Switzerland and Austria
