= Frau-Holle-Teich =

Lake in Hesse, Germany

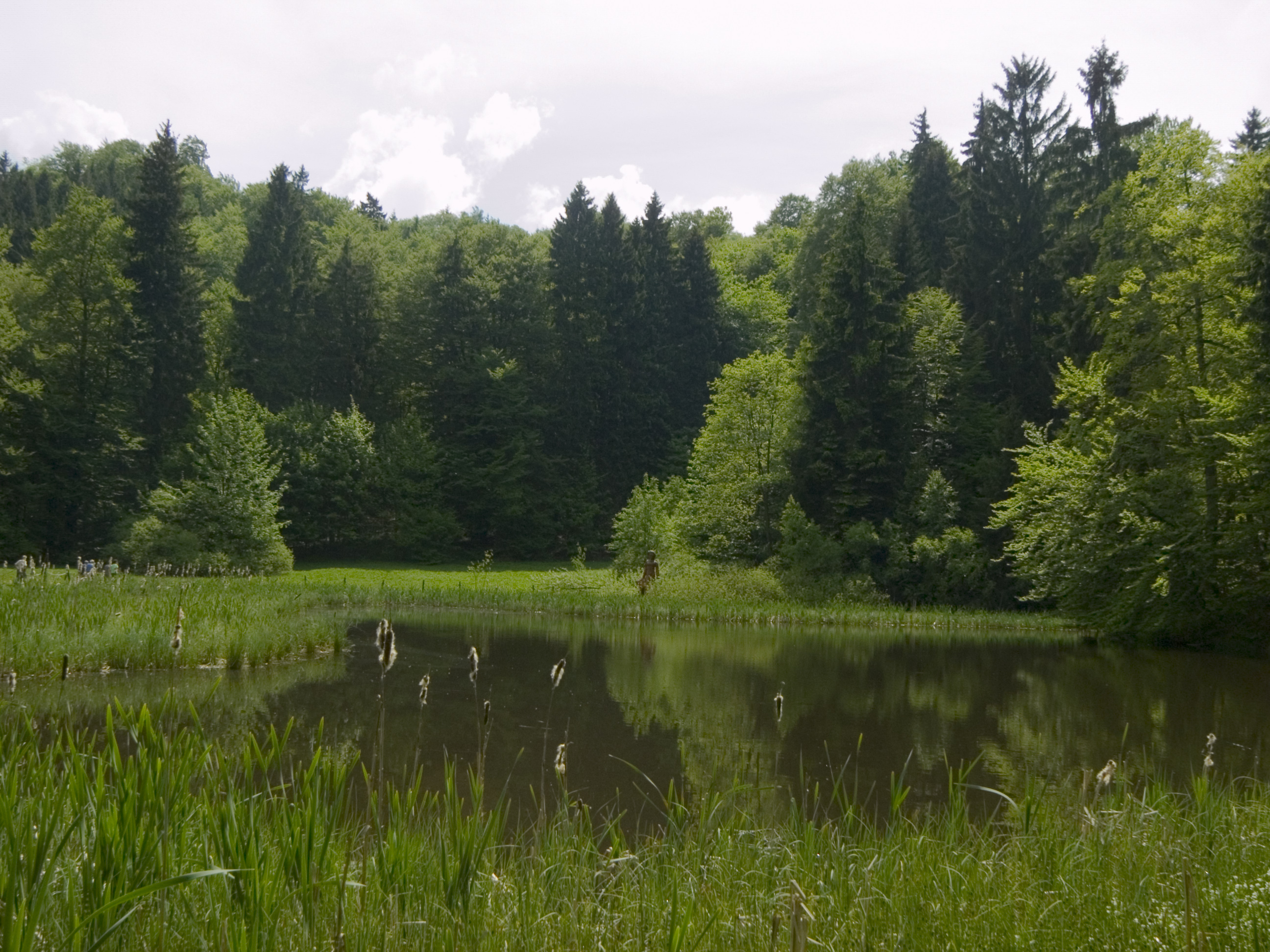

- Location within Hesse
- Location: Hoher Meißner, Werra-Meißner-Kreis, Hesse
- Coordinates: 51°13′8″N 9°52′11″E
- Primary inflows: Godesborn-Quelle, Ziegenbach
- Primary outflows: Hollenbach
- Basin countries: Germany
- Max. depth: 2.60 m (8 ft 6 in)
- Surface elevation: ca. 623 m (2,044 ft)

Frau-Holle-Teich is a pond in Hoher Meißner, Werra-Meißner-Kreis, Hesse, Germany. The pond lies at an elevation of ca. 623 m.
