= Ludwig Pietsch =

German painter

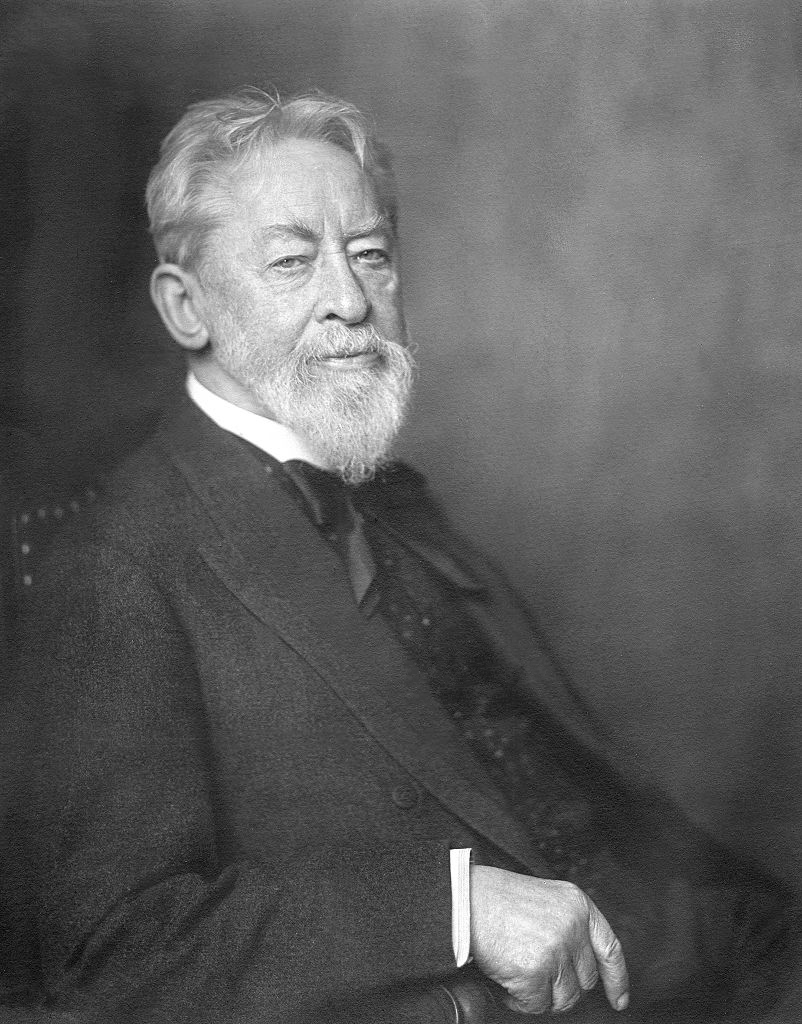
Ludwig Pietsch by Nicola Perscheid

Ludwig Pietsch (25 December 1824 – 27 November 1911) was a German painter, art critic and feature writer and a friend of Theodor Fontane.

== Life ==
Pietsch attended the Danzig art and vocational school, and in 1841–1843 the Berlin Art Academy; he also studied under Swiss painter Charles Gleyre in Paris. He worked as an illustrator for various newspapers and journals, including the well-known Leipzig Illustrirte Zeitung. His articles in the Vossische Zeitung and the Haude- und Spenersche Zeitung started to appear in 1864, and he later contributed to the Breslau Schlesische Zeitung where he served as a chief feature writer for a period, as well as the periodical Grenzboten, published by Gustav Freytag and Julian Schmidt and the Berliner Allgemeine Zeitung. He reported on Berlin's social events such as the annual Presseball, and was its most important and gifted fashion critic, much to his own embarrassment. He also reported on his own travel experiences, art and handicraft exhibitions, and served as a companion to the Crown Prince Frederich in the Franco-German war of 1871. His autobiography "Wie ich Schriftsteller geworden bin. Der wunderliche Roman meines Lebens" (How I Became a Writer. The whimsical novel of my life) which is mainly dedicated to the years 1849 to 1866, was first published at the end of the 19th century. The book provides a good and entertaining insight into Germany's imperial period, the beginning nationalism and, above all, the Berlin artistic scene of the time.

He was given an honorary title of Professor for his 70th birthday.

Pietsch was reputed to be a tireless socialite well into his old age. He associated daily with actors, artists and politicians, and had an intimate knowledge of Berlin's social scene, cafes, restaurants and balls, and was much admired by his female readers. Pietsch harnessed his Christmas Eve birthday to celebrate the whole day, starting at midnight. Alfred Kerr wrote of Pietsch:

He is a daredevil, shrugging off his seventy years, and draws in all the joie de vivre to live life to the full. He has hardly given up hope for women, and he is even dangerous in their presence. He appears at every notables' banquet, every premiere, and at the opening of every show.

Walther Kiaulehn recalls similarly:

Pietsch was a talented painter who withdrew from his easel with his imperious talents into society. He was the confidant of houses where art was loved. Humorous and gallant, he chatted about everything having to do with old families and new images, exhibitions, on the dresses of the ladies, suppers, and studio visits.

The most important of Pietsch's close acquaintances were labor leader Ferdinand Lassalle, the sculptor Reinhold Begas, the painter Adolph Menzel and the writers Theodor Storm and Ivan Turgenev. With the latter, Pietsch was in particularly close contact, both in Berlin and in Baden Baden.

== Selected works ==
- Aus Welt und Kunst : Studien und Bilder. Jena : Costenoble, 1867 (2 volumes)
- Von Berlin bis Paris. Kriegsbilder (1870–1871). Berlin 1871
- Nach Athen und Byzanz. Ein Frühlingsausflug. Berlin: Janke 1871
- Orientfahrten eines Berliner Zeichners. Berlin: Janke 1871
- Marokko. Briefe von der deutschen Gesandtschaftsreise nach Fez im Frühjahr 1877. Leipzig: Brockhaus 1878
- Wallfahrt nach Olympia im ersten Frühling der Ausgrabungen (April und Mai 1876) nebst einem Bericht über die Resultate der beiden folgenden Ausgrabungs-Campagnen. Reisebriefe. Berlin: Luckhardt 1879
- Andreas Achenbach. Breslau 1880
- Paul Meyerheim. Breslau 1881
- Die deutsche Malerei der Gegenwart auf der Jubiläums-Ausstellung der Königlichen Akademie der Künste zu Berlin 1886. München: Hanfstaengel 1886
- Die Malerei auf der Münchener Jubiläums-Kunst-Ausstellung 1888. München: Hanfstaengel 1888–1889
- Ludwig Pietsch: Wie ich Schriftsteller geworden bin. Der wunderliche Roman meines Lebens.
  - Volume 1: Erinnerungen aus den Fünfziger Jahren. Berlin: Fontane 1893.
  - Volume 2: Erinnerungen aus den Sechziger Jahren. Berlin: Fontane 1894.
  - Newly edited by Peter Goldammer, Berlin: Aufbau-Verlag 2000. ISBN 3-351-02875-X
- Aus jungen und alten Tagen. Memoirs. Berlin : Fontane 1904

== Bibliography ==
- Ludwig Pietsch on his 80th Birthday, 25. Dezember 1904. Berlin: von Holten 1909
- Letters of a friendship: Correspondence between Ludwig Pietsch and Theodor Storm. Assembled by Volquart Pauls. Heide: Boyens 1939
- Ivan Turgenev to Ludwig Pietsch. Correspondence from 1864–1883. Edited by Alfred Doren. With illustrations by Ludwig Pietsch. Berlin: Propyläen-Verlag 1923
- Der Große Brockhaus, 15th printing, 1933, Volume 14, p. 564.
