= Ludwig Bechstein =

German writer and fairy tale collector (1801–1860)

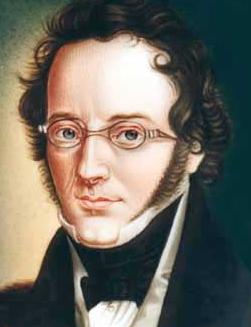
Ludwig Bechstein

Ludwig Bechstein (German pronunciation: [ˈluːtvɪç ˈbɛçʃtaɪn]; 24 November 1801 – 14 May 1860) was a German writer and collector of folk fairy tales.

He was born in Weimar, the illegitimate child of Johanna Carolina Dorothea Bechstein and Hubert Dupontreau, a French emigrant who disappeared before the birth of the child; Ludwig thus grew up very poor in his first nine years. His situation improved only when his uncle Johann Matthäus Bechstein, a renowned naturalist and forester living in Meiningen in the country of Duchy of Saxe-Meiningen, adopted him in 1810. He was sent to school in Meiningen, and in 1818, started an apprenticeship as a pharmacist.

From 1828 to 1831 he studied philosophy and literature in Leipzig and Munich thanks to a stipend granted by Duke Bernhard II of Sachsen-Meiningen, who hired him subsequently as a librarian. This lifetime post provided Bechstein with a continuous income, while leaving him a lot of freedom to pursue his own interests and writing. He lived from 1831 until his death in Meiningen. In his honor, a fountain was built in the English Garden.

Bechstein published many works and was a successful author of his time. His German Fairy Tale Book was even more popular than the Brothers Grimm's collection when it was first published in 1845. He published several collections of folk tales, and also published romances and poems

== Important works ==
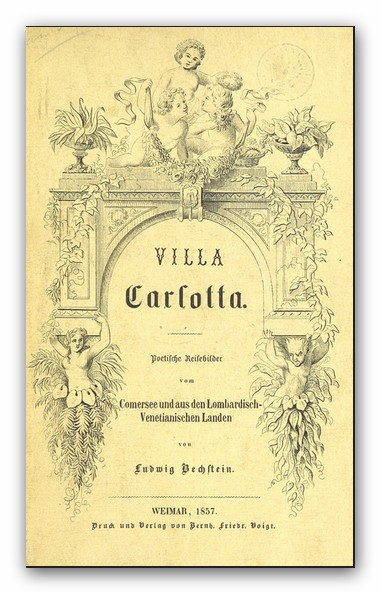
Cover of Villa Carlotta. Poetic Travel Images from Lake Como and the Lombard-Venetian lands (Villa Carlotta. Poetische Reisebilder vom Comersee und aus den lombardisch-venetianischen Landen), by Bechstein (1857)

- (Thuringian Folktales) Thüringische Volksmärchen (1823)
- Sonnet Wreaths (Sonettenkränze) (1826, through which Duke Bernhard became interested in him)
- The Children of Haymon (1830, epic poem)
- The Dance of Death (Der Totentanz) (1831, epic poem)
- Grimmenthal (1833, novel)
- Luther (1834)
- A Treasury of the Tales of Thuringian Legends and Legend Cycles, (1835–38) (Der Sagenschatz und die Sagenkreise des Thüringerlandes)
- Journeys of a Musician, 1836–37, novel, (Fahrten eines Musikanten)
- German Fairy-Tale Book, 1845; 41st ed., 1893, (Deutsches Märchenbuch); French translation with introduction and comments: Corinne and Claude Lecouteux, Paris, José Corti, 2010 (collection Merveilleux); English (complete) translation: Michael Haldane (see External Links)
- New Natural History of Pet Birds (1846, humorous didactic poem)
- Berthold the Student, 1850, novel, (Berthold der Student)
- Folktales (1823) (Volksmärchen)
  - German Legend Book of Folktales, 1853, (Deutsches Sagenbuch Volksmärchen)
- New German Fairy-Tale Book, 1856; 105th ed., 1922); English (complete) translated: Michael Haldane (Neues Deutsches Märchenbuch) (see External Links)
- Thuringian Legend Book (Thüringer Sagenbuch) (1858)
- Thuringia's Royal House (1865)

== Schools named after Ludwig Bechstein ==
- Staatliche Grundschule 6, Erfurt: Bechsteinschule (public elementary school)
- Ludwig-Bechstein-Grundschule, Meiningen: (public elementary school)
