= Egil One-Hand =

Fictional character

Egil One-Hand is a berserker hero from the Icelandic legendary saga Egils saga einhenda ok Ásmundar berserkjabana.

== Life ==
Egil was the son of Hring ruler of Småland and Ingibjorg, daughter of Earl Bjarkmar of Gautland. Egil was a troublesome young boy who would often go with a gang of his friends into the woods and kill birds and animals for sport.

At the age of twelve, Egil and all his friends had a competition to see who could swim across a large lake near his home. Egil quickly out-swam everyone else and found himself lost in a thick fog. He wandered around the water for a few days until finally coming to shore, where he promptly fell asleep from exhaustion. When he awoke, he was met by a giant, who forced Egil to tend after his many difficult goats, should Egil ever fail in his tending, the giant promised to kill him.

After a year of this, Egil attempted to escape, but was caught by the giant within four days. The giant, upset at Egil's escape attempt, placed two iron clamps, each with 40-pound weights on them, on Egil's feet. Egil had to carry the load with him wherever he went for the next seven years.

Once when Egil was out late searching for a goat who had run off, he found a cat and captured it. When Egil returned to the giant's cave, the giant asked him how he was able to see in the dark. Egil explained he had special golden eyes, when the giant inquired more about these eyes, Egil flashed the eyes of the cat in the giant's face. The giant wanted them badly and agreed to an exchange of Egil's freedom for the Golden Eyes. In order to complete his escape, Egil tied the giant to a column and messed with giant's eyes. He then told the giant he had made a mistake and dropped the golden eyes into the fire. The giant became very upset and ran to the door of the cave where he locked it and set up guard in front of it. Egil, after some days of debating, took a goat and killed it and sewed its fur into his body so the giant thought he was a goat. He then caused a stampede towards the door and tried to slip out with the other goats. The giant, however, could tell that Goat-Egils' hooves were not clicking and grabbed him, he tried to kill Egil but missed because of his poor vision and cut off Egils' ear instead. Egil responded by cutting off the giant's right hand and stealing a valuable ring from him, and finally escaping the giant.

After spending some time free in the wilderness, Egil came across Viking ships, under the command of a man named Borgar. Egil joined their crew, until one day, when a named Glammad fought Borgar, in the ensuing battle, both men perished and Egil took over as leader of both Viking companies. Handpicking the 32 best Beserkers, he went on his way plundering and pillaging the Baltics.

While plundering, Egil saw battle on an island between a giantess with a very short skirt, and a different giant, who were fighting over a ring. Egil went to assist the giantess, and cut off a large portion of the giant's biceps. The giant then cut off Egil's arm and Egil retreated to his men and ships, where they set sail immediately. A few days later at port, Egil was unable to sleep because of the pain from his stubbed arm. He went for a walk in the forest, where he came across a dwarf child getting water. Egil took one of his gold rings and let it secretly fall into the child's pail. Later on, an adult dwarf came from the rock, and wanted to know who had done this kindness for the child, Egil explained that he had done it, for gold was of little use to him in his agony. The dwarf then took Egil aside and dressed his wound until it no longer hurt and indeed seemed healed. Then the dwarf fitted a sword into Egils' arm so deeply that it went to his elbow, allowing Egil to strike easily with it, as if he still had the arm he had lost in combat.

At some later point, Egil and his men traveled to the Kingdom of Russia ruled by King Hertygg, where they began plundering and laying waste to it. Rognvald, the warrior tasked with defending Russia attempted to fight and stop Egil. Despite Rognvald having three times as many warriors as Egil, the battle was an embarrassing loss, as he lost all his men except for a handful. Rognavald was also mortally wounded himself, having only enough strength left to report what had happened to the king.

Asmund Berserkers-Slayer, who was with the king when Rognvald reported of the battle, then offered to go meet Egil and avenge Rognvald, the king agreed and Asmund set off. Once Asmund met Egil, Asmund and Egil decided it would be better not to waste so much life and for them to have a one-on-one duel, and so three times they dueled, each time ending in an exhausted draw. However, in the final duel, Asmund gained the upper hand and was able to force Egil to surrender. Afterwards, Egil pledged his loyalty to King Hertrygg.

Not long after, Asmund and Egil decide to go search for the king's missing daughter, and the two set out on a voyage to find her.

== Sources ==
- Pålsson, Hermann; Edwards, Paul (1985). Seven Viking Romances. London: Penguin Books. ISBN 0-14-044474-2.
