= Hálfdanar saga Eysteinssonar =

Icelandic legendary saga

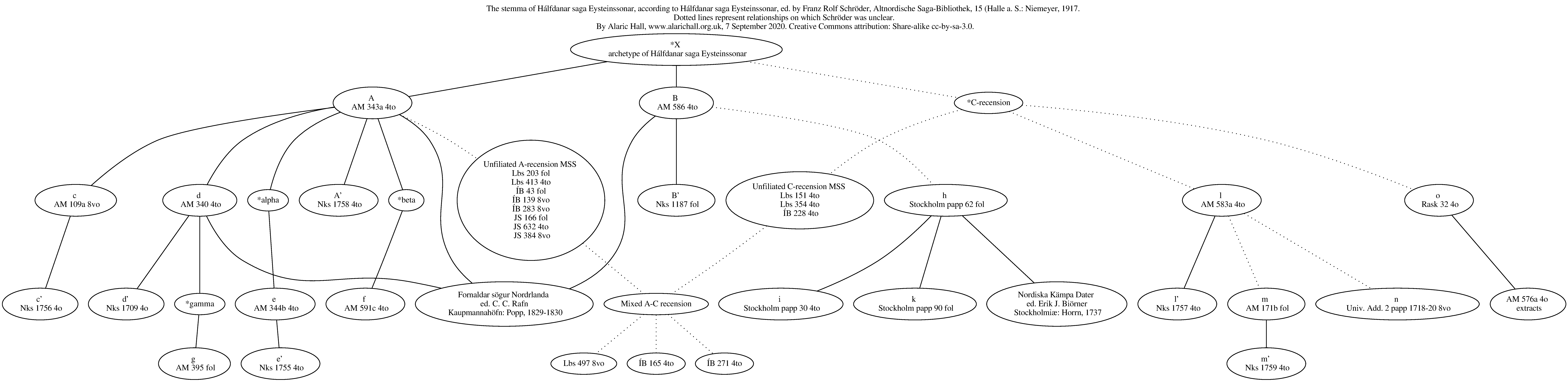
Stemma of the manuscripts of Hálfdanar saga Eysteinssonar, after Franz Rolf Schröder. Dotted lines represent relationships on which Schröder was unclear.

Hálfdanar saga Eysteinssonar is a legendary saga from early 14th century Iceland about Halfdan Eysteinsson. The main events appear to take place in the 9th century.

Halfdan's grandfather was Þrándr, the eponymous king of Trondheim, who in turn was the son of Sæmingr, king of Hålogaland and son of Odin. Sæmingr had married Nauma who had given her name to Namdalen. Þrándr had married Dagmær, the sister of Svanhvít, the heroine of Hrómundar saga Gripssonar, and they had had the sons Eysteinn and Eirikr inn víðförli. Eirikr is the hero of Eireks saga víðförla and discovered Ódáinsakr. Eysteinn married Ása, the daughter of Sigurd Hart, and Áslaug, the daughter of Sigurd Snake-in-the-Eye. They had several sons, of whom Halfdan was one.

It deals with Eysteinn's adventures in Staraja Ladoga (Aldeigjuborg), his conquest of Alaborg, and the adventures of his son Halfdan.

== Editions ==
- Biörner, Erik J., ed. Nordiska Kämpa Dater. Stockholmiæ: Horrn, 1737.
- Bjarni Vilhjálmsson and Guðni Jónsson, eds. Fornaldarsögur Norðurlanda. Reykjavík, 1943–1944, vol. 3, 283–319.
- Glazyrína, Galína, ed. Íslandskíje víkíngskíje sagí o severnoj Rúsí: Teksty, perevod, kommentaríj. Moskva, 1996, 47–115.
- Guðni Jónsson, ed. Fornaldar sögur Norðurlanda. Reykjavík: Íslendingasagnaútgáfan, 1954–1959, vol. 4, 245–285.
- Rafn, C[arl] C[hristian], ed. Fornaldar sögur Nordrlanda. Kaupmannahöfn: Popp, 1829–1830, vol. 3, 519–558. [Primary manuscript: AM 343 a 4to. Variants from: AM 586 4to, AM 340 4to.]
- Schröder, Franz Rolf, ed. Hálfdanar saga Eysteinssonar. Altnordische Saga-Bibliothek 15. Halle a. S.: Niemeyer, 1917.
- Valdimar Ásmundarson, ed. Fornaldarsögur Norðrlanda. 2nd edition. Reykjavík: Sigurður Kristjánsson, 1891, vol. 3, 399–431. [First ed. Reykjavík, 1885-1891]

== Translations ==
- Biörner, Erik J., trans. Nordiska Kämpa Dater. Stockholmiæ: Horrn, 1737. [separately paginated] [Swedish and Latin]
- Glazyrína, Galína, trans. Íslandskíje víkíngskíje sagí o severnoj Rúsí: Teksty, perevod, kommentaríj. Moskva, 1996, 47–115, 47–115. [Russian] Сага о Хальвдане Эйстейнссоне (link to Russian translation)
- Hardman, George L., trans. "The Saga of Halfdan Eysteinsson". Accessed 17 January 2014. [English]
- Hermann Pálsson and Paul Edwards, trans. Seven Viking Romances. Harmondsworth: Penguin, 1985, 171–198. [English] (Reprinted in Hermann Pálsson and Paul Edwards, trans. Two Viking Romances. New York: Penguin, 1995.
- Ibáñez Lluch, Santiago, trans. La Saga de Yngvar el Viajero y otras sagas legendarias de Islandia. Madrid: Miraguano, 2011, 235–295. [Spanish]
- Nilssen, Kjell Tore, and Árni Ólafsson, trans. "Halfdan Eysteinssons saga". Published 2014. [Norwegian-Bokmål]
- Simek, Rudolf, trans. Zwei Abenteuersagas. Altnordische Bibliothek 7. Leverkusen: Literaturverlag Norden, 1989, 55–99. [German]
- Starý, Jiří, Lucie Korecká, Ondřej Himmer, Marie Novotná, Markéta Podolská, Kateřina Ratajová, David Šimeček, and Pavel Vondřička, trans. Lživé ságy starého severu. Praha: Herrmann & synové, 2015, 165–192. [Czech]
