= Guðmundr =

Semi-Legendary Norse king

Guðmundr (Old Norse: [ˈɡuðˌmundz̠], sometimes anglicised as Godmund) was a semi-legendary Norse king in Jotunheim, ruling over a land called Glæsisvellir, which was known as the warrior's paradise.

Guðmundr appears in the following legendary sagas:

- Bósa saga ok Herrauðs
- Helga þáttr Þórissonar
- Hervarar saga ok Heiðreks
- Norna-Gests þáttr
- Þorsteins þáttr bæjarmagns

He also appears in Saxo Grammaticus' Gesta Danorum (Book VIII) and in Samsons saga fagra, one of the chivalric sagas.

Guðmundr shared the same name with his father; Úlfhéðinn was added to the son's name to differentiate father from son. According to some sources, Guðmundr Úlfhéðinn's son was Heiðrekr Úlfhamr. However, in Hervarar saga ok Heiðreks Guðmundr's son was Höfund, who married Hervor, and their sons were Angantýr and Heiðrekr. Saxo Grammaticus, in Gesta Danorum (VIII), referred to Guðmundr Ulfheðinn as Guthmundus, calling him a giant and the brother of Geruthus (Geirröðr).

He is sometimes given the epithet faxi, 'the one with a mane', i.e., a horse. This suggests a connection with the army of the dead who roam Norway at Yule, the Oskorei. Otto Höfler, drawing on earlier theories of Nils Lid, argued that it was actually a word found in modern Norwegian dialect as both fax and faxe and referring to a kind of grass, and that it referred to the fertility symbol of the sheaf in Norwegian Yule celebrations. According to Hervarar saga ok Heiðreks, the Norwegians came to see Guðmundr as a god; Höfler argued that in both the wolf-form suggested by Úlfhéðinn and the horse-form suggested by faxi, Guðmundr was a death-demon and his death-horse the prototype of the death-horse Sleipnir portrayed on the Gotland picture stones.

Ingemar Nordgren regards the first Guðmundr as "a cult-god" and his son, the Guðmundr of the sagas, as portraying him in theriomorphic form, and suggests that he is either an earlier fertility god who came to be identified with Óðinn and that Glæsisvellir was influenced by Valhalla, or that he is a local variant of a precursor of Óðinn.

Guðmundr and the Lombards are said to have battled Helgi and Sinfjötli; it is Guðmundr who engages in the flyting with Sinfjötli from shore in Helgakviða Hundingsbana I. The latter are called the Ylfings, the 'wolf clan'. As Höfler noted, both armies are spoken of as animals, and Paulus Diaconus identifies the Lombards with mares with white bands around their legs symbolising fetters (they did in fact bind their legs with white bands). Since Óðinn is patron of the Lombards, this is another Odinic connection.

Einar Ólafur Sveinsson thought Guðmundr was Irish in origin while Geirröðr was native Scandinavian.
