= Þiðreks saga =

Old Norse chivalric saga

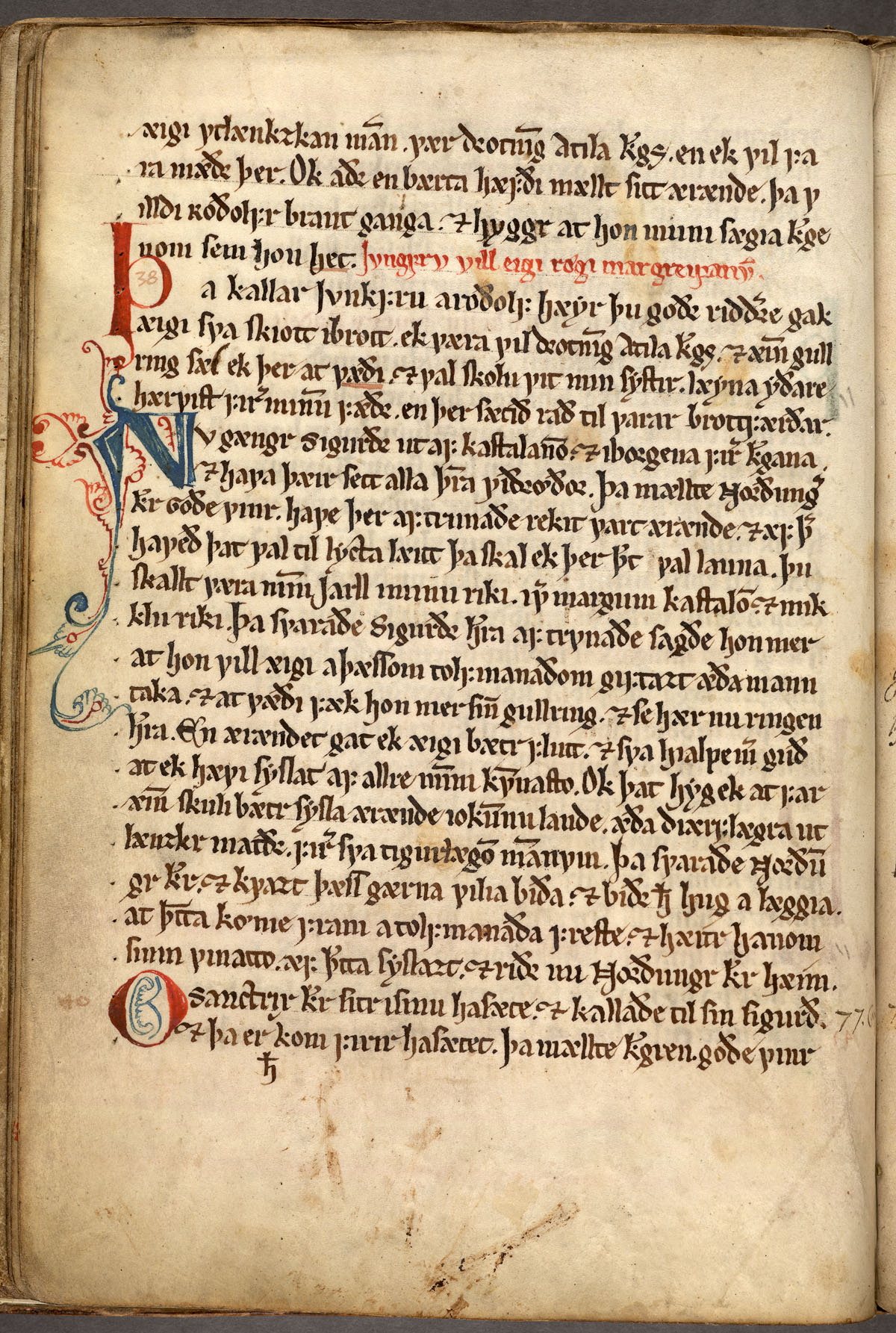
Thidrekssaga, Royal Library, Stockholm perg. fol. 4, bl. 11v.

Þiðreks saga af Bern ('the saga of Þiðrekr of Bern', sometimes Thidrekssaga or Thidreks saga in English) is an Old Norse saga that collects almost all Germanic heroic legends known from Germany into a single narrative. At the center of this narrative is the biography of the hero Dietrich von Bern (Old Norse: Þiðrekr af Bern).

Most scholars believe that the saga was probably composed in Bergen, Norway, at the court of king Haakon IV, sometime around 1250. Scholars are divided between those that believe that the composer translated a lost Low German original ("translation hypothesis") and those who believe that the sources were mostly oral and conveyed to Norway by merchants of the Hanseatic League, only being joined in Norway ("compilation hypothesis"). The saga contains a number of otherwise unknown German legends. Controversy exists as to whether to consider the Þiðreks saga af Bern a courtly chivalric saga, like Haakon's other translation projects, or a legendary saga given that it contains Germanic heroic legends.

In addition to the Old Norse version, an adaptation into Old Swedish known as the Didriks Krönika was created in the mid 15th century. It is not a literal translation but an adaptation that would go on to influence further Scandinavian texts about Dietrich and the Nibelungen.

== Summary ==
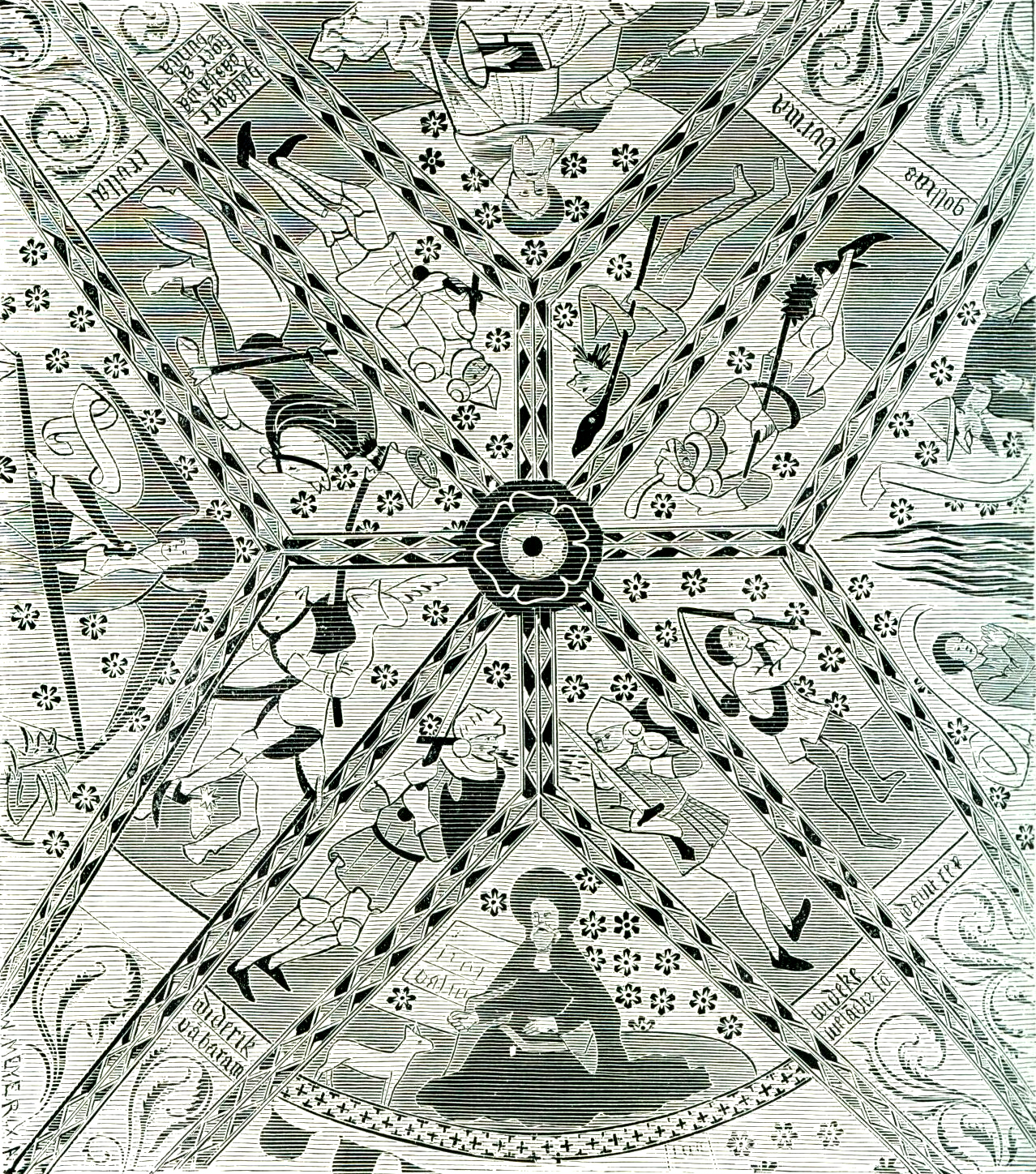
Fresco by Albertus Pictor of eight mostly biblical heroes, but including Dietrich von Bern fighting against Witege from the Old Swedish version of the Þiðreks saga, found on the vault of Floda church in Södermanland, Sweden, painted around 1479. Dietrich is breathing fire and is found in the lower part of the image.

The Þiðreks saga is a compilation of legends about almost all known heroes from continental Germanic heroic legend into a single text; it also includes other narratives that were closely associated with such legends. Some of the legends have no extant German counterpart. It also contains material from fairy tales, folktales, and Spielmannsdichtung. At the centre of Þiðreks saga is a complete life of Dietrich von Bern (Old Norse: Þiðrekr of Bern).

It begins by telling of Þiðrekr's grandfather and father, and then tells of Þiðrekr's youth at his father's court, where Hildebrand tutors him and he accomplishes his first heroic deeds. After his father's death, Þiðrekr leads several military campaigns: then he is exiled from his kingdom by his uncle Ermenrik, fleeing to Attila's court. There is an unsuccessful attempt to return to his kingdom, during which Attila's sons and Þiðrekr's brother die. This is followed by Þiðrekr's entanglement in the downfall of the Niflings, after which Þiðrekr successfully returns to Verona and recovers his kingdom. Much later, after the death of both Hildebrand and his wife Herrad, Þiðrekr kills a dragon who had killed King Hernit of Bergara, marrying the widow and becoming king of Bergara. After Attila's death, Þiðrekr becomes king of the Huns as well. The final time he fights an opponent is to avenge the death of Heime (who had become a monk and then sworn loyalty to Þiðrekr once again). After this, he spends all his time hunting. One day, upon seeing a particularly magnificent deer, he jumped out of the bathtub and mounted a gigantic black horse – which is actually the devil in equine form. It rides away with him, and no one knows what happened to him after that, but the Germans believe that he received God and Mary's grace and was saved.

In addition to the life of Þiðrekr, various other heroes' lives are recounted as well in various parts of the story, including Attila, Wayland the Smith (in the section called Velents þáttr smiðs), Sigurd, the Nibelungen, and Walter of Aquitaine. The section recounting Þiðrekr's avenging of Hertnit seems to have resulted from a confusion between Þiðrekr and the similarly named Wolfdietrich.

== Manuscripts ==
The manuscripts of the Þiðreks saga are:

- Royal Library, Stockholm, Perg. fol. nr 4 (Mb), Norway, on parchment, dating c. 1275-1300 and formerly in the possession of Arni Sigurdsson, bishop of Bergen. The manuscript was written by five hands (Mb1-Mb5): the two main writers, Mb2 and Mb3, appear to have used two different source manuscripts, with Mb3 following a version closer to the later Icelandic paper manuscripts A and B. The manuscript has major lacunae, mostly at the beginning and end.
- Copenhagen, Arnamagnæan Institute, AM 178 fol. (A), Iceland, on paper, 17th century. Based on a lost parchment manuscript.
- Copenhagen, Arnamagnæan Institute, AM 177 fol. (B), Iceland, on paper, dated 1690–1691. Based on a lost parchment manuscript.
- Royal Library, Stockholm, Papp. nr 100 fol. (C), Iceland, on paper, 17th century. This manuscript is a copy of A and Mb, and shares the same lacunae as Mb.

Of these, the manuscripts Mb, A, and B are the most important. The Swedish version (Sv) is preserved in two manuscripts:

- Skokloster Castle Library, E 9013 (formerly Codex Skokloster 115, 116 4°), Sweden, end of 15th or early 16th century
- Royal Library, Stockholm, Papp. K 45 4°, Sweden, on paper, first half of 16th century

The Swedish version is useful for reconstructing the text where the other versions disagree.

=== Redactions ===
There are at least two redactions of the Old Norse Þiðreks saga, with the two main scribes of the oldest manuscript, Mb, each following a different redaction. Scribe Mb3 has followed a manuscript with a redaction similar to that found in the later Icelandic manuscripts A and B, whereas Mb2 has followed a manuscript source representing a different redaction of the material. One of main differences between the redactions is the placement of the section called "Vilkina saga": in Mb2 “Vilkina saga” is placed early in the text, whereas Mb3 has placed it later, in a section largely concerning other marriages of heroes (as a result, "Vilkina saga" appears twice in Mb). Mb3 has inserted two sections, Sigurd's youth and a long description of the various heroes after Thidrek's feast, into the sequence of chapters written by Mb2. It is possible that Mb2 had forgotten this material or else chosen to omit it. The two redactions also contain differences in the names, number (3 vs. 4 brothers), and origins of the Burgundian kings.

== Composition and sources ==
=== Sources of the compilation ===
There is no doubt that the sources of the Þiðreks saga were mostly Middle High German or Middle Low German. It is thus the only extant example of a translation from (Low) German to Old Norse. Given its dating to around 1250, it is roughly contemporary with the parallel German heroic epics, with only the Nibelungenlied predating it. Some scholars have argued that the Nibelungenlied itself was a source of the saga, while others have argued that a conjectured earlier Nibelungen epic was a source, and that this hypothesized epic was also the source for the second half of the Nibelungenlied. Because of the saga's localization of Attila's court at Soest, it is taken to indicate a local tradition that placed the fall of the Burgundians at that Hanseatic city. The prologue of the saga states that it was composed based on the tales of German men, but its language is somewhat obscure and scholars debate what precisely this means. The prologue also mentions tales told across Scandinavia and Iceland as sources on Sigurd, the Nibelungs, and Wayland the smith. Some material may be original to the compiler, having been put together using various motifs found in other heroic tales.

=== Time and place of composition ===
Most scholars believe that the saga was probably composed in Bergen, Norway, at the court of king Haakon IV, sometime around 1250. Haakon had important Danish-Saxon dynastic connections, as his son Magnus VI was married to Ingeborg, a Danish-Saxon princess, and his chancery also included a number of clerics of German origin, who could have acted as intermediaries for material from the continent. Additionally, Bergen was an import trading center for the North German Hanseatic League, who had merchants that resided there and could have brought German stories to Norway. The composition of a saga based on German materials fits into the larger project of importing courtly literature under Haakon, which also resulted in the adaptation of the chivalric sagas from mostly French sources. However, there is no direct evidence that Haakon commissioned the Þiðreks saga. The saga matches the milieu of Haakon's court and adaptations in its frequent use of courtly and chivalric vocabulary. Likewise, the name of Þiðrekr's sister is Isolde, and her son is Tristram (Tristan), which points to courtly influence, and the influence of Arthurian literature is also found in the saga; however, Claudia Bornholdt cautions that such influence could have taken place in either Germany or Norway.

The composer of the Þiðreks saga in Old Norse is unknown; scholars debate whether he was an Icelander or a Norwegian. The composer appears to have been educated, meaning he was probably a cleric, as was the only named author of a chivalric saga, Brother Robert.

=== Translation or compilation? ===
Scholars are divided between those that believe that the composer of the saga translated a lost Low German original ("translation hypothesis") and those who believe that the sources were mostly oral and conveyed to Norway by merchants of the Hanseatic League, only being joined in Norway ("compilation hypothesis"). There is little evidence outside of the text itself that would point either way. Most scholars adhering to the "translation hypothesis" have been German, while most adhering to the "compilation hypothesis" have been Norwegian.

The most recent main proponent of the "translation hypothesis" is Theodore Andersson, who regards the text as more German than Norwegian. Andersson argued that the saga was originally composed in Northern Germany around 1200, arguing that the compositional principals and his proposed sources for various episodes indicated familiarity with early courtly literature such as Spielmannsepik and the Kaiserchronik (c. 1150), as well as conjectured predecessor epics for the Nibelungenlied and Dietrich epics.

The main proponent of the saga having been composed in Norway today is Susanne Kramarz-Bein. She has argued that parallels in structure and content to the Karlamagnús saga and other chivalric sagas show that the saga must have been composed with its current structure at Haakon's court in Norway. One of the main arguments in favor of the saga's composition in Norway is that no large scale epic or prose work in Low German has survived that would show that such compilations existed in Northern Germany. On the other hand, there are many Norse examples. Arguments for an oral tradition as the source of the saga are mostly based on the prologue's mention of "tales of German men" as sources. As opposed to the traditional "translation theory" on the basis of purely oral sources, Kramarz-Bein has argued for a "composition theory:" that the compiler of the saga relied on various written sources as well as oral sources.

== Genre and interpretation ==
Long-standing controversy exists as to what genre the Þiðreks saga belongs to, chivalric saga or legendary saga. On the one hand, it contains legendary stories; on the other, it does not take place vaguely in a legendary past but after the death of Constantine the Great, involves concrete, European geography, and includes King Arthur and Apollonius of Tyre among its characters. The dominant scholarly theory is that the Þiðreks saga was written in the same context as the chivalric sagas, namely, as a translation of courtly material from the continent; however, its manuscript transmission in Iceland is in the same contexts as the legendary sagas. Scandinavian scholars have generally been more comfortable discussing the Þiðreks saga as a chivalric saga.

Susanne Kramarz-Bein and Heinrich Beck have both argued that the saga shows pro-Scandinavian leanings, exemplified in the way in which it treats the heroes Viðga, Þétleifr Danskr (Middle High German: Dietleib von Stîre) and Heimir: Heimir, portrayed as Swabian, is a mostly negative figure, whereas the heroes Viðga and Þétleifr, both portrayed as Danes, are given many positive traits that put them above Thidrek's other heroes. The same scholars have also argued that the localization of the Huns in the North-German Duchy of Saxony could be related to these northern political, potentially pro-Welf leanings.

== Structure and organization ==
The Þiðreks saga is divided into books, which are also referred to as sagas. Various proposals have been made about the original arrangement of the material. The scribes Mb2 and Mb3 of the oldest manuscript Mb follow different arrangements of the books and chapters. The manuscripts A, B, and the Swedish version likewise all have different arrangements of the sub-sagas. Germanist Thomas Klein argued for a three-part structure of the saga, in which part one shows the youth and bringing together of the heroes, part two focuses on marriage, and part three shows death and old age. This basic structure is also supported by Susanne Kramarz-Bein.

== Swedish adaptation ==
The Þiðreks saga also exists in a late medieval Old Swedish adaptation, known as the Didriks Krönika (also: Didrikskrönikan) or, less frequently, Didriks saga. (Note: Non-academic researcher Heinz Ritter-Schaumburg refers to the Didriks Krönika as the "Svava," a name without any basis in the text.) Most scholars agree that the Didriks Krönika used the oldest extant manuscript of the Þiðreks saga (Mb) as its main source. It is possible that German and Danish sources were used as well, as various names show forms closer to their German or Low German counterparts, and the text shows some Danish linguistic forms. However, there is no consensus as to whether these sources were written or oral. The vocabulary of the text shows many connections to contemporary courtly culture in Germany.

Most scholars agree that the adaptation was likely composed in the mid 15th century, possibly in the 1450s or 1460s. There is a disagreement whether the saga was composed in a Franciscan monastery or at Vadstena Abbey in Sweden. It has been suggested that the saga may have been adapted under the patronage of Swedish King Charles VII. Interest in adapting the Þiðreks saga may have been sparked by the saga's portrayal of Swedish control of a large Baltic empire called "Vilcinaland", which included Swedish rule over its rival Denmark.

The Didriks Krönika is not a literal translation of the Þiðreks saga but an adaptation for a contemporary Swedish public. The adapter has abbreviated the saga greatly. Episodes not connected to the main plot have been removed and others reduced to only what is essential for the main plot. The adapter has also made additions to the text in some places and sought to remove contradictions from his Norwegian source.

== Influence ==
The Þiðreks saga was an important influence on the chivalric sagas written after it, including Erex saga, Mágus saga jarls, Kirialax saga, Blómstrvallasaga, and Samsons saga fagra. The author of the Völsunga saga appears to have known the Þiðreks saga as well. This includes a description of Sigurd's armor that is adopted directly from the Þiðreks saga. Old Norse scholar Klaus von See argued that the Völsunga saga was written in response to the Þiðreks saga as a "re-Scandinavianisation" of the material. The Þiðreks saga was also influential on Swedish literature even before the writing of the Didriks Krönika, with Dietrich being mentioned in Herr Ivan lejonriddare (1303) - one of the translated romances known as the Eufemiavisorna - and the Eric Chronicle (c. 1320–1335). Additionally, several late medieval ballads were based on material found in the Þiðreks saga.

The Swedish Didriks Krönika inspired at least two pictorial depictions. Around 1480, artist Albertus Pictor included the scene of Didrik's fight with Wideke and the latter's flight into the sea was included, along with the battles of several other biblical and legendary heroes, on the roof of Floda church in Södermanland, Sweden. An illumination in a law codex from Uppland from the mid 15th century also shows a scene from the saga: it shows the knight Sistram, identified by text, half-swallowed in the jaws of a dragon.

The Swedish Didriks Krönika also influenced other texts produced on Dietrich von Bern and the Nibelungen in Scandinavia. In particular, Jonas Venusinus produced the Hvenske Krønike in Latin sometime after 1550, which transports the fall of Burgundians as told in the Didriks Krönika to his home island of Ven in the Øresund; the Hvenske Krønike was translated into Danish in 1603 by Anders Sørensen Vedel. The Didriks Krönika also had considerable influence on Swedish historiography as the saga identified the country of Vilkinaland with Sweden and so its line of kings was added to the Swedish line of kings. In spite of the fact that the early scholar Olaus Petri was critical, these kings were considered to have been historic Swedish kings until fairly recent times. The historicity of the kings of Vilkinaland was further boosted in 1634 when Johannes Bureus discovered the Norwegian parchment that had arrived in Sweden in the 15th century. The earliest edition of the Norwegian Þiðreks saga, together with a Latin translation, was published by Swedish antiquitarian Johan Peringskiöld in the early 18th century as the Vilkina saga due to Peringskiöld's interest in Gothicism.

Richard Wagner used it as a source for his operatic tetralogy Der Ring des Nibelungen.

== Editions and translations of the Old Norwegian text ==
Cover of Saga Điðriks konungs af Bern (1853), edited by Carl Richard Unger.

=== Editions ===
- Peringskiöld, Johann, ed. (1715). Wilkina-Saga, aller Historien om Konung Thiderich af Bern, och hans Kämpar. Stockholm.
- Unger, Henrik, ed. (1853). Saga Điðriks konungs af Bern: Fortælling om Kong Thidrik af Bern og hans kæmper, i norsk bearbeidelse fra det trettende aarhundrede efter tydske kilder. Christiania: Feilberg & Landmark.
- Bertelsen, Henrik, ed. (1905–1911). Þiðriks saga af Bern I. Samfund til udgivelse af gammel nordisk litteratur, 34. Vol. 1. Copenhagen: Møller.
- Bertelsen, Henrik, ed. (1905–1911). Þiðriks saga af Bern II. Samfund til udgivelse af gammel nordisk litteratur, 34. Vol. 2. Copenhagen: Møller.
- Jónsson, Guðni, ed. (1951). Þiðreks saga af Bern. Reykjavík. (normalised version of Bertelsen's edition)

=== Translations ===
==== English ====
- The Saga of Thidrek of Bern. Translated by Haymes, Edward R. Garland. 1988. ISBN 0-8240-8489-6.

==== Other ====
- Die Geschichte Thidreks von Bern (in German). Translated by Erichsen, Fine. Jena: Diederichs. 1924.
- Die Thidrekssaga oder Dietrich von Bern und die Niflungen (in German). Translated by von der Hagen, Friedrich Heinrich. St. Goar: Der Leuchter, Otto Reichl Verlag. 1989.
- Saga de Teodorico de Verona (in Spanish). Translated by González Campo, Mariano. Madrid: La Esfera de los Libros. 2010. ISBN 978-84-9321-036-6.
- Saga de Théodoric de Vérone (Þiðrikssaga af Bern) - Légendes heroiques d'Outre-Rhin (in French). Translated by Lecouteux, Claude. Paris: Honoré Champion. 2001. ISBN 2-7453-0373-2.
- Folkvisan om konung Didrik och hans kämpar (in Swedish). Translated by Klockhoff, Oskar. 1900.

== Editions and translations of the Old Swedish text ==
=== Editions ===
- Hyltén-Cavallius, Gunnar Olof, ed. (1850–1854). Sagan om Didrik af Bern. Stockholm: Norstedt. (Old Swedish text)
- Peringskiöld, Johan, ed. (1715). Wilkina saga, eller Historien om konung Thiderich af Bern och hans kämpar; samt Niflunga sagan; innehållandes några göthiska konungars och hieltars forna bedrifter i Ryszland, Polen, Ungern, Italien, Burgundien och Spanien &c. Sive Historia Wilkinensium, Theoderici Veronensis, ac niflungorum; continens regum atq; heroum quorundam gothicorum res gestas, per Russiam, Poloniam, Hungariam, Italiam, Burgundiam, atque Hispaniam, &c. Ex. mss. codicibus lingvæ veteris scandicæ. Stockholm. (also in Norwegian and Latin.)
- "Sagan om Didrik av Bern". Lunds universitet, Humanistiska och teologiska fakulteterna. (Diplomatic transcription of the manuscripts)

=== Translations ===
- Die Didriks-Chronik oder die Svava: das Leben König Didriks von Bern und die Niflungen (in German). Translated by Ritter-Schaumburg, Heinz. St. Goar: Der Leuchter. 1989. ISBN 3-87667-102-7.
- The Saga of Didrik of Bern, with The Dwarf King Laurin. Translated by Cumpstey, Ian. Skadi Press. 2017. ISBN 978-0-9576-1203-7. (in English)

== Works cited ==
- Andersson, Theodore M. (1994). "Composition and Literary Culture in Þiðreks saga". In Uecker, Heiko (ed.). Studien zum Altgermanischen: Festschrift für Heinrich Beck. Walter de Gruyter. pp. 1–23.
- Bornholdt, Claudia (2005). Engaging moments: the origins of medieval bridal-quest narrative. de Gruyter.
- Georgieva Eriksen, Stefka; Johansson, Karl G. (2012). "Francia et Germania – Translations and the Europeanisation of Old Norse Narratives". In Johansson, Karl G.; Flaten, Rune (eds.). Francia et Germania: Studies in Strengleikar and Þiðreks saga af Bern. Novus Forlag. pp. 9–52.
- Haymes, Edward R. (1988). "Introduction". The Saga of Thidrek of Bern. Translated by Haymes, Edward R. Garland. pp. xix–xxxii. ISBN 0-8240-8489-6.
- Haymes, Edward R.; Samples, Susan T. (1996). Heroic legends of the North: an introduction to the Nibelung and Dietrich cycles. New York: Garland. ISBN 0815300336.
- Heinzle, Joachim (1999). Einführung in die mittelhochdeutsche Dietrichepik (in German). Berlin, New York: De Gruyter. ISBN 3-11-015094-8.
- Jørgensen, Jon Gunnar (2012). "Didrik til hest - til øst fra vest". In Johansson, Karl G.; Flaten, Rune (eds.). Francia et Germania: Studies in Strengleikar and Þiðreks saga af Bern (in Norwegian). Novus Forlag. pp. 289–307.
- Hofmann, Dietrich (1990). "Das Verhältnis der altschwedischen Didriks-Chronik zur Þiðreks saga – und zur historischen Wirklichkeit". Skandinavistik (in German). 20 (1): 95–110.
- Kalinke, Marianne E. (2017). Stories Set Forth with Fair Words: The Evolution of Medieval Romance in Iceland. University of Wales Press. ISBN 978-1-78683-067-8.
- Kramarz-Bein, Susanne (2002). Die Þiðreks saga im Kontext der altnorwegischen Literatur (in German). A. Francke Verlag.
- Kramarz-Bein, Susanne (2006). "Zur altostnordischen Karls- und Dietrichdichtung". Amsterdamer Beiträge zur älteren Germanistik (in German). 62: 99–121. doi:10.1163/18756719-062001006.
- Kramarz-Bein, Susanne (2010) [2008]. "Þiðreks saga af Bern". Germanische Altertumskunde Online (in German). de Gruyter.
- Kramarz-Bein, Susanne (2012). "Þiðreks saga in the Context of Old Norwegian Literature". In Johansson, Karl G.; Flaten, Rune (eds.). Francia et Germania: Studies in Strengleikar and Þiðreks saga af Bern. Novus Forlag. pp. 251–264.
- Larrington, Carolyne (2012). "Völsunga Saga, Ragnars Saga and Romance in Old Norse: Revisiting Relationships". In Lassen, Annette; Ney, Agneta; Jakobsson, Árman (eds.). The Legendary Sagas: Origins and Development. University of Iceland Press. pp. 250–270.
- Lienert, Elisabeth (2008). Dietrich-Testimonien des 6. bis 16. Jahrhunderts (in German). Tübingen: Niemeyer. ISBN 978-3-484-64504-2.
- Millet, Victor (2008). Germanische Heldendichtung im Mittelalter (in German). Berlin, New York: de Gruyter. ISBN 978-3-11-020102-4.
- Tuulse, Armin (1975). "Didrik av Bern och Norden". Konsthistorisk Tidskrift (in Swedish). 44 (3–4): 67–69. doi:10.1080/00233607508603860.
