= Asmund Berserkers-Slayer =

Legendary Icelandic hero

Asmund Berserks-Slayer is a viking hero in the Icelandic legendary saga Egils saga einhenda ok Ásmundar berserkjabana. He is also known as Gnodar-Asmund in other sagas in which his stepfather was Illugi, Foster-Son of Grid.

== Egil and Asmund ==
In the Saga of Egil and Asmund, or Egils saga einhenda ok Ásmundar berserkjabana, Asmund was the son of King Ottar, ruler of Halogaland, and Sigrid, daughter of the Danish Jarl Ottar, who ruled over Jutland.

By the time Asmund was twelve, he was already fully grown, and a great deal stronger than any man he knew. Once while chasing a hare he ran into a large powerful man named Aran, who was also 12. Aran was the son of King Rodian of Tartary, and had left his father's kingdom in search of any one his equal. Asmund and Aran then proceeded to compete against each other in every athletic contest they knew. After performing with equal skill at every contest they attempted, and when exhaustion took over them, they agreed to become blood brothers and to never lift sword against one another. They from that day on promised to split all each other ever owned halfway between them. Aran then gave Asmund half of his Viking fleet of 10 ships and the two both sailed to Tartary. Once arrived they discovered Aran's father the king was dead, and the land was being pillage by the Ethiopian brothers Bull-Bear and Visin. Asmund and Aran made short work of them, after which Aran was crowned king and Asmund was given half of everything Aran owned. Shortly after Aran died Asmund attempted to claim the kingdom as his own in which he had to battle Aran's Berserker uncles Hrærek and Siggeir. He was heavily outnumbered and captured by the brothers, who tied him up for the night and planned to sacrifice him to Odin in the morning. Asmund was able to break free and exact murderous revenge on the Berserkers. Afterwards the dead king's father-in-law, King Herraud who ruled Hunland, showed up with 20 ships, and chased away the remaining supporters of the dead Berserkers. Asmund then went before King Herraud and explained the agreement Aran and he had come to. Herraud thought it was a good idea to keep the agreement. Asmund then asked for the best ships the king had to offer and went off plundering.

== Sources ==
- Hermann Pålsson (1985). Seven Viking Romances. London. ISBN 0-14-044474-2
