= Norna-Gests þáttr =

Norse legendary saga

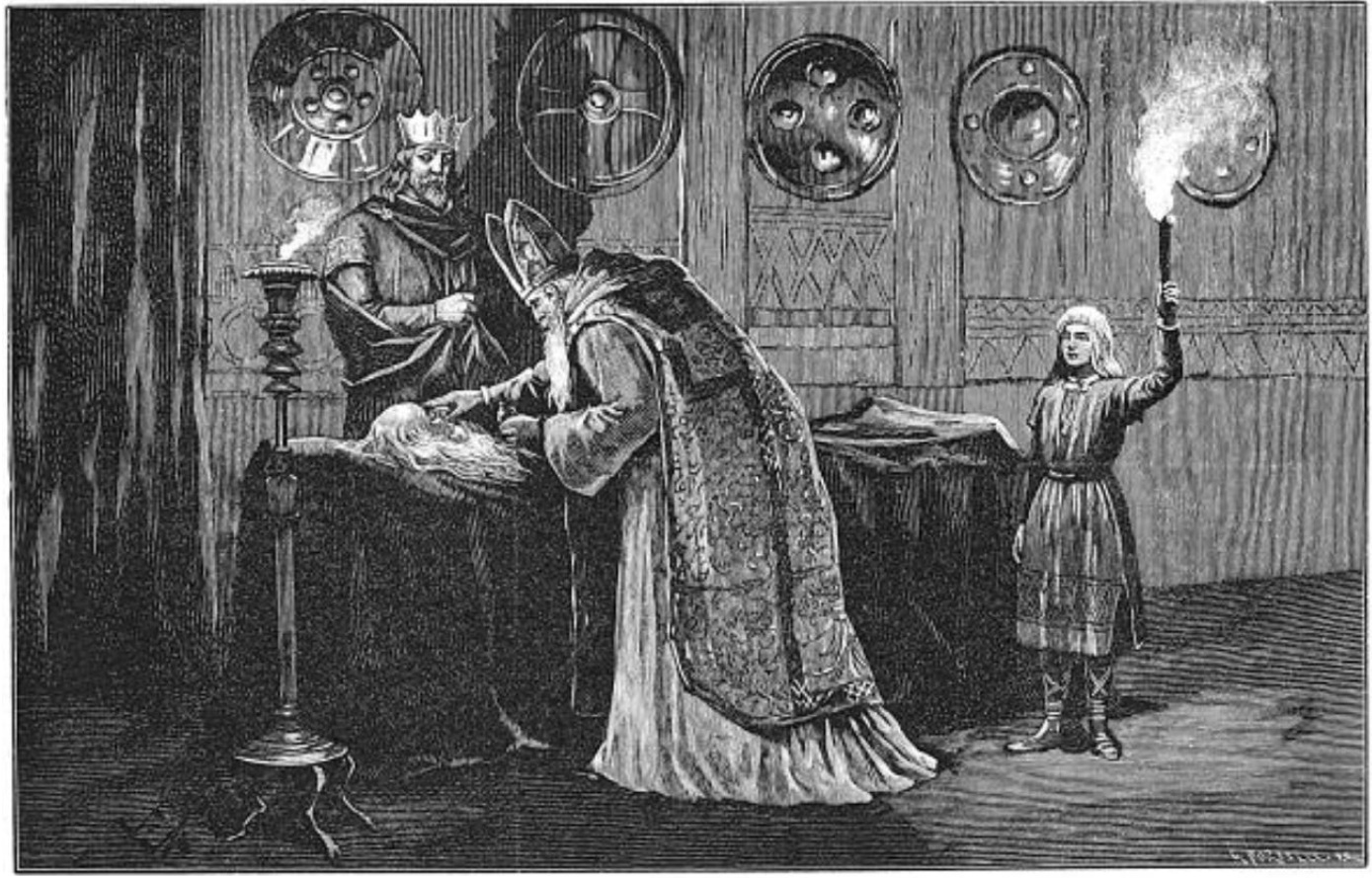
The Death of Nornagest —Gunnar Vidar Forssell (1893)

Nornagests þáttr or the Story of Norna-Gest is a legendary saga about the Norse hero Nornagestr, sometimes called Gestr, and here anglicized as Norna-Gest. Nornagests þáttr is as an episode of the Longest Saga of Óláfr Tryggvason found in the medieval Icelandic manuscript Flateyjarbók as well as some other mss. (Note: Flateyjarbók (ms. F); AM 62 (ms. S); GKS 2845 (ms. A)) The work is generally dated to the early 14th century, but the oldest manuscripts containing it date to the late 14th century.

== Summary ==
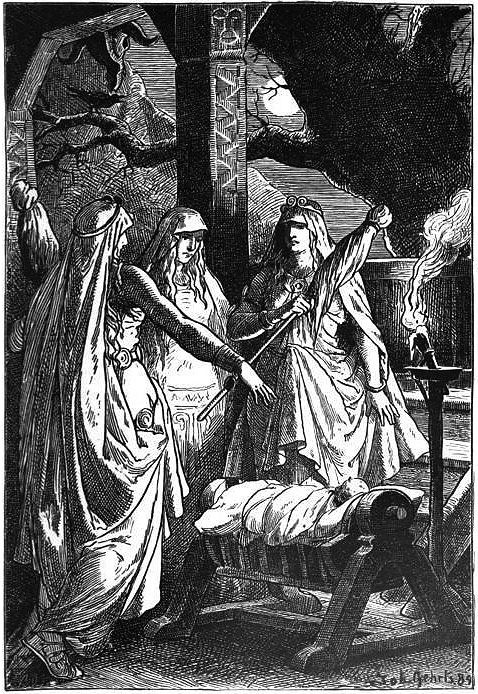
Die Nornen —Johannes Gehrts (1889)

The work uses the formula of a frame story about a figure who has enjoyed tremendous longevity (here Norna-gestr) who is able to recount numerous embedded tales in the form of his memories. He is presently a guest of the Norwegian king Óláfr Tryggvasson, having arrived in the third year of the Óláfr's reign. (Note: The story also dates Norna-gestr's arrival as the same year when King Guðmundr of Glæsisvellir sent along two horns called Grímr (pl. Grímar; tr. "Grim") as gifts to Olav Tryggvasson.) Norna-gestr introduces himself as the son of a Danish man named Þórðr þingbítr (Thord Thingbiter "the contentious"), who once dwelt on the estate of Grøning in Denmark.

The frame story returns later (after recounting the many tales of his past, cf. § Witness to legendary history) to Norna-gestr (meaning "guest of the Norns") explaining that he earned his name due to what happened at his birth, when three spae-women (Old Norse: spákonur) arrived and foretold the child's destiny. Two of them gave him good gifts. However the youngest Norn (Note: Not named, but the youngest of the Nornir is called Skuld according to eddic tradition.) had not been consulted and was feeling belittled; what is more, the uninvited one got shoved to the ground by the crowd that gathered. Determined now to void her sisters' gifts of good fortune, she prophesied the child's life to last no longer than the burning candle standing next to the cradle. The eldest Norn (Note: Not named, but she would be Urðr according to eddic tradition.) instantly extinguished the flame and asked his mother to hide it well. (Note: Chapter XI (of XII).)

=== Wager triggers recollection ===
A wager takes place to decide which item is more precious, the arm ring Hnituðr (tr. Hnituth), that once belonged to King Hálfr of the Hálfsrekkar fame, presented to King Olaf by Úlfr the Red, and the piece of gold Gestr claims is in his possession. (Note: Chapter II.) The next morning, Gestr produces out of his pouch (Note: Old Norse: knýti, tr. "fob") a piece of a saddle buckle, (Note: Old Norse: sǫðulhringja, tr. "saddle buckle") and it is agreed Gestr's gold is better. Gestr begins telling the provenance of this buckle that came off the horse of Sigurðr Fáfnisbani the Völsung, (Note: Chapter III.) and goes on to tell his whole life story. (Note: This is the transition from the frame story to the embedded story; it is characterized as "the complex scenario that brings about Gestr's loquaciousness in Norna-Gests þáttr".)

=== Witness to legendary history ===
Norna-Gest grew ancient as custodian of his own life-candle, and has now attained the age of three-hundred years. He recounts his visit to the Land of Franks (Rhineland) to witness its famed prince, Sigurðr the Völsung, then served as Sigurðr's liegeman, (Note: Chapter IV.) witnessing the highlights of Sigurðr's life: his tutelage under the dwarf Regin skilled in magic; how Regin crafted the sword Gramr and incited Sigurðr to kill the dragon Fáfnir who was Regin's own sibling; how Sigurðr had the sons of Hundingr to contend with, these sons of Hundingr being his father's murderers, and although his half-brother Helgi Hundingsbani had slain some of them, others like Lyngvi Hundingsson still survived and had overrun his birthright kingdom. (Note: Chapter V.) Several eddaic lays are quoted in the telling of these stories. (Note: Reginsmál in Ch. V, Helreið Brynhildar in Ch. IX.) (Note: Reginsmál in Ch. V, VI; Helreið Brynhildar in Ch. IX.) Sigurðr accomplishes the vendetta, more or less according to tradition (i.e., regurgitating the Edda and Völsunga saga (Note: Kershaw notes the account of the battle (against Lyngvi and his brethren) in Ch. VI is given in Völsunga saga Ch. 17.)). Whereas the Völsunga saga fails to mention Lygvi being subjected to the blood eagle, and the poem only gives a stanza where Regin states the deed was done, a fuller detail is elaborated in Nornagests þáttr, where it is alleged Nornagestr handed Regin his weapon, and Regin performed the carving ritual on Lyngvi (cf. also blood eagle § Regin and Lyngvi). (Note: Chapter VI.) (Note: That Regin owned the sword Riðill is stated at the beginning of this chapter, as an item loaned to Sigurðr; however, further into the chapter, Sigurðr is only portrayed as using Gramr to fight the sons of Hunding.)

Norna-Gest also described how the Danish (Swedish) king Sigurðr hringr sent his brothers-in-law, the sons of Gandálfr, to demand tribute from the sons of Gjúki, Gunnar and Högni while Sigurðr was staying with them. In the ensuing fight, the giant Starkaðr flees upon hearing the mention of Sigurðr Fáfnisbani's name; Sigurðr struck out two of the giant's molars hitting him in the jaw with the hilt of his sword Gramr; one of these teeth Nornagest picked up; weighing in at 7 ounces, (Note: Old Norse: aura, sing. Old Norse: eyrir. 1 eyrir weighed perhaps 27.125 grams, vs. UK ounce weighing 28.3 grams. Also a unit of currency.) it became a bell used at a church in Lund (cf. Starkad § Norna-Gests þáttr). (Note: Chapter VII.) (Note: In Chapter VIII, Starkaðr still lives, committing mischief, but the story is told how the gold saddle-buckle came off when Grani's breast harness (Old Norse: brjóstgerðin, translated as "saddle-girth" by Kershaw ) was sundered. Chapter IX retells the undoing of Sigurðr by the treachery of the Gjúking and the Brynhildr joining in death, much according to eddic and Völsunga saga material, as there is a heavy amount of quoting from the older poems.)

Norna-Gest also spent time with (Sigurðr hringr's son) Ragnarr loðbrók (Ragnar "Hairy-breeches"), as well as Ragnarr's son Björn Ironside and his brothers. He was also in the company of King Erik at Uppsala, (Note: "Eirekr at Uppsölum" (normalized spelling: Eiríkr). This king is only vaguely annotated as a Swedish king of the second half of the 9th century, and coeval with Harald Fairhair. This could refer to Erik Refilsson, Erik Björnsson, Erik Anundsson or Eric the Victorious. Erik Gustaf Geijer (1850) appears to favor "Eirikr Uppsali" of Hervarar saga, presumably Erik Anundsson, complicated by the fact that the recension of this saga that records the genealogy is considered corrupt, and to have interchanged the name with the father Anund Uppsale and son., as P. A. Munch (1850) pointed out. The emendation according to Munch is made in Bugge's edition (1873) of the saga, so that the correction appears silently as "King Onund [of Upsala] had a son called Eric, and he succeeded to the throne at Upsala... In his days Harold the Fair-haired made himself King of Norway" in Kershaw's translation of Hervarar saga.) and present when King Harald Fairhair was prime-signed (Note: Old Norse: primsigna "to give the prima signatio", a religious act, preliminary to christening".) by King Hlöðver of Germany (Louis the Pious of the Frankish Empire (Note: Hlöðver is how Louis the Pious is spelt in Óláfs saga Tryggvasonar en mesta as a whole,)). (Note: Chapter X.)

=== Epilogue ===
When Norna-Gest introduced himself to King Óláfr Tryggvason, known for his effort to convert the Norse to Christianity, the king immediately reproaches Norna-gest for only being prime-signed (or rather criticizing Svein Forkbeard for allowing a man to leave Denmark unbaptized). After relating his life-story, King Óláfr returns to the issue of whether Norna-Gestr will now consent to becoming baptized. Norna-Gestr permits himself to be baptized at the king's desire, and lights his life-candle. In accordance with the Norn's prophecy, when the candle burns down, Norna-Gest too expires.

== Analogues ==
The story of Nornagest and his candle has a counterpart in Greek mythology: the story of Meleager, who was prophesied to live only as long as a certain log was unburnt. The exhibited motif-index is "E 765.1.1 life bound up with candle"; or "765.1.2 (torch)". The story is included in Ovid's Metamorphoses.

The motif is also paralleled by the late romance of Ogier the Dane (the Alexandrine version, c. 1335) and the writer of Norna-Gests þáttr may have well fused portions of Ogier's legend, as had been suggested obliquely by Friedrich Panzer. (Note: Panzer's observations are complicated by the fact he regards Gestr to be a sword-bearer (Waffenträger). The first Latin source he partly quotes concerns Ricardus (Richard) claiming to be the sword-bearer of "Oliver the Dacian", the second source regards "Ogier the Dacian" who revives in a later age.)

== Faroese ballad ==
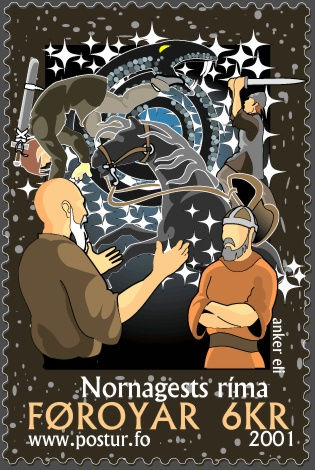
Nornagests ríma —Anker Eli Petersen (2001)

There is the Faroese ballad (kvæði) Nornagests ríma based on the þáttr (catalogued CCF 4), in 4 variants, first collected in 1818 by J. H. Schrøter from Suðuroy (version A), but this lay was preserved in manuscript ( NKS 345) and not printed until it appeared in Færoensia III (1951) 53–55. Thus the first text to be published was the B version printed by Lyngbye in 1822. V. U. Hammershaimb's version (1851) (version D) has been translated by Nora Kershaw (1921), and the same version by E. M. Smith-Dampier (1934). Another translation (version A) by Helen F. Leslie‐Jacobsen and Mortan Nolsøé Jacobsen appeared in 2025.

What triggers Nornagestur into telling his life story is far less complex than the þáttr (cf. § Wager triggers recollection), for in the ballad, when the king's (Note: The king is only specified as being Ólavur in the later versions) exploit of beheading twelve oxen in a single stroke fails to impress Nornagestur, he is then challenged to recount a more impressive feat he'd witnessed. Nornagestur's reminiscences are here restricted to Sigurðr (Faroese: Sjúrður, Sjúrur; pronunciation: /ˈʃʉuɹʊɹ/) material.

Because in this ballad version, Nornagestur's candle of life is not carried on his person, but hid in a lead metal container (version A (Note: version A, Str. 32: he "dived for a long time,/directly down to the lead that he found", where "lead" metal in Faroese is blýggið, (definite accusative form of blýggj).)) or lantern (version D (Note: Str. 44, ligtu (oblique case of lykt), tr. "lanthorn")) sunken beneath a lake, Kershaw sees this as exhibiting the worldwide motif of the "External Soul". Phycologist and folklore collector Hans Christian Lyngbye knew of folk tradition that Nornagest's soul candle was concealed in an airtight lead box and sunk in the fjord by his parents, and in his old age, the king finally told him its whereabouts so he can choose to die. Lyngbye also compared Nornagest to Nestor of Greek mythology who lived beyond 300 years.

=== Performances ===
Nornagests ríma performed by the Faroese band Tyr is recorded in the 2008 re-released version of their album, How Far to Asgaard; it is an easter egg track that occurs after a pause of silence after the bonus tracks.

== Nicander ==
Swedish poet Karl August Nicander wrote an adaption "Norna-Gest" in three parts: "The Arrival of the Guest" (Gästen kommer); "The Fighting of the Drunkards in the Hall" (De drucknas strid i salen); and "The Power of the Harp" (Harpans makt).

== Other adaptations ==
In modern science fiction, Poul Anderson incorporated the story of Nornagest in The Boat of a Million Years, a collection of short stories about immortals.
