= Ingeldaz =

Origin
- Region of origin: West Germanic

Ingeldaz was a West Germanic name which was early borrowed into North Germanic as Ingjaldr. The name is a combination of the reinforcing prefix in- and the element *-geldaz which means "payment". It is, however, also possible that the Scandinavian form Ingjaldr is a contraction of Ingivaldr.

People having the name:

- Ingeld, who appears in e.g. Beowulf and Gesta Danorum.
- Ingjald, legendary king of Sweden.
- Ingjald Ringsson, legendary prince of Denmark in Hrólfs saga Gautrekssonar.
