= Gautreks saga =

Scandinavian legendary saga

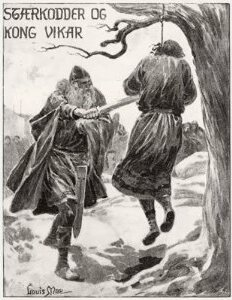
Starkad kills king Vikar, by Louis Moe.

Gautreks saga (Gautrek's Saga) is a Scandinavian legendary saga put to text towards the end of the 13th century which survives only in much later manuscripts. It seems to have been intended as a compilation of traditional stories, often humorous, about a legendary King Gautrek of West Geatland, to serve as a kind of prequel to the already existing Hrólfs saga Gautrekssonar (Saga of Hrólf son of Gautrek). See also king of the Geats.

== Summary ==
As it stands, the saga seems incomplete, for a promise is made that the tale will return to King Gautrek of Götaland and his sons, to "the same story as told in Sweden", and that promise is not kept. Indeed, other than the reference to Hrólfs saga Gautrekssonar, no sons are mentioned. But it seems that Gautrek was noted in many tales for his generosity and bravery, but not for deep thinking, according to a passage near the end. It is probable there were more amusing anecdotes to that effect that the author planned to include.

There are actually two main versions of Gautreks saga: a shorter, apparently older, version; and a longer, apparently more recent, one.

=== Shorter version ===
The shorter version begins by relating how Gautrekr's father-to-be, King Gauti of West Götaland, becomes lost while hunting, and spends the night in an isolated homestead of strange, arguably insane, backwoods bumpkins: a stingy farmer named Skafnörtungr ('Skinflint'), his equally stingy wife Tötra ('Tatters'), and their three sons and three daughters. That night Gauti fathers Gautrekr on Snotra, the eldest of the farmer's daughters and supposedly the most intelligent of the family. The account bristles with grisly humor as it relates how one by one the members of the family go on to kill themselves over the most trivial losses, believing that they will go to Óðinn in Valhöll, until at last only Snotra and her child Gautrekr remain. At that point Snotra takes Gautrekr to Gauti's court; years later, on his deathbed, King Gauti makes Gautrekr his heir. This section is sometimes referred to as Dalafífla þáttr ("The Tale of the Fools in the Valley").

The saga then shifts to a folk-tale-like account of how Refr, the lazy son of a farmer, forces his father's stupendous ox as gift upon the stingy but extraordinarily intelligent Jarl Neri and requests only Neri's advice in return. Jarl Neri normally never accepts gifts because he is too stingy to repay them. But he takes the ox and gives Ref a whetstone in return, telling him how to employ it as a gift to King Gautrekr to get greater wealth. The saga has mentioned Gautrek's marriage to Álfhildr, daughter of King Haraldr of Wendland, and Álfhildr's subsequent death by illness years later, which has driven the grieving Gautrekr somewhat out of his mind: ignoring all matters of state, Gautrekr spends all his time on Álfhildr's burial mound, flying his hawk. On Neri's advice, Refr gives the whetstone to Gautrekr at the moment that the king needs something to throw at his hawk; Gautrekr promptly gives Refr a gold ring. Refr goes on to visit king after king, in each case giving part or all of that which he received from the previous king, and getting in return a greater gift, since none of the kings want to be outdone by Gautrekr, who "gives gold in exchange for pebbles." At last, through Neri's advice and trickery, Refr gains the hand of Gautrekr's daughter Helga and an earldom that Neri held from King Gautrekr. This is often known as Gjafa-Refs þáttr ('the story of Gift-Refr').

The shorter version of the saga ends with an account of King Gautrekr's remarriage to the fair Ingibjörg, daughter of a powerful hersir in the Sogn region of Norway. Ingibjörg chooses Gautrekr for his fame and generosity, despite his age, over the young prince Óláfr who has also asked for her hand. Gautrekr fights off an attack by the rejected and disappointed Óláfr, marries Ingibjörg, and fathers two sons named Keti'l and Hrólfr with her.

=== Longer version ===
The younger and much better known version of the saga includes these two lighthearted tales, but inserts between them an account of the ancestry, birth, and earliest exploits of Starkaðr, who is perhaps the grimmest and strangest of Scandinavian legendary heroes. This account, sometimes known as Víkars þáttr ("The Tale of Víkar"), was probably extracted or retold from a lost saga about Starkaðr; it contains extensive poetry, ostensibly by Starkaðr himself, and it ends tragically. A high point of this section is the evocative episode where Starkaðr's foster-father Grani Horsehair awakens his foster-son Starkaðr at about midnight, takes him to an island where eleven men are at council, and, sitting in a twelfth chair reveals himself as the god Óðinn. In a long dialogue between the gods Þór and Óðinn, the two alternately bestow curses and blessings upon Starkaðr. When this is done, Óðinn requires Starkaðr to sacrifice King Víkar, his sworn lord, friend, and benefactor. Starkaðr persuades Víkar to put his neck in a noose of stretchy calf intestines and be stabbed with a fragile reed, thus undergoing a mock sacrifice. Unfortunately, the sacrifice turns real when the noose becomes rope and the reed turns into a spear, leaving Vikar stabbed and hanged, and bringing down grief and disgrace on Starkaðr for killing his lord.

This middle section is so stylistically unlike the happier stories that "bookend" it that some have questioned whether it should have been included at all. The only obvious link is because King Vikar, who appears prominently in it, is father of Jarl Neri who plays a very important role in the material following and also because Eirík king of Sweden, who appears in it, was prominent in Hrólfs saga Gautrekssonar. Nonetheless, there are themes that connect all three sections of this saga; for example, both Starkaðr and Refr are unpromising youths, and both Neri and Skafnortung are misers. The entire saga seems to be a meditation on generosity: sacrifice to the gods is useless, and stinginess is not admirable—but giving and receiving gifts, participating in networks of reciprocal exchange, is the way to good fortune.

The longer version does not include the story of Gautrekr's remarriage, but essentially the same account appears at the beginning of Hrólfs saga Gautrekssonar.

== Analogues ==
Snorri Sturluson introduces Gauti and Gautrek in his Ynglinga saga where Gauti "after whom Gautland (Götaland) is named" is mentioned as the father of Gautrek the Generous the father of King Algaut the father of Gauthild who married Ingjald the son of King Önund of Sweden. This should make Gautrek live in the early 7th century, approximately contemporary with Önund's father Yngvar or possibly Yngvar's father Eystein in whose days, according to Snorri, the Danish king Hrólf Kraki died. And indeed Hrólf Kraki is one of the kings whom Ref visits in the saga. Another king visited by Ref is Ælle of England and the historical King Ælle of Deira could well be contemporary to the legendary Hrólf Kraki of Denmark. However in the section concerning Starkad, the kings of Sweden are the brothers Alrek and Eirík which, if one trusts the order of kings in the Ynglinga saga, would put Gautrek generations earlier.

However in Bósa saga ok Herrauds (The saga of Herraud and Bósi), Gautrek's supposed half-brother Hring is a contemporary of King Harald Wartooth.

Gjafa-Refs þáttr has a close parallel in Saxo Grammaticus's Gesta Danorum. The parallels are summarised by Michael Chesnutt as follows:

Gesta Danorum (8.16:1-4)	Gjafa-Refs þáttr
Two Icelanders, Refo and Bero, visit King Goto of Norway.	A Norwegian, Refr, brings an ox to Earl Neri of Gautland.
	The courtiers mock him.
Refo claims that King Gotricus is the greatest giver of gifts.	The earl predicts that King Gautrekr will make Refr a gift.
Refo travels to King Gotricus.	Refur travels to King Gautrekr.
Some of the courtiers laugh.	
The king, sitting on a chair, gives him two gold rings.	The king, sitting on a mound, gives him a gold ring.
	[More visits to generous kings.]
Refo kills the evil Ulvo.	Refr defeats the evil Refnefr.
He abducts the King of Norway's daughter.	He marries the King of Gautland's daughter.
Later, Refo serves Gotricus, but he is murdered in Sweden.	Refr is appointed Gautrekr's earl, but it is said that he died young.

== In popular culture ==
Translated into Swedish in 1664, the saga's depiction of the Ættarstapi gave rise to a fashion in early-modern Sweden for labelling inland cliffs with the Swedish equivalent of that name, Ättestupa. The idea of the ättestupa went on to appear extensively in popular culture.

The saga is one of the key inspirations for Bjarni Bjarnason's 2011 novel Mannorð.

== Bibliography and external links ==
=== Bibliography ===
- Entry in Stories for All Time: The Icelandic Fornaldarsögur

=== English translations ===
- Ancestry: Gautrek's saga
- "King Gautrek" in Seven Viking Romances. Trans. Pálsson, Hermann and Edwards, Paul (1985). Harmondsworth, England: Penguin. ISBN 0-14-044474-2.
- "King Gautrek" in Gautrek's Saga and Other Medieval Tales. Trans. Pálsson, Hermann and Edwards, Paul (1968). London: University of London Press. ISBN 0-340-09396-X.
- Gautrek's Saga. Trans. Fox, Denton and Pálsson, Hermann (1974). Toronto: University of Toronto Press. ISBN 0-8020-1925-0.
- Waggoner, Ben (2014). Six Sagas of Adventure. New Haven, Conn.: The Troth. pp. 1–33. ISBN 978-1941136041.

=== Original text ===
- Gothrici & Rolfi Westrogothiae Regum Historia, Lingua Antiqua Gothica Conscripta, ed. and trans. by Olaus Verelius (Uppsala, 1664)
- Gautreks saga in Old Norse from heimskringla.no
- Snerpa: Netúgáfan: Fornrit: Gautreks saga
- Handrit: Gautreks saga
