= Hálfdanar saga Brönufóstra =

Hálfdanar saga Brönufóstra c. 1300 is a legendary saga about Halfdan the son of the legendary king Hringr of Denmark.

In the saga, Halfdan flees his father's kingdom after an attack by the Viking berserker Soti, and goes to live in exile in Bjarmaland. During a sea-voyage he is dragged off course by the witchcraft of a troll named Járnnefr (Iron-Nose) and shipwrecked on the shore of Helluland. Here he rescues the three children of a Scottish earl from the troll and his wife. Halfdan encounters a troll-woman named Brana who is really a half-troll: her mother is the daughter of the king of Valland and was abducted by the troll Jarnhauss (Iron-Skull), who is Brana's father. She asks Halfdan and his friends to avenge her by killing Jarnhauss and his fellow trolls. In return, she provides them with shelter, and gives Halfdan a magic ring, a coat that makes him invulnerable to edged weapons, and a dragon-ship. She sends Halfdan to England where he wins the love of Marsibil, daughter of the English king Óláfr, and defeats the schemes of the king's landwarden, Aki, with Brana's magical aid. He marries Marsibil and succeeds Óláfr when he dies. He returns to his father's kingdom and defeats and kills Soti and his Vikings.

Although numerous sagas contain analogs to the iconic cave battle with Grendel and his mother in Beowulf, none is closer to the Old English epic than is Hálfdan’s cave battle with Járnnefr and his wife. The saga is found in three, 15th-century vellum manuscripts, but its post-medieval popularity is evidenced by its preservation in over four dozen paper manuscripts. In the 18th century it served as the source for the first known saga forgery. Hálfdanar saga Brönufóstra has a sequel in Sörla saga sterka, where it becomes clear that Halfdan is the father of Hogni of the Hjaðningavíg.

== Translations ==
- Waggoner, Ben (2010). Sagas of Giants and Heroes. New Haven, CT: Troth Publications. ISBN 978-0578059334. (Saga of Halfdan, Brana's Fosterling, pp. 87–110)

== Sources and external links ==
- The saga in Old Norse at Snerpa.
- The saga in Old Norse at «Norrøne Tekster og Kvad».
- The saga in Old Norse at Northvegr.
- Helpful Danes and Pagan Irishmen: Saga Fantasies of the Viking Age in the British Isles, by Elizabeth Ashman Rowe.
