= Hrólfr Gautreksson =

Hrólfr Gautreksson was a legendary Geatish king who appears in Hrólfs saga Gautrekssonar and probably in Hyndluljóð.

Hrólfs saga Gautrekssonar tells that he was the son of king Gautrek and when his father died, his elder brother Ketill became king. Hrólfr would court and finally win the Swedish king Erik's daughter Þornbjörg, who was a violent and proud ruler. He later succeeded his brother as king.

There is also an isolated stanza in Hyndluljóð where Hrólfr the Old appears. The names Þorir the Iron-Shield and Grímr shows that the lines probably refer to Þorir and Grímr Þorkelsson who appear with Hrólfr in Hrólfs saga Gautrekssonar.

Gunnar the Bulwark, Grim the Hardy, Thorir the Iron-shield, Ulf the Gaper, Brodd and Hörvir both did I know; In the household they were of Hrolf the Old. -Bellows translation	Gunnar Midwall, Grím the Hardy, Iron-Shield Thórir, Úlf the Gaping, Brodd and Horvir both I knew them - they housecarls were with Hrólf the Old. -Auden and Taylor's translation

Translations: Hrolf Gautreksson, a Viking romance. Translated by Hermann Pálsson, Paul Geoffrey Edwards. University of Toronto Press, 1972. 148 pages.

== Primary sources ==
- Hrólfs saga Gautrekssonar
- Hrólfs saga Gautrekssonar
- Hrólfs saga Gautrekssonar Ed. Guðni Jónsson and Bjarni Vilhjálmsson
- Hrólfs saga Gautrekssonar
- Hrólfs saga Gautrekssonar
- Hyndluljóð
