= Sörla saga sterka =

Legendary Norse saga

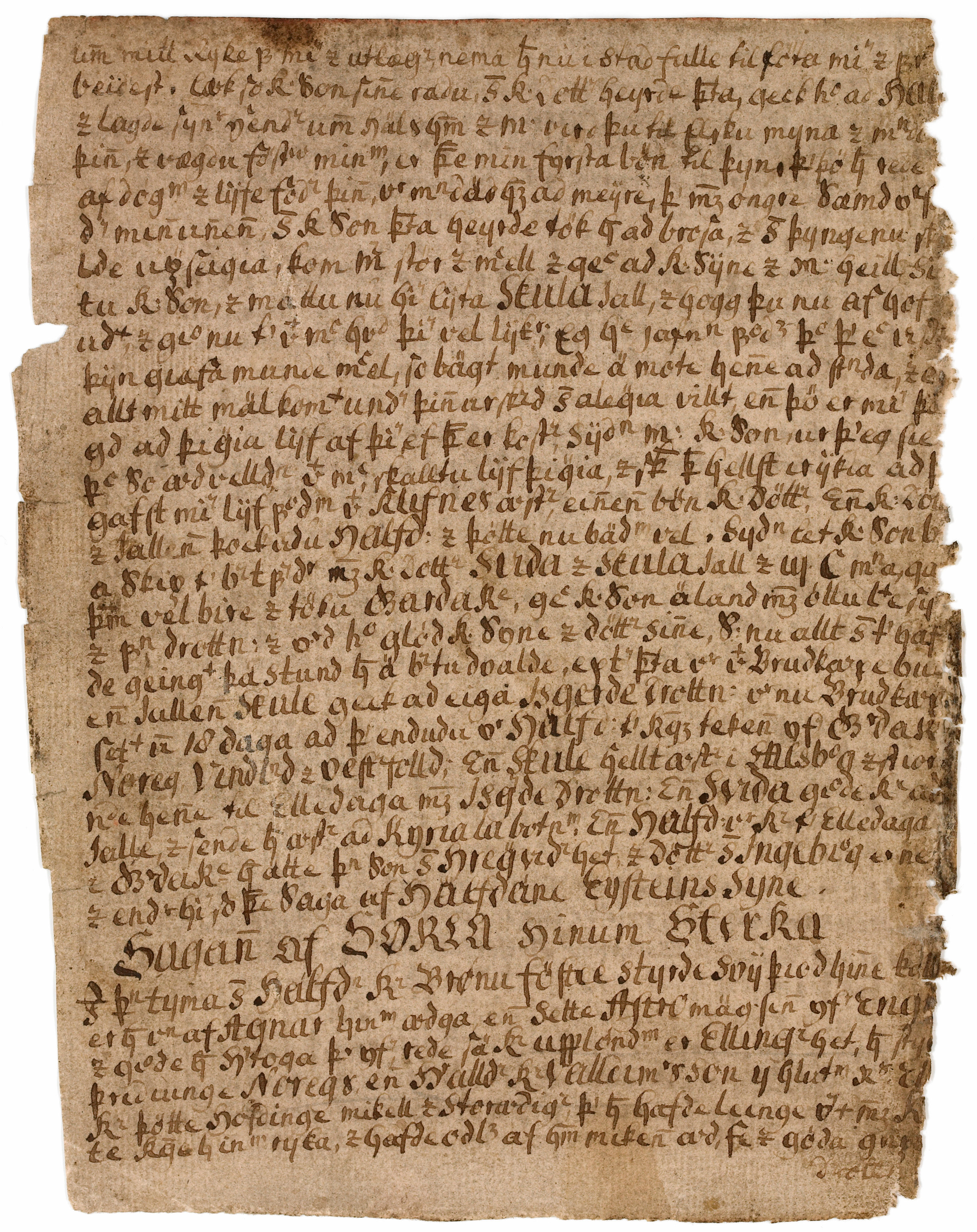
Sörla saga sterka, manuscript F. 8v of Rask 32 (18th century).

Sörla saga sterka is a legendary saga which was written in the 14th or 15th century.

It is a sequel to Hálfdanar saga Brönufóstra and like its prequel one of its locales is England, which is a vassal to Sweden. Sörli the Strong is a son of the king of Oppland, and is at feud with Halfdan Brana's Foster Son (now king of Sweden). After some adventures in Africa, which greatly resemble Halfdan's exploits in Helluland, Sörli encounters Halfdan, kills him, and takes his ship. Halfdan's son Högni (of the Hjaðningavíg) fights against him but later they become allies.

Much of the story is presented in a similar form in the midsection of Sörla þáttr.

== Translations ==
- Waggoner, Ben (2010). Sagas of Giants and Heroes. New Haven, CT: Troth Publications. ISBN 978-0578059334. (Saga of Sorli the Strong, pp. 111-140)

== Sources and external links ==
- Helpful Danes and Pagan Irishmen: Saga Fantasies of the Viking Age in the British Isles, by Elizabeth Ashman Rowe.
- The saga in Old Norse at «Norrøne Tekster og Kvad».
- The saga in Old Norse at Snerpa.
- The saga in English Translation by George L. Hardman with Facing Old Norse Texts.
