= Frá Fornjóti ok hans ættmönnum =

Frá Fornjóti ok hans ættmönnum (Old Norse for "Of Fornjót and His Kinsmen") is legendary saga consisting of a collection of three works on the foundation of Norway:

- Hversu Noregr byggðist ("How Norway was inhabited")
- Fundinn Noregr ("Foundation of Norway")
- Af Upplendinga konungum ("Of the Kings of the Uplands")
