= Skálholtsbók =

Fragmentary Icelandic saga-manuscript

Reykjavík, AM 557 4to, known as Skálholtsbók (Icelandic pronunciation: [ˈskaulˌhɔl̥(t)sˌpouːk], the Book of Skálholt), is an Icelandic saga-manuscript. It is now fragmentary: three gatherings of eight leaves and twenty individual leaves have been lost, leaving only 48 leaves. Nevertheless, it contains, in whole or in part, Valdimars saga, Gunnlaugs saga ormstungu, Hallfreðar saga vandræðaskálds, Hrafns saga Sveinbjarnarsonar, Eiríks saga rauða (complete), Rögnvalds þáttur og Rauðs (complete), Dámusta saga, Hróa þáttur heimska, Eiríks saga víðförla, Stúfs saga (complete), Karls þáttur vesæla (complete) and Sveinka þáttur. It seems likely to have been written by Ólafur Loftsson (d. c. 1458), the son of Loftur ríki Guttormsson, in the north of Iceland, around 1420.
