= Möttuls saga =

Möttuls saga or Skikkju saga (The saga of the cloak) is an Old Norse translation of Le lai du cort mantel (also known as Le mantel mautaillié), a French fabliau dating to the beginning of the 13th century. The saga tells the story of a chastity-testing cloak brought to the court of King Arthur. It was translated, along with other chivalric sagas, under the patronage of Haakon IV of Norway. Its risqué content suggests that it was translated by clerks rather than in a religious context. Möttuls saga formed the basis for a later set of Icelandic rímur called Skikkjurímur.

Complete texts of the saga date from the 17th century. However, there are indications that Möttuls saga may have been one of the earliest Arthurian texts translated into Old Norse. The saga begins with an extended introductory section, not present in the French text, that describes King Arthur. Such an introduction would have been necessary for an audience unfamiliar with the Arthur legend. The saga also misnames certain well-known characters which may also indicate unfamiliarity with the material.

The earliest medieval fragments of the saga date from the 14th century. These represent two reactions of the saga. The first survives in a single leaf, AM 598 Iβ 4to. The other is represented by Stock. Perg. 4to nr 6 and the fragment AM 598 Iα 4to which originally belonged to the same codex. Only two leaves of this codex are preserved. Kalinke's edition of the saga is based on a 17th-century copy of the manuscript (AM 179 fol).

The author of Samsons saga fagra, which gives a history of the cloak before it reaches Arthur's court, knew Möttuls saga and refers to it as Skikkju saga.

== Editions and translations ==
- Brynjúlfsson, Gísli, ed. (1878). Saga af Tristram ok Ísönd samt Möttuls saga. Copenhagen.
- Bjarni, Vilhjálmsson, ed. (1949). "Möttuls saga". Riddarasögur. Vol. 1. Reykjavík. pp. 249–281.
- Slay, Desmond, ed. (1972). "Möttuls saga". Romances: Perg. 4:o nr. 6 in the Ryal Library, Stockholm. Early Icelandic Manuscripts in Facsimile. Vol. X. Copenhagen.
- Simek, Rudolf, ed. (1982). Die Saga vom Mantwl und die Saga vom scönen Samson. Möttuls saga und Samsons saga fagra. Fabulae Medievales (in German). Vol. 2. Vienna.
- Kalinke, Marianne E., ed. (1987). Möttuls saga: with an Edition of Le Lai du cort mantel by Philip E. Bennett. Editiones Arnamagnæanæ, B. Vol. 30. Copenhagen.
- Kalinke, Marianne E., ed. (1999). "Möttuls saga". Norse Romance II: Knights of the Round Table. Woodbridge, Suffolk: D.S. Brewer. pp. 3–31. ISBN 9781843843078.

== See also ==
- Caradoc - episode of the Mantle of Chastity
- Lai du cor
- The Boy and the Mantle – Traditional song
