= Samsons saga fagra =

Samsons saga fagra (The Saga of Samson the Fair) is an Old Norse chivalric saga.

== Summary ==
Philip Lavender has summarised the saga as follows:

We are introduced to Samson, son of King Artús, who falls in love with Valentína, a princess, while she is kept as a hostage at his father's court. The saga is divided into two parts, the first of which takes place mostly in the British Isles and describes the vicissitudes of Samson's search for the lost Valentína—harassed by the rogue Kvintalín—and eventual reunion with her. The second focuses on Sigurðr, an illegitimate son of King Goðmundr of Glæsisvellir, who after being adopted by a humble couple makes his way in the world and ends up conquering and acquiring many lands through three successive marriages. This second part is linked to the first as Samson sends the chastened Kvintalín to steal a magic cloak from Sigurðr at the end of his life. Kvintalín succeeds and kills the now aged Sigurðr in the process, only to be subsequently tracked down and killed by Sigurðr's son, Úlfr. Samson, nevertheless, comes into possession of the magic cloak, and any residual animosity between the original owners and the new ones is smoothed out by a series of marriages.

== Style and intertexts ==
The saga is formed of two parts. The first is stylistically similar to other chivalric sagas. The second part, known as Sigurðar þáttr, is closer in style to late legendary sagas, but notable for its inclusion of material from a range of learned texts. Lockey writes that: "The saga's eclectic character is perhaps its most interesting feature, for it demonstrates that the author had wide access to a variety of foreign sources from which many of the motifs were culled." The saga is also notable for its intertextual reference to Möttuls saga (referred to as Skikkju saga) and its chastity testing cloak. Samsons saga fagra gives a history of the cloak before it reaches Arthur's court.

In the first part of the saga, Samson falls in love with Valentina, an Irish princess. Valentina is abducted by Kvintelin and during Samson's search for her, he fights Kvintelin's mother under a waterfall. This scene has been compared to Beowulf's fight with Grendel's mother and Grettir's fight with Glámr in Grettis saga Ásmundarsonar.

== Manuscripts ==
The saga is preserved complete in only one medieval manuscript, AM 343a 4to which dates to the fifteenth century. The oldest manuscript of the saga, also from the fifteenth century, is AM 589b 4to, which survives as two fragments. There are around forty post-medieval manuscripts of the saga, which indicate its continuing popularity in Iceland.

== Bibliography ==
=== Editions ===
- Vilhjálmsson, Bjarni. Riddarasögur. Vol. 3. Reykjavík: Íslendingasagnaútgáfan Haukadalsútgáfan.
- Wilson, John (1953). Samsons saga fagra. Samfund til udgivelse af gammel nordisk litteratur. Vol. 65. Copenhagen.
- Lockey, Mary L. R. (1979). An Edition of Samsons Saga Fagra (Ph.D). University of Birmingham (unpublished PhD thesis).

=== Translations ===
- Waggoner, Ben (2018). "The Saga of Samson the Fair: Samsons saga fagra". Sagas of Imagination: A Medieval Icelandic Reader. Philadelphia, Pennsylvania: The Troth. pp. 253–284. ISBN 978-1-941136-17-1.
