= Dámusta saga =

Damusta saga ('the saga of Dámusti', also known as Dámusta saga ok Jóns, Saga spekingsins Dámusta i Gricklandi) is a medieval Icelandic romance saga. It is noted for its inventive engagement with Continental romance-writing traditions.

== Synopsis ==
Kalinke and Mitchell summarise the saga thus:

Dámusti is a pious knight at the court of King Katalaktus of Grikkland. When the king's daughter, Gratiana, marries King Jón of Smáland, Dámusti kills Jón out of jealousy. Gratiana becomes fatally ill. The Virgin Mary appears to the repentant Dámusti, tells him to arm himself and ride to the church where Gratiana lies buried. There Dámusti defeats the giant Alheimr who reveals that he had induced Gratiana's apparent death in order to marry her himself. Alheimr gives Dámusti a potion which will revive Gratiana. Katalaktus forgives Damusti and the knight marries Gratiana. When their son is old enough to rule, Damusti and Gratiana turn to the spiritual life and become hermits.

== Manuscripts ==
Kalinke and Mitchell identified the following manuscripts of the saga:

- Arnamagnæan Institute, Copenhagen: AM 557, 4° (15th c), vellum, 3 lvs.; AM 588e, 4° (ca. 1700); Rask 32 (late 18th c).
- Royal Library, Copenhagen: NKS 1144, fol. (18th c), resume; Kall 613, 4° (1751).
- The British Library, London: Add. 4874, 4° (ca. 1773).
- National Library, Reykjavik: Lbs 661, 4° (1843-48); JS 27, fol. (ca. 1670); IB 116, 4° (1786-1805); IB 201, 4° (ca. 1821).
- National Museum, Reykjavik: Ásbúðarsafn: Sögubók (18th c.).
- Royal Norwegian Society of Sciences and Letters, Trondheim: *DKNVSB 5b fol. (late 18th c.).
- University Library, Lund: LUB 14, 4° (mid-18th c).
- Royal Library, Stockholm: Papp. fol. nr 1 (early 17th c); Papp. fol. nr 66 (1690); Papp. 4:o nr 17 (1671); *Papp. fol. nr 96 (early 18th c), excerpt.
- Beinecke Library, Yale University: Z 113.85 (19th c). Contains copy of AM 557, 4° and a complete text of the saga based on Rask 32, 4° and Kall 613, 4°.

== Editions and translations ==
- Tan-Haverhorst, Louisa Fredrika, ed. "Dámusta saga." In Þjalar Jóns saga. Dámustasaga. I. Teksten. Diss. Leiden. (Haarlem: H. D. Tjeenk Willink & Zoon, 1939), pp. 48-108. Based on JS 27 fol.
- "Dámusta saga." In The Arna-Magnæan Manuscript 557 4to containing inter alia the History of the first Discovery of America, ed. by Dag Strömbäck. Copenhagen: Munksgaard, 1940. Facsimile of leaves 38r-40v. (Corpus Codicum Islandicorum Medii Aevi, XIII).
