= The Boy and the Mantle =

Traditional song

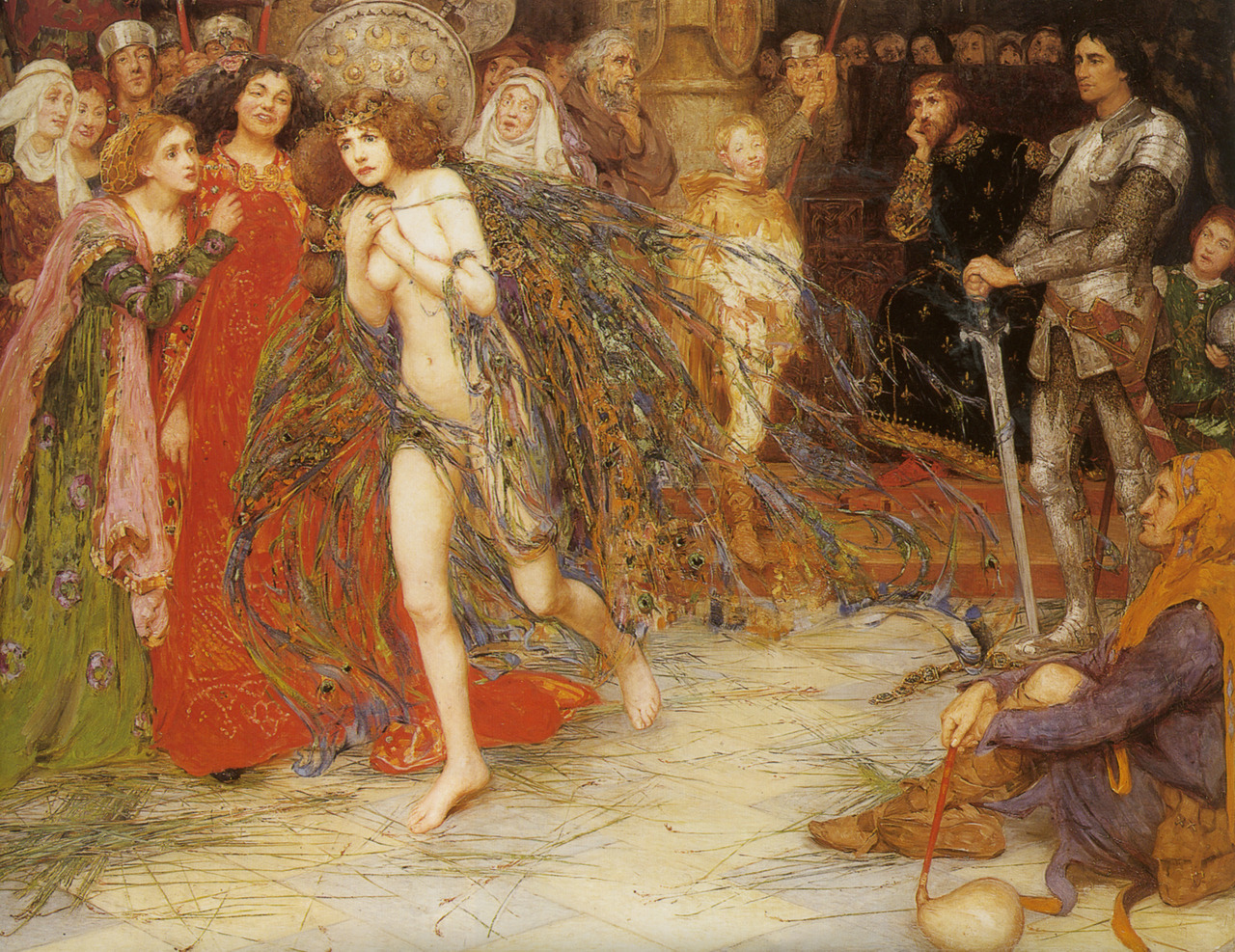
The Magic Mantle, by Isobel Lilian Gloag, 1898.

"The Boy and the Mantle" (Roud 3961, Child 29) is an Arthurian folk ballad. Unlike the ballads before it, and like "King Arthur and King Cornwall" and "The Marriage of Sir Gawain" immediately after it in the Francis James Child collection, this is not a folk ballad but a song from professional minstrels.

== Synopsis ==
A boy comes to King Arthur's court with an enchanted mantle that can not be worn by an unfaithful wife. Guinevere dons it, but appears to be naked:

When she had tane the mantle,
and cast it her about,
Then was shee bare
all aboue the buttocckes.
Then euery knight
that was in the kings court
Talked, laughed, and showted,
full oft att that sport.

So does every other lady in the court; only one can wear it, and only after she confesses to kissing her husband before their marriage. Other boys also bring a wild boar, that can not be cut by a cuckold's knife, and a cup that a cuckold can not drink from without spilling it, and these also reveal that every wife at court has been unfaithful.

== Motifs ==
The magical test of fidelity which virtually every woman fails is a common motif, being found first in fabliau and romances, such as The Faerie Queene, where Florimel's girdle fits the pattern, and Amadis of Gaul, where no one unfaithful to his or her first love can pass an archway.

== See also ==
- List of the Child Ballads
- Caradoc
- Möttuls saga
