= King of the Geats =

English translation of both a Latin phrase and a Swedish phrase

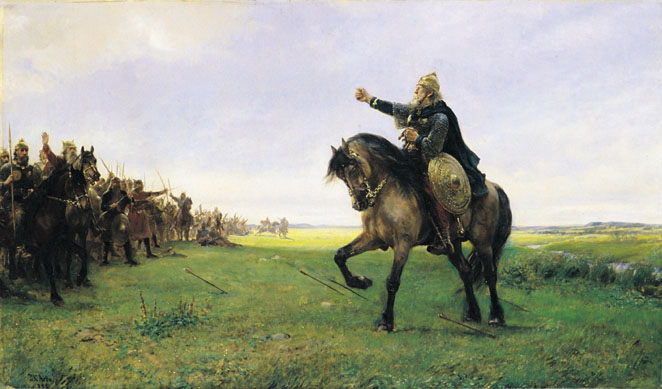
Gizur challenges the Huns Peter Nicolai Arbo (1886)

Geatish kings (Latin: Rex Getarum/Gothorum; Swedish: Götakungar), ruling over the provinces of Götaland (Gautland/Geatland), appear in several sources for early Swedish history. Today, most of them are not considered historical.

This list follows the generally accepted identification between the names Götar (modern Swedish), Gautar (Old Norse) and Geatas (Old English), which is based both on tradition, literary sources and on etymology. However, unlike some translations it does not identify this tribe with the Goths. Both Old Norse and Old English records clearly separate the Geats from the Goths, while still depicting them as closely related to each other.

From the Middle Ages until 1973, Swedish monarchs claimed the title King of the Geats as "King of Sweden and Geats/Goths" or "Rex Sweorum et Gothorum". Danish monarchs used the similar title "King of the Goths" from 1362 until 1972.

== Legendary kings ==
Some names appear in Norse mythology and in Germanic legend and in at least one case, they were probably historical (Hygelac). Their order of succession is uncertain (if they ever lived).

- Dag, contemporary with Yngvi-Frey in Gamla Uppsala, in Sturlaugs saga 19 & 23.
- Gizur 4th century, who helps the Goths during the battles with the Huns in Hervarar saga (see Hlöd).
- Gauti (in Herraud's saga), probably the same as Gaut the father of Gautrek according to the Ynglinga saga. See Sons of Odin.
- Ring son of Gauti (king of East Götaland in Bósa saga ok Herrauds)
- Herrauðr, son of Ring (king of East Götaland in Bósa saga ok Herrauds)
- Gautrekr, appearing in several sources.
- Ketill Gautreksson, in Hrólfs saga Gautrekssonar.
- Hrólfr Gautreksson, in Hrólfs saga Gautrekssonar.
- Gestiblindus, according to Gesta Danorum.
- Yngwin ("Yngve") 5th century (in Gesta Danorum, see Halfdan)
- Siward, contemporary with Yngwin's grandson (in Gesta Danorum)
- Algaut 4th century or the 7th century (in the Norse sagas)
- Thorir (the brother of Bödvar Bjarki and Elgfróði in Hrólfs saga kraka)

=== Siklings ===
- Sigar?, the father of Siggeir, who genealogically corresponds to Yngwin, the king of Götaland in Gesta Danorum.
- Siggeir 5th century, a son of Sigar and the king of Götaland in the Volsunga saga

=== Hrethelings ===
Beowulf's author uses the term 'Hreþling' referring to the descendants of Hreðel and to Hygelac in particular

- Swerting (in Beowulf).
- Hreðel (a relative of Swerting, in Beowulf) (nephew, grandson or stepson)
- Hæþcyn d. 514 or 515 (the son of Hrethel, in Beowulf)
- Hygelac d. 516 (the son of Hrethel, in Beowulf)
- Heardred d. ca 530 (the son of Hygelac, in Beowulf)
- Beowulf d. ca 580? (the nephew of Hygelac, in Beowulf)
- Wiglaf (the kinsman of Beowulf, in Beowulf)

The Hrethlings (Kings of the Geats), according to Beowulf

Swerting (Note: The relationship between Swerting and Hreðel is not clear from the poem. He may also have been his father, or his brother-in-law.)
daughter	Hreðel ♕	Hæreð
Herebeald	Hæþcyn ♕	Hygelac ♕	Hygd	daughter	Ecgþeow
Heardred ♕	daughter	Eofor	Beowulf ♕

=== Ylfings (Wulfings) ===
Kings of East Götaland

- Helm Early 6th century, the Wulfing king mentioned in Widsith. Possible Reign Date Range 475–530.
- Högne 7th century, the king of East Götaland (in the Heimskringla) and the father-in-law of Granmar. Most likely descendant of Helm.
- Hjörvard 7th century, king of East Götaland (in Sögubrot) Married Hildagun daughter of Granmer. Most likely descendant of Helm.
- Helgi Ylfing 7th century, probably a king of East Götaland in the Norse sagas and son-in-law of Högne. If we separate the merged Helgi into two time frames periods. He is recorded as the killer of Hogne and his sons and also Granmers son's.
- Hjörmund 7th century, king of East Götaland (in Sögubrot) and a son of Hjörvard. He was most likely grandson of Högne. Given the throne by Ivar Harold Wartooths grandfather.

=== Battle of Bråvalla ===
Chronologically assigned to the 8th century, but poorly attested historically, the Battle of Bråvalla (in a location legendarily between West and East Götaland) was fought between the "King of Sweden" (Sigurd Hring) who is said to have ruled West Götaland, and the "King of Denmark" (Harald Wartooth) whose realm is said to have included East Götaland.

== Historical kings ==
When sources become more reliable, Götaland is an integrated part of the Swedish kingdom and from Stenkil and onwards most of the medieval Swedish kings actually belonged to Geatish clans (House of Stenkil, House of Sverker and the House of Bjälbo, possibly also the House of Erik). In the early High Middle Ages some kings in Sweden were titled rex Visigothorum and rex Gothorum, failing to hold the Swedish core provinces in Svealand. The non-Geatish King Ragnvald Knaphövde was killed by the Geats as he despised them and travelled among them without Geatish hostages.

- Ingold I, king of West Götaland (1081)
- Halsten, king of West Götaland (1081)
- Magnus the Strong, king of West Götaland (reigned 1125–1130)
- Kol, king of East Götaland (see Inge the Younger) (early 12th century)
- Karl Sverkersson, rex Gothorum before becoming king of all of Sweden.
- From the reign of King Magnus Ladulås until the accession of Charles XVI Gustav, Sweden's monarchs were officially titled "King of the Goths". Similarly, from Valdemar IV's conquest of Gotland until the accession of Margrethe II, Denmark's monarchs held the same title.

== False kings ==
- The 16th-century forgery Ballad of Eric tells of the first king of Götaland Eric ("Eiriker"), who for a long time was considered historical.
