= Isobel Lilian Gloag =

English painter (1865–1917)

- Born: 1 August 1865; London, England
- Died: 5 January 1917 (aged 51); London, England
- Known for: Painting

Isobel Lilian Gloag (1 August 1865 – 5 January 1917) was an English painter of the Victorian era, known for her oil and watercolour portraits, as well as posters and stained-glass designs.

== Biography ==
Gloag was born on 1 August 1865 in London, the daughter of Scottish parents from Perthshire. Her early studies were made at St. John's Wood Art School, and she later studied at the Slade School of Fine Art.

Ill health compelled her to put aside plans for regular study and she entered the studio of M.W. Ridley's for private instruction, following that with work at the South Kensington Museum. After further study with Raphaël Collin in Paris, she returned to London and soon had her work accepted at the Royal Academy of Arts, where she exhibited a total of 19 works.

Gloag was an elected member of the Royal Institute of Oil Painters and the New Society of Painters in Water-Colours. Her earlier works were inspired by the Pre-Raphaelites, while later works were more modern, and her works have been cited as examples of post-Victorian Aestheticism. She made several designs for the stained-glass artist Mary Lowndes.

Suffering from health problems throughout her life, she died in London on 5 January 1917, aged 51. Her work was posthumously featured in an exhibition at the Grafton Galleries, London.

Selected works

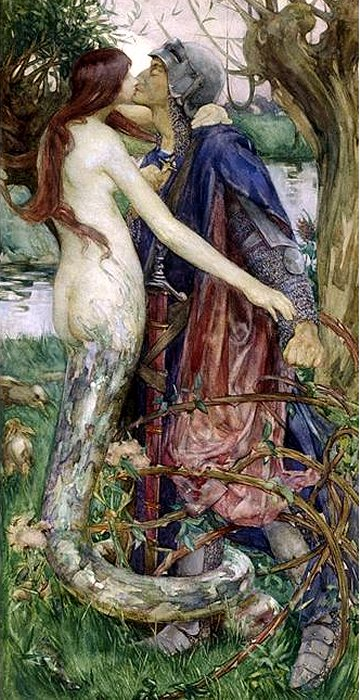
The Kiss of the Enchantress (ca. 1890)

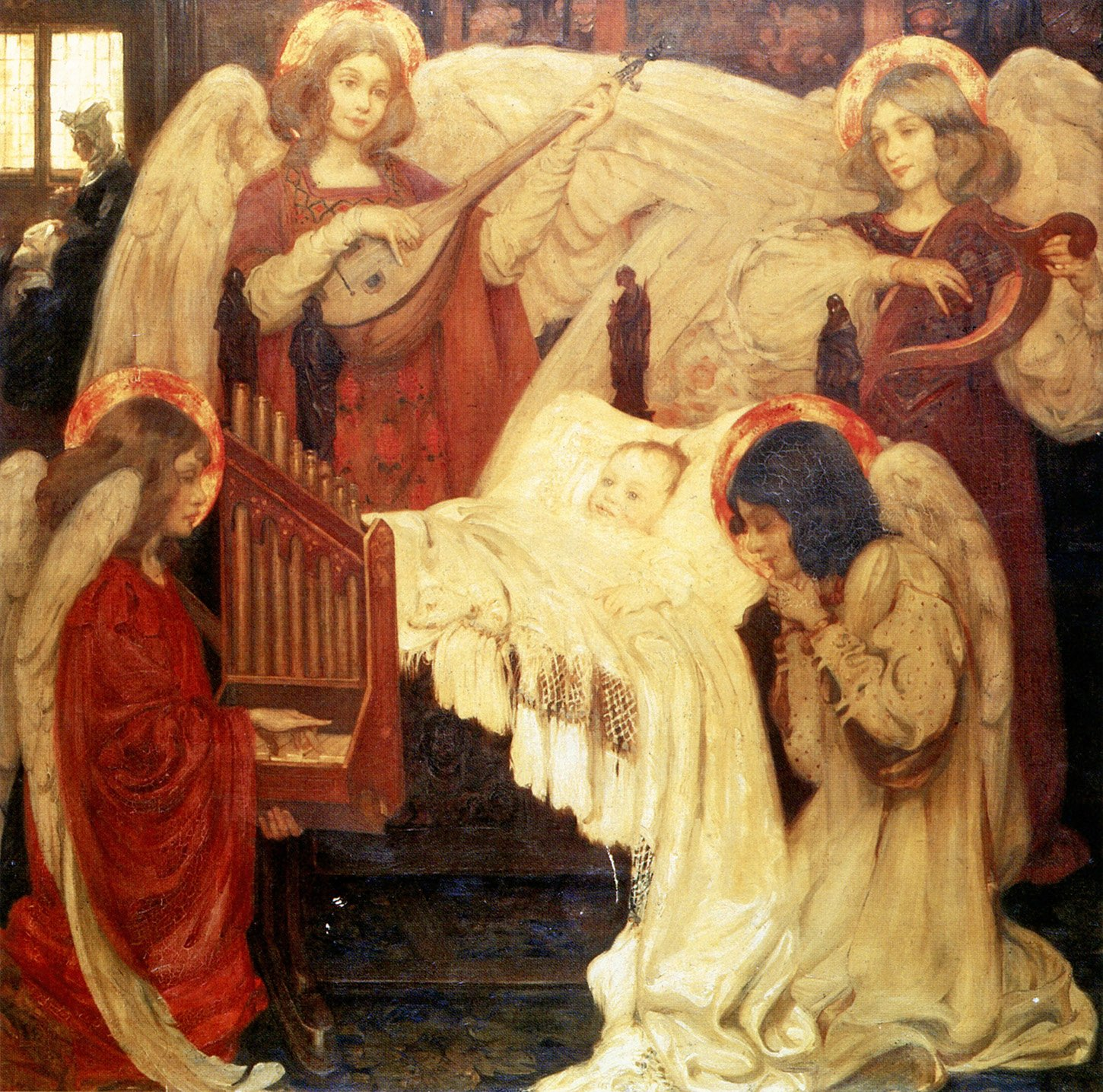
Four corners to my bed... (ca. 1901)

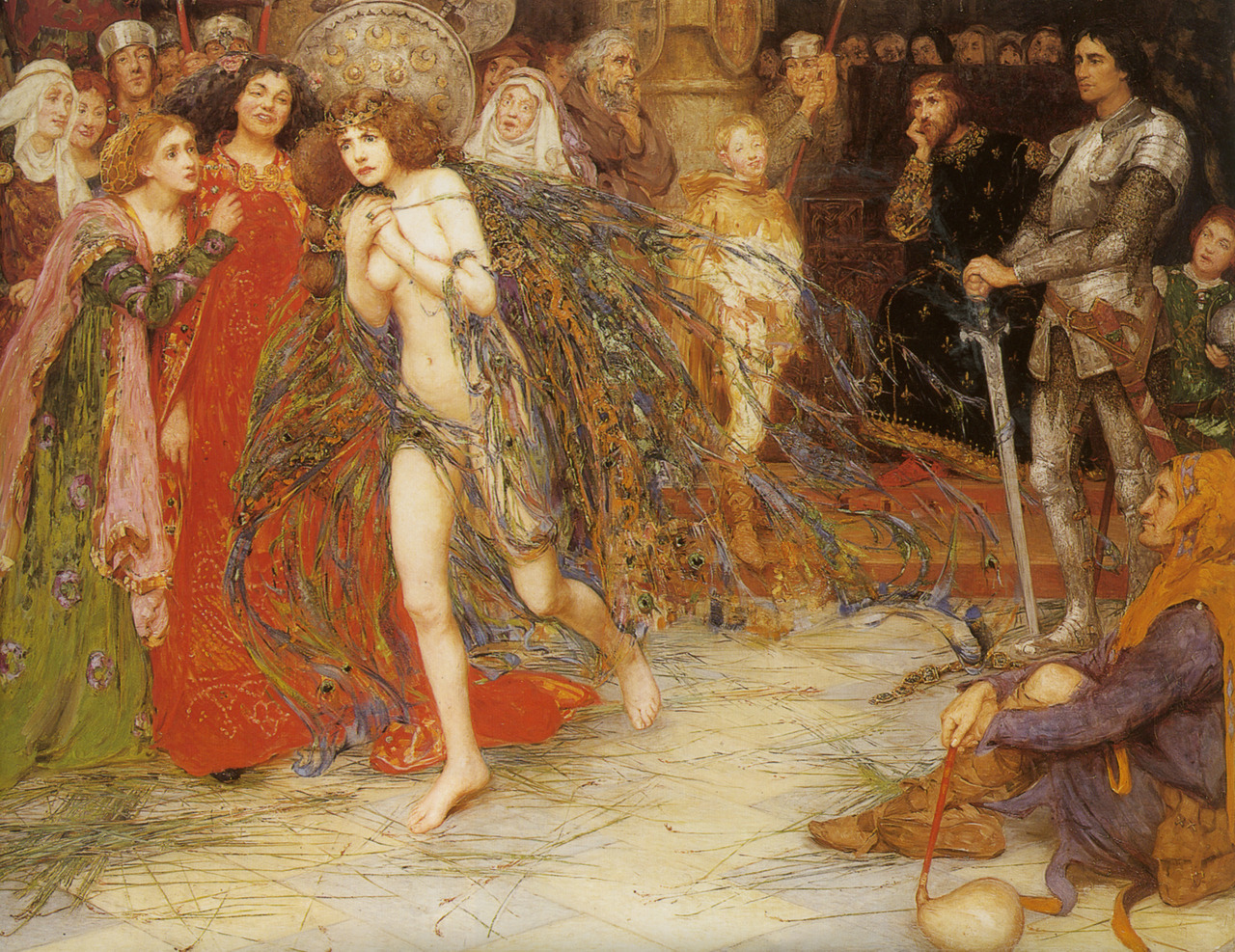
The Magic Mantle (1898), based on The Boy and the Mantle

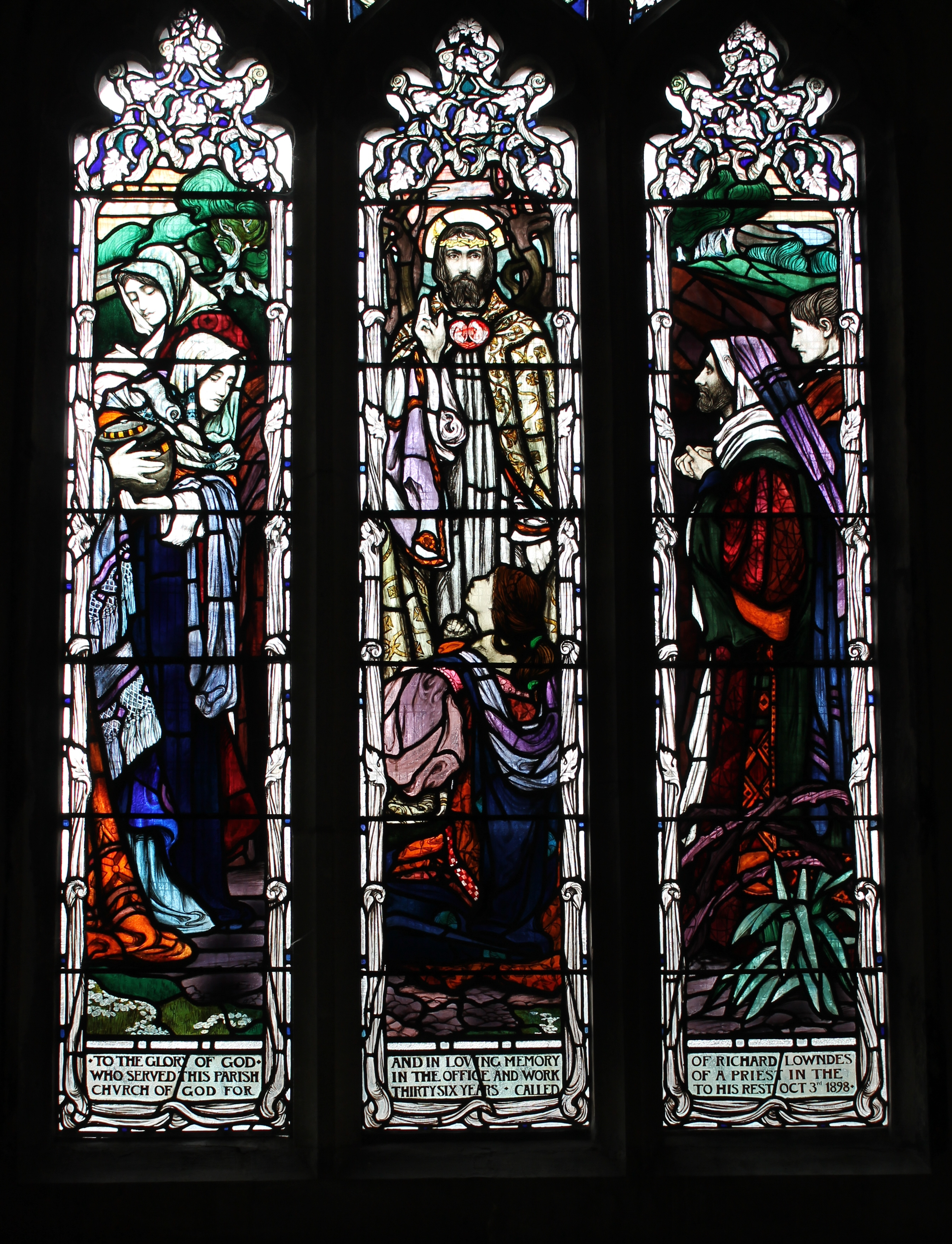
Stained-glass design at St Mary's Church, Sturminster Newton
