= Helga þáttr Þórissonar =

Legendary saga

Helga þáttr Þórissonar is a þáttr or short legendary saga found within the Saga of Ólaf Tryggvason in the Flateyjarbók.

== Plot ==
On the way back from a trading voyage to Finnmark with his brother, Helgi Þórisson becomes lost in a foggy wood and meets Ingibjörg, daughter of King Godmund of Glæsisvellir, and her retinue of 11 women, all wearing red and riding red horses. He sleeps with her for three nights, and as a parting gift she gives him a chest full of gold and another full of silver, but warns him that he must tell no one where they came from. Returning home to Norway, where the brothers live with their father, Þórir, near the Oslofjord, Helgi spends some of the money decorating his and his brother's ship, and hides the rest in its dragon-prow. The following Christmas, a great gale comes up and the brothers are afraid for their ship; checking on it, Helgi is carried off by two men who suddenly appear with a great crash. Þórir informs King Ólaf Tryggvason.

On the eighth day of Christmas the following year, the king and his court are at Alreksstaðir when three men come into the hall. One is Helgi; the others both call themselves Grim and say they have been sent by King Godmund to bring him two magnificent drinking horns, also called Grim, as a sign of his respect and hope of friendship. King Ólaf judges them even better than the pair he already owns, called the Hyrnings. He has them filled with ale and blessed by a bishop. When they are brought to the two strangers, they realise they have been blessed, spill the ale, turn out the lights, and leave with a great crash. When light is restored, all three men are gone and three of Ólaf's men are dead with the two horns beside them. The king says he has been told King Godmund is a dangerous sorcerer, and orders the horns kept and used.

After another year, it is once more the eighth day of Christmas; when King Ólaf is attending mass, two men come to the church door and leave a third, referring to him as a skeleton. This is Helgi, and he is now blind; he tells King Ólaf that the Grims had intended to fool and harm the king on King Godmund's orders, but had been unable to because of the blessing, and that King Godmund had now let him go because of King Ólaf's prayers; Ingibjörg had felt uneasy touching his naked body. Although Helgi had been happier at King Godmund's court than anywhere else, Ingibjörg had gouged his eyes out on parting, saying the women of Norway would not now have much pleasure from him. He remains with King Ólaf for the rest of his life, exactly one year, and the king has the two horns with him when he dies at the Battle of Svolder.

== Literary context ==
The þáttr is thought to have been already present in the immediate source used by the compiler, Jón Þórðarson.

Like other legendary sagas and þættir, the story should be seen in the context of European ballad and romance. It has been compared to the ballad of "Thomas the Rhymer", and appears to have been influenced by Marie de France's lai Lanval, either directly from the French or via the Norwegian translation, Januals ljóð. Like other legendary sagas, it combines remote fantasy places, in this case Glæsisvellir, with known places; the description of the environs of Alreksstaðir suggests local knowledge.

It has also been classified as a conversion þáttr, one of those dealing with either the conversion of Scandinavia to Christianity or with the contrast between Christian times and heathen times. Godmund, who varies in characterisation in different Old Norse works, is here "the enemy of the virtuous Christian King Olaf".
