= Jumala =

Finnish religious term

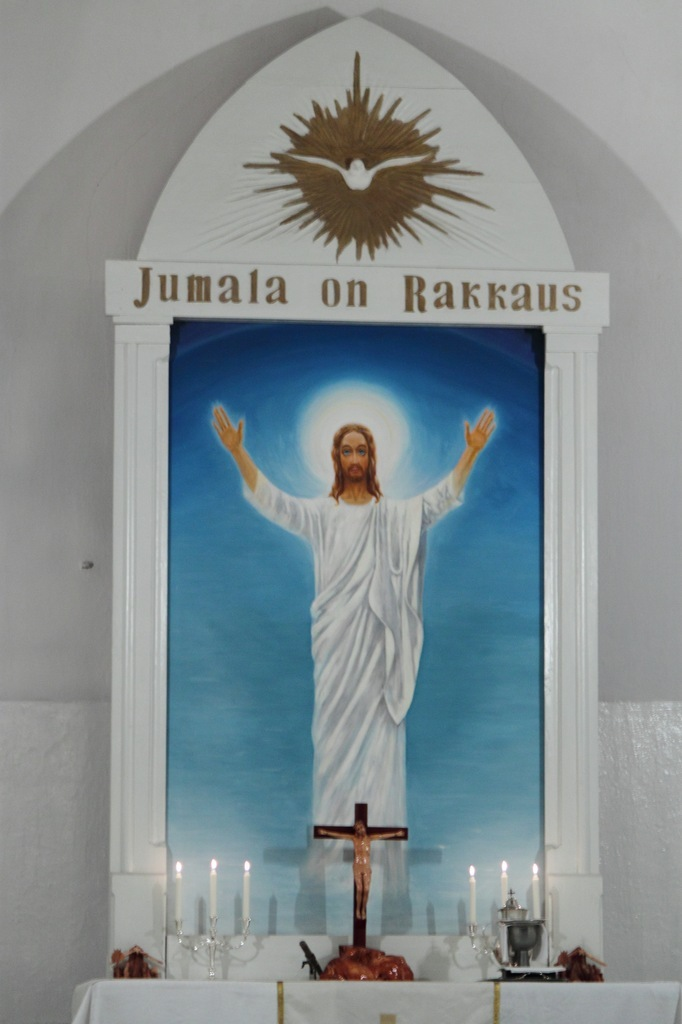
The word Jumala as the name of God in a Finnish Lutheran church in Russia (Jumala on Rakkaus – lit. 'God is love')

Jumala (Finnish: [ˈjumɑlɑ]), Jumal (Estonian: [ˈjumɑl]) or Jumo (Mari) means 'god' in the Finnic languages and those of the Volga Finns (Mari, Erzya and Moksha languages), both the Christian God and any other deity of any religion. The word is thought to have been the name of a sky god of the ancient Finnic-speaking peoples. Jumala as a god of the sky is associated with the related Estonian Jumal, Mari Jumo and is thought to stem from an ancient tradition of the Finno-Ugric peoples.

== Etymology ==
The Finnic and Mari terms for 'god' are usually considered to derive from a common Finno-Permic root *juma. Related terms have been proposed to be found also in the Mordvinic languages: ёндол /jondol/ 'lightning', interpretable as an old compound meaning 'fire of Juma' (cf. тол /tol/ 'fire'). A single 17th-century source on Mordvinic moreover mentions Jumishipas as the name of a pre-Christian deity. The exact meaning of this however remains unclear (cf. ши /ʃi/ 'sun', пас /pas/ 'god').

There are different theories concerning the earlier origin of the word. An Indo-Iranian origin for the name has been proposed, comparing e.g. Sanskrit dyumān 'heavenly, shining', accepted in some sources but disputed in others due to the inexact meaning. A different possible origin is Baltic languages (cf. Jumis – Latvian god of the evergreen Otherworld, and his sister/wife Jumala).

This name replaced the original Finno-Ugric word for 'heaven' (*ilma), which is preserved in the Sámi and Permic languages but whose meaning was shifted to 'air' in Finnic. The older sense remains in the Finnish divine name Ilmarinen.

No certain equivalents are found in the Ugric languages, though a minority view proposes a connection with words meaning 'good', such as Hungarian jó, Northern Mansi ёмас /jomas/. The source of these words has been reconstructed as *jomV rather than *juma.

== Jumal ==
In Estonia, Jumal was the name of the god of the sky. He was believed to make the earth fertile through the rains of the summer's thunderstorms. Among the south Estonians, he was represented by a wooden statue in their homes.

In Finland, Jumala was the name of two of the Finns' sky gods, or one of two names for the sky god (cf. Ilmarinen).

According to John Martin Crawford in the preface to his translation of the Kalevala:

The Finnish deities, like the ancient gods of Italy, Greece, Egypt, Vedic India or any ancient cosmogony, are generally represented in pairs, and all the gods are probably wedded. They have their individual abodes and are surrounded by their respective families. ... The heavens themselves were thought divine. Then a personal deity of the heavens, coupled with the name of his abode, was the next conception; finally this sky-god was chosen to represent the supreme Ruler. To the sky, the sky-god, and the supreme God, the term Jumala (thunder-home) was given.

Later on, the sky itself was called taivas and the sky-god Ukko Ylijumala, literally Grandfather or Old Man Overgod. However, when Christianity came to dominate Finnish religious life in the Middle Ages and the old gods were ousted or consolidated away from the pantheon, Jumala became the Finnish name for the Christian God.

== Jómali ==
Two Old Norse texts mention a god called Jómali, worshipped in Bjarmaland: Óláfs saga helga chapter 133 and Bósa saga chapters 8-10. The attestation in Bósa saga is probably borrowed from the earlier Óláfs saga. The name of this god is generally assumed to be a loanword from a Finnic language.

== See also ==
- Birch bark letter no. 292 (Jumala used twice in the text)
- Ukko
- Svarga, the abode of Indra, the thunder deity.

== Sources ==
- Nationalencyklopedin
