= Egils saga einhenda ok Ásmundar berserkjabana =

Legendary saga

Egils saga einhenda ok Ásmundar berserkjabana, or The Story of Egil One-Hand and Asmund Berserkers-Slayer, is a legendary saga set in Russia (Rússía), a country located between Garðaríki and Húnaland, the land of the Huns. There are also adventures in Hálógaland and Jötunheimar, the realm of giants (Jötnar). Ásmundr is also known as Gnoðar-Ásmundr and under this name he is mentioned in various other sagas. His foster-father is Illugi, who has a saga of his own in Illuga saga Gríðarfóstra.

== Manuscripts and dating ==
The saga is believed to have been written down in the 14th century. It is known through Icelandic manuscripts, the oldest attested ones from the early 15th century. Its first printed edition was published by the Swedish scholar Petter Salan in 1693, under the title Fortissimorum pugilum Egilli et Asmundi historiam antqvo gothico sermone exaratam.

== Summary ==
In the assessment of Finnur Jónsson "er sagaen ret underholdende fortalt og i sin gang ret simpel" ("the saga is quite entertainingly told and quite simple in its way").

The protagonists of the saga are Ásmundr berserkjabani ("slayer of berserks"), a son of Óttarr, king of Hålogaland, Egill einhendi ("one-armed"), a son of King Hringr in Småland. The story begins during the protagonists' adulthood; after fighting one another, they become each other's foster brother. But the story of their youth is later introduced via their own account of themselves, given in the abode of a giantess. One of the sub-tales of the saga concerns King Róðíán of Tartary and his son Árán, who becomes Ásmundr's foster-brother and with whom Ásmundr sits for some days after Árán has been interred in a burial mound. Meanwhile, Egill's story echoes the legend of Polyphemos.

King Hertryggr in Russia has two daughters, Brynhildr and Bekkhildr, who are both abducted by giants. The foster brothers set out to look for them, and face a series of perilous adventures and journeys. They are lucky enough to meet a giantess who helps them because, as it turns out, Egill once assisted her. She has been looking after and preserving Egill's severed arm: the giantess returns it to him and reattaches it to his body. The foster brothers save the royal daughters and marry them.
