= Eireks saga víðförla =

Norse legendary saga

Eireks Saga Víðförla is a legendary saga about a Norwegian, Eric the Traveller. He travels to Miklagard, modern Istanbul, with Eric the Dane. There he interacts with a King, possibly the Eastern Roman Emperor, who informs him on Christianity and Údáinsakr. After a period of study he then journeys to India and beyond in search of Údáinsakr (the Deathless Acre), and returns. Modern analysis have concluded that the place mentioned is likely in modern Yemen at Aden. This version of the epic was transcribed almost 400 years after the facts reported. This telling merges the Údáinsakr of Norse mythology with the notion of heaven in Christianity to create a theological bridge between the belief systems. The lone source on the Life of Eric the Traveller is the Icelandic manuscript Skálholtsbók.
