= Hrólfs saga Gautrekssonar =

Hrólfs saga Gautrekssonar is a Scandinavian legendary saga which was put to text in Iceland in the 13th century. It has a prequel in Gautreks saga.

== Summary ==
Gautrekr was a Geatish king who descended from Odin himself. He lost his wife Alfhild and went somewhat out of his mind, ignored all matters of state, and spent all his time on Alfhild's burial mound, flying his hawk.

He had two sons Ketill and Hrólfr Gautreksson, and Ketill became a great Viking who inherited his father's kingdom.

In Uppsala ruled Erik, the king of Sweden, who had only had one child, Þornbjörg, born a daughter. She was a ruler who would rather fight and act manly - to Erik's disdain. She also called herself by the masculine-associated name Þórbergr, and insisted on not being referred to as a virgin or as womanly. She is called a few times throughout the saga Þórbergr konungr, king Thorberg. Throughout the saga it does keep referring to her as female and as queen, however. Þorbjörg's father gave her the royal estate of Ulleråker, where she kept a retinue of housecarls.

Ketill suggested that Hrólfr make a try to woo the queen and after much hesitation, Hrólfr agreed. His brother said that "it would be the most noble marriage in the Northlands to have the daughter of the king at Uppsala for wife" and "many have little courage in a big body and it is a shame that you who are a man durst not speak to womenfolk".

Hrólfr summoned his courage and went to Ulleråker with his fosterbrother Ingjald of Denmark and sixty well-armed warriors to woo Thorbjörg.

Þorbjörg was sitting on the throne, dressed in armor. When Hrólfr proposed, she rushed up, grabbed her weapons and ordered his men to "fetch and bind the fool who offended king Þórbergr". Hrólfr put on his helmet and asked his housecarls to leave and then he manfully slew no less than twelve of Þorbjörg's champions before he had to flee the overwhelming foe. Everybody in his company returned to Geatland alive.

After a Viking campaign in the West to both Scotland and Brittany, Hrólfr steered his fleet of six ships and a selected crew northwards and did not stop until he reached Uppsala. When the new peace agreement between Hrólfr and king Erik had been established, Hrólf went to Ulleråker to propose once more to the queen.

Þorbjörg screamed that she'd become a shepherd in Geatland before he had any power over her. After a hard fight Þorbjörg was captured and eventually she fell in love with Hrólf son of Gautrek and agreed to marry him, at which point she gave up her weapons to her father King Eirík and took up embroidery.

After some time Hrólfr succeeded his brother Ketill as the king of the Geats, but that story was not recorded.

According to a Swedish tradition, he is buried in Bälinge near Alingsås on Rolfsborg on Rolf's hill. .

== Editions and translations ==
- Six Sagas of Adventure, trans. by Ben Waggoner (New Haven, CT: Troth Publications, 2014).
- Hrolf Gautreksson: A Viking Romance, trans. by Hermann Pálsson and Paul Edwards (Edinburgh: Southside, 1972).
- Fornaldarsögur Norðurlanda, ed. by Bjarni Vilhjálmsson and Guðni Jónsson (Reykjavík, 1943-1944), vol. 3, 43-151.
- The original text at Snerpa.
