= Bósa saga ok Herrauðs =

Saga

Bósa saga ok Herrauds or Saga of Bósi and Herraud is a legendary saga, relating the fantastic adventures of the two companions Herraud (Old Norse Herrauðr) and Bósi. It is first attested in three manuscripts from the 15th century, AM 343 a 4to, AM 577 4to, and AM 586 4to.

== Summary ==
This summary recounts the story of the older of the two main recensions of Bósa saga, which is the one that is usually edited and translated.

=== The setup ===
The story begins with King Hring (Hringr) of Östergötland, who is said to be son of King Gauti son of King Odin of Sweden and half-brother to King Gautrekr the Generous, who appears as king of Västergötland in Gautreks saga. But chronology is flattened so that Hring is made a contemporary of Harald Wartooth, King of Denmark and Sweden. Hring's wife is Sylgja daughter of Jarl Sæfara ('Seafarer') of Småland. Sæfara also has two sons, named Dagfari ("Dayfarer") and Náttfari ("Nightfarer"), who serve King Harald.

Herraud, the primary hero of the saga, is the son of Hring and his wife Sylgja. But Hring also has an illegitimate son named Sjód (Sjóðr), who serves as Hring's treasurer and tax collector and from whose name, according to the saga, the word sjóðr ("purse") derives. Hring prefers Sjód to Herraud.

Herraud's best friend is Bósi, the younger son of a former viking named Thvari or Bryn-Thvari by Brynhild, a former shieldmaiden and a daughter of King Agnar of Nóatún. (Thvari had formerly partially maimed Brynhild in a duel, whence she was known as Bögu-Brynhild "Stunt-Brynhild", for she never fully recovered. Thvari then married Brynhild, who bore him two sons, Smid (Smiðr) and Bósi. Smid learned some magic from their foster mother Busla, who was a powerful sorceress.) Bósi is sometimes called Bögu-Bósi after his mother.

Bósi is a rough boy who is eventually outlawed for maiming some other folk in a ball-game. Herraud, discontented, gains permission from his father, over Sjód's objections, be allowed to set off on a Viking expedition with five ships. Herraud is eventually joined by the exiled Bósi and they successfully plunder for five years. Meanwhile, back in East Götaland, Herraud's half-brother Sjód extorts funds from Bósi's father Thvari under the pretence that this is legal compensation for those men whom Bósi has injured. Now it chances that Bósi's ship was driven to Wendland, where Sjód happens to be on a purchasing expedition for King Hring. Bósi and Sjód quarrel over the matter and Bósi kills Sjód.

Herraud then returns to his father's court, offering to make compensation for Sjód's death; but King Hring refuses all offers. Civil war breaks out between father and son. Hring manages to capture Herraud and Bósi and prepares to execute them. But that night Busla, Bósi's foster-mother, noted for her magic powers, appears suddenly in King Hring's bedchamber, and harasses the king with a curses known as Buslubæn ('Busla's prayer') until the helpless king agrees to make peace with Herraud and Bósi to the extent of sending them on a dangerous quest instead of executing them.

=== The quest ===
The following day Hring exiles both Herraud and Bósi, Herraud for life and Bósi the same unless Bósi can find and bring back a vulture's egg inscribed with golden letters.

The two head off to Bjarmaland and have many adventures. An erotic encounter between Bósi and a farmer's daughter is told in amusingly explicit riddling dialogue. The two companions are able to kill a vulture that guards the temple of Jomali in Bjarmaland, obtaining its egg; they slay the priestess Kolfrosta, the mother of King Harek of Bjarmaland; and they rescue Hleid (Hleið), the sister of King Godmund (Guðmundr) of Glæsisvellir, who has been magically brought there to be turned into the new priestess. Herraud takes Hleid as his wife and they and Bósi return to East Götaland where King Hring, on receiving the shell of the vulture's egg, is reconciled with Bósi and his son.

=== Further adventures ===
At that point Herraud and Bósi head off to aid King Harald in the famous Battle of Bråvalla and are among the few survivors.

Meanwhile, King Godmund of Glæsisvellir, not knowing what has become of his sister Hleid, promises Siggeir, son of King Harek of Bjarmaland, that Siggeir can have her as his wife if he can find her. Siggeir and his brother Hrærek learn about Hleid's abduction from Bjarmaland by Herraud and Bósi and their destruction of the temple, and they set out for Götaland. There they attack King Hring who has small strength with him, most of his forces having gone to Bråvalla. Hring is killed in battle and Hleid is taken back to Glæsisvellir.

On their return from Bråvalla, Herraud and Bósi, accompanied by Bósi's brother Smid and Bosi's foster-mother Busla, set out to rescue Hleid. They accomplish their goal after many further adventures (and two further erotic encounters between Bósi and two maidens with riddling dialogues). Herraud regains Hleid and Bósi abducts King Harek's daughter Edda. Both Smid and Busla show their magical prowess. When King Harek of Bjarmaland attacks in the form of a giant boar, a giant bitch (apparently Busla) opposes him. Both fall into the sea and are never heard of again.

=== Epilogue ===
Herraud becomes king of East Götaland as heir to his father while Bósi becomes king of Bjarmaland by his marriage to Edda. By one of his other erotic encounters Bósi becomes the father of Svidi the Bold, the father of Vilmund the Absentminded.

Meanwhile, Herraud and Hleid become the parents of a daughter, that same famous Þóra Town-Hart (Þóra Borgarhjörtr) who kept a serpent in her bower and only he who could slay it could gain her hand in marriage. The eventual slayer and husband is the famous Ragnar Lódbrok. The tale explains at the end that this serpent had sprung from the vulture's egg which Herraud and Bósi had obtained in their quest.

== Other references to Herraud ==
This tale of Ragnar and the serpent also appears in Ragnars saga loðbrókar and Þáttr af Ragnars sonum, though in the former Herraud appears as Jarl Herrud (Herruðr) of Gautland and in the latter as Herraud, Jarl of West Götaland. But Herraud's father is also called Hring in this version. A variant with two serpents instead of one appears in Saxo Grammaticus' Gesta Danorum (Book 9) where Herraud appears as Herothus King of Sweden. None of these accounts explain the origin of the serpent or serpents and it would seem that the story of Herraud and Bósi was in part invented as a prequel to fill that gap.

== Alternate forms of names ==
- Herraud: Herrauðr; Herrud (Herruðr); Herothus, Anglicized as Heroth, Herodd.
- Bósi: Anglicized as Bosi.

== Influences ==
The saga influenced Sigrgarðs saga frœkna.

== Bibliography and external links ==
- English translations:
  - The Saga Of Bosi and Herraud in English translation by George L. Hardman with Facing Old Norse Text
  - "Bosi and Herraud" in Two Viking Romances. Trans. Pálsson, Hermann and Edwards, Paul (1995). Harmondsworth, England: Penguin. ISBN 0-14-600156-7.
  - "Bosi and Herraud" in Seven Viking Romances. Trans. Pálsson, Hermann and Edwards, Paul (1985). Harmondsworth, England: Penguin. ISBN 0-14-044474-2. Chapter 12, "A Wedding Feast", is included in Shire of Vanished Wood: Mac Taggart, Talbot. "Weddings in the Viking Age".
  - "Bosi and Herraud" in Gautrek's Saga and other medieval tales. Trans. Pálsson, Hermann and Edwards, Paul (1968). London: University of London Press. ISBN 0-340-09396-X.
- Original text:
  - Bósa saga ok Herrauðs in Old Norse from heimskringla.no
  - Snerpa: Netúgáfan: Fornrit: Bósa saga ok Herrauðs
  - University of Oregon: Norse: Fornaldarsögur norðurlanda: Bósa saga ok Herrauðs
  - Sagnanet: Bósa saga
- Bibliography
  - Entry in the Stories for All Time database.
