= Høgni =

- Gender: Male
- Language: Faroese

Origin
- Region of origin: Faroe Islands

Høgni is a Faroese male given name, originating from Old Norse Hǫgni, meaning "protector" or "patron", and is a variant of Hagen. The name may refer to:

- Høgni Hoydal (born 1966), Faroese politician
- Høgni Lisberg (born 1982), Faroese musician
- Høgni Madsen (born 1985), Faroese footballer
- Høgni Mohr (born 1968), Faroese writer
- Høgni Reistrup (born 1984), Faroese singer and musician
- Høgni Zachariasen (born 1982), Faroese footballer
