= Glæsisvellir =

Location in Jotunheim in Norse mythology

Glæsisvellir (Glittering Plains) was a location in Jotunheim in Norse mythology. It is mentioned in sources such as Bósa saga ok Herrauds, Hervarar saga, Þorsteins þáttr bæjarmagns and Helga þáttr Þórissonar.

== Legend ==
In Glæsisvellir could be found a location called Ódáinsakr, or Údáinsakr (lit. "Deathless Acre", meaning the "Undying Lands"). Everyone who went there became healthy and young, and so no one ever died there. The Eireks saga víðförla is about a man who searched for and found Údáinsakr.

In the Hervarar saga, it is the kingdom of Gudmund and his son Höfund. Gudmund was a friendly jötunn who was popular in later sagas.

In Gesta Danorum, Saxo Grammaticus makes a reference to Odainsaker as the place where the Scanian governor Fialler retired after having been attacked by the Danish king Wiglek:

Fiallerum Scaniae praefectum exsilio adegit, quem ad locum, cui Undensakre nomen est, nostris ignotum populis concessisse est fama.

Fialler, the governor of Skaane, he drove into exile; and the tale is that Fialler retired to a spot called Undensakre, which is unknown to our peoples.

== See also ==
- Elysian Fields
- Hyperborea
- Tír na nÓg

== Other sources ==
- Egeler, Matthias (2019): 'Iceland and the Land of Women. The Norse Glæsisvellir and the Otherworld Islands of Early Irish literature'. In: Aisling Byrne and Victoria Flood (eds.). Crossing Borders in the Insular Middle Ages. Brepols, Turnhout, p. 227-247
- Lindow, John (2002). Norse Mythology: A Guide to Gods, Heroes, Rituals, and Beliefs. Oxford University Press. ISBN 978-0-19-515382-8.
- Simek, Rudolf (1996). Dictionary of Northern Mythology. D. S. Brewer. ISBN 0-85991-513-1.
- Orchard, Andy (1997). Dictionary of Norse Myth and Legend. Cassell. ISBN 978-0-304-34520-5.
