= Illuga saga Gríðarfóstra =

Icelandic saga

Illuga saga Gríðarfóstra is a fornaldarsaga about a young Dane named Illugi who delivers a female troll and her daughter from a curse. The earliest manuscript (of 36 which are known to exist) dates from the first half of the 16th century (AM 123 8vo).

== Synopsis ==
The story begins in Denmark where there was a king called Hringr, the son of Skjöld Dagsson. It tells that this Skjöld had a saga of his own telling of his battles with a Herman. It lauds Hringr's qualities as well as those of his son Sigurd. The mother was Sigrid, the daughter of Vilhjalm (William) of Gaul.

Not far from where they lived there was a farmer called Svidi the Valiant whose wife was Hildr and son Illugi. This Illugi was tall, strong and good at any game, and he often played with Prince Sigurd. The two boys became close friends and swore to avenge one another. However, the king had an incompetent advisor named Björn who was treacherous and cunning, but skilled in seid (witchcraft) and a great warrior who ably defended Denmark for the king. Björn was jealous that Sigurd loved Illugi so much, so he slandered Illugi in front of the king and the prince, but Sigurd refused to believe him.

One summer, Sigurd, Björn and Illugi went a Viking expedition to Scotland and Orkney. The pillaging was good, and in the autumn they steered home to Denmark. However, a great storm arose and they were driven away to large bay called Gandvik (usually identified as the White Sea). It was cold and Björn asked Illugi to cross a fjord to fetch firewood. If he succeeded it would prove him a better advisor and he would get Björn's ring. Illugi, however, declined and said that he would go for wood anyway.

When he had crossed the fjord, he found a cave and soon encountered its inhabitant. It was a troll woman named Grid. She could not be called beautiful, in fact she was hideous. When Illugi said that he came searching for fire, she replied that he would get none unless he said three truthful words fast, and slept with her daughter. The daughter was stunning and Illugi immediately fell in love with her. The truthful words he chose to say were that Grid was hideous, the hall was beautiful and so was the daughter. Grid said that since he preferred the daughter to her, he could go to bed with the girl. Illugi was surprised that she was not enjoying the act, and soon he found out why because Grid grabbed him by the hair, put a knife to his throat and said that she would kill him for seducing the girl. However, when Illugi showed no signs of fear, she asked him to go back to bed remarking that she had never met anyone less afraid of dying. She had killed sixteen men with the knife and they had all been afraid. Grid said that he would have the girl whose name was Hildr, and then she told him her story.

She said that there was a king Áli in Alfheim (modern Bohuslän) whose queen was Alfrun. Their daughter's name was Signy and she was a very able girl. She was married to a king named Eric who died during an expedition in the west, leaving her with a very beautiful daughter named Hildr. Signy then returned to her father, but the mother soon died and the father remarried with a woman named Grimhild. This Grimhild was just as evil as she was beautiful, and so were her seven daughters that she had before marrying King Áli. Rumours began to spread in the kingdom and when a man disappeared mysteriously this was attributed to Grimhild. Grimhild murdered the old king by poison, became the ruler and soon her tyranny had laid the whole kingdom waste. She banished Signy and her daughter Hildr from the kingdom, putting a curse on them so they had to live alone in a cave. All the men who saw Hildr would fall in love with her, but Signy would murder them, and every night seven sisters would maim and mutilate her. They would live in this condition until she found a man who was not afraid of dying. When Signy heard this she was speechless of sorrow, but Hildr cursed Grimhild. She said that a fire would burn between her legs, and she would be burning on one side and freezing on the other until their own curse had passed, then Grimhild would fall into the fire and die.

Grid said that she was Signy and as Illugi had delivered them from the spell after eleven years, he would marry her daughter. Then the seven daughters of Grimhild arrived with short swords and attacked Grid, wounding her in the body and in her heart. Illugi threw himself into the fight to defend Grid, killed all seven of them and burned them in the fire. Grid gave Illugi gold and he returned to the ships with fire. The other men were glad to see him, but Björn slandered Hildr and said that she was an evil troll. Sigurd told Björn to keep quiet. Later at night Björn disappeared and in the morning they found him dead hanging from the mast of the ship. This was how Grid punished him for calling her daughter a troll.

Sigurd then sailed to Finnmark and then back to Denmark with the ships laden with booty. Later, king Hringr died by illness and Sigurd inherited Denmark and Skåne. Signy came to Denmark to join them and was well received by Illugi and Hildr. Illugi told Sigurd everything about Signy and Sigurd decided to marry her. They had many children and lived long. But Illugi lived longest even though he and Hildr never had any children. However, Illugi became the foster-father of Gnodar-Asmund.

== Editions and translations ==
- Waggoner, Ben (2010). Sagas of Giants and Heroes. New Haven, CT: Troth Publications. ISBN 978-0578059334. (Saga of Illugi, Grid's Fosterling, pp. 141–150)
- Lavender, Philip (2015). Illuga saga Gríðarfóstra: The Saga of Illugi, Gríður's Foster-son (PDF). Viking Society for Northern Research / University College London. ISBN 9780903521918.
- Guðni Jónsson and Bjarni Vilhjálmsson (eds), Fornaldarsögur norðurlanda, 3 vols (Reyjkjavík: Bókaútgáfan Forni, 1943–44),digitised at Heimskringa, digitised at Snerpa.
- Illugi Gridfostres saga, trans. by Kjell Tore Nilssen and Árni Ólafsson (2006).
- Illuga saga Gríðarfóstra/The Saga of Illugi the Foster Son of Grid, ed. and trans. by Gavin Chappell, The Complete Fornaldarsögur Norðurlanda, Legendary Sagas of the Northland, in English Translation (2011). [Another instance of the same translation here.]
- The Saga of Illugi, Grid's Foster Son, trans. by Peter Tunstall, 2005
