= Þorsteins þáttr bæjarmagns =

Legendary saga

Þorsteins þáttr bæjarmagns or The Story of Thorsteinn House-Power is a short legendary saga or þáttr.

It is a reworking of many of Thor's adventures, where Thorsteinn takes the place of Thor.

== Editions and translations ==
- Herman Palson and Paul Edwards translation from Seven Viking Romances at Jörmungrund.
- The story in Old Norse at «Norrøne Tekster og Kvad».
- The story in Old Norse at Snerpa.
- The saga in English Translation with Facing Old Norse text.
