= Legendary saga =

Genre of Norse saga

Fornalder ("times past"); painting by Peter Nicolai Arbo

A legendary saga or fornaldarsaga (literally, "story/history of the ancient era") is a Norse saga that, unlike the Icelanders' sagas, takes place before the settlement of Iceland. There are some exceptions, such as Yngvars saga víðförla, which takes place in the 11th century. The sagas were probably all written in Iceland, from about the middle of the 13th century to about 1400, although it is possible that some may be of a later date, such as Hrólfs saga kraka.

== Description of the sagas ==
In terms of form, fornaldarsögur are similar to various other saga-genres, but tend towards fairly linear, episodic narratives. Like sagas in other genres, many quote verse, but in the fornaldarsögur that verse is almost invariably in the metre of Eddaic verse (unlike the skaldic verse found in most other saga genres). The setting is primarily Scandinavia in the time prior to the settlement of Iceland and the conversion of Scandinavia, but occasionally it moves temporarily to more distant and exotic locations or has its characters encounter Christian cultures (one example of both being Örvar-Odds saga). There are also very often mythological elements, such as dwarves, elves, giants and magic. In centuries past, they were considered to be reliable historic sources by Scandinavian scholars, but since the 19th century, they have been considered to contain very little historic material. The present consensus is that, although some of the sagas contain a small core which is not fiction, or are based on historical characters, the primary function of the legendary sagas was entertainment, and the aim of the sagas has not been to present a historically accurate tale. Recently, however, it has been emphasized that the sagas are useful sources for the culture of 13th and 14th century Iceland, "in terms of the light that they can shed on the culture in which they were composed" i.e. Iceland in the later Middle Ages. In the words of Margaret Clunies Ross,

The themes, characters and the whole world of the fornaldarsaga lend themselves to interpretation, not as realistic narratives, but rather as subjects dealing with deep and disturbing issues that cannot be approached from the perspective of the mundane world but must rather be enacted in a literary world in which often taboo subjects can be raised and aired, though not necessarily resolved. They may also be treated in a comic or parodic vein.

Some of the sagas are based on distant historic characters, and this is evident in cases where there are corroborating sources, such as Ragnars saga loðbrókar, Yngvars saga víðförla and Völsunga saga. In the case of Hervarar saga, it conveys names of historical places in present Ukraine during the period c. 150-450, and the last part of the saga is used as a historic source for Swedish history. Indeed, they often contain very old Germanic matter, such as the Hervarar saga and the Völsunga saga which contains poetry about Sigurd that did not find its way into the Poetic Edda and which would otherwise have been lost (see the Great Lacuna). Other sagas deal with heroes such as Ragnar Lodbrok, Hrólf Kraki and Orvar-Odd. In these respects, then, the fornaldarsögur overlap in genre and occasionally content with the Kings' sagas.

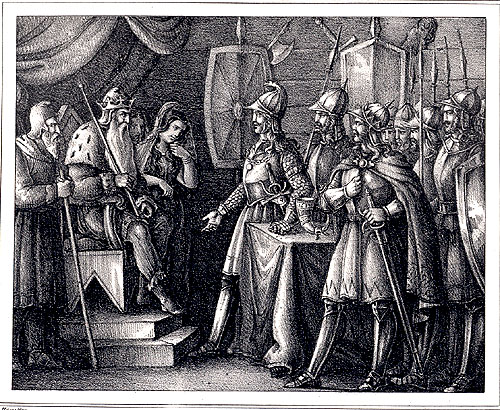
Hjorvard and Hjalmar propose to Ingeborg

The Fornaldarsagas have great value for legend research, since they contain motifs and complexes of motifs from many types of legend of which there is otherwise no documentation in Scandinavia prior to the mid-19th century. They are also of great value for scholars studying medieval Scandinavian ballads, particularly the Faroese kvæði, which are often based on the same matters. Moreover, they are also very important for the study of Scandinavian and Germanic heroic legends together with Saxo Grammaticus' Gesta Danorum which was based on the same heroic poetry and traditions.

Philologists have generally held the legendary sagas in less esteem, in terms of their literary value, than the Icelanders' sagas. The content is often less realistic, the characters more two-dimensional, and the sagas often borrow themes from each other, and from folk tales. In these aspects of style and reception, the fornaldarsögur tend to overlap with the Chivalric sagas, particularly those composed in medieval Iceland.

The legendary sagas have influenced later writers, for instance the Swede Esaias Tegnér, who wrote Frithiof's saga, based on the Friðþjófs saga ins frœkna. One such saga was even forged in the early modern period: Hjalmars och Hramers saga.

== List of the sagas ==
For a comprehensive list of the medieval fornaldarsögur, with information about manuscripts, bibliography, etc., see Stories for all time: The Icelandic fornaldarsögur.

- Áns saga bogsveigis
- Ásmundar saga kappabana - A saga based on the German Lay of Hildebrand.
- Bósa saga ok Herrauðs - like Beowulf it has Geatish heroes.
- Egils saga einhenda ok Ásmundar berserkjabana
- Eireks saga víðförla
- Frá Fornjóti ok hans ættmönnum
- Friðþjófs saga ins frœkna
- Gautreks saga
- Gríms saga loðinkinna
- Göngu-Hrólfs saga
- Hálfdanar saga Brönufóstra
- Hálfdanar saga Eysteinssonar
- Hálfs saga ok Hálfsrekka - A Norwegian legend, the hero of which is compared to Hrólf Kraki.
- Hervarar saga ok Heiðreks - a saga which may be of Swedish origin containing Swedish, Geatish and Gothic heroes. This saga still serves as a source for Swedish historians.
- Hjálmþés saga ok Ölvis
- Hrólfs saga Gautrekssonar - A saga about a Swedish warrior princess who is won by a Geatish prince.
- Hrólfs saga kraka; A saga which is related to the Old English poem Beowulf.
- Hrómundar saga Gripssonar
- *Huldar saga, a lost saga, and also one of the names of a post-medieval fornaldarsaga.
- Illuga saga Gríðarfóstra A saga of the more traditional fairy tale kind, where a young man delivers a troll woman and her beautiful daughter from a curse.
- Ketils saga hœngs
- *Ormars saga Fraðmarssonar, thought to have existed as the source of Ormars rímur.
- Örvar-Odds saga (two versions)
- Ragnars saga loðbrókar (two versions) - Sagas of Ragnar Lodbrok a legendary Viking warrior and his sons.
- Sturlaugs saga starfsama - A prequel to Göngu-Hrólfs Saga.
- Sögubrot af fornkonungum - A remnant of a larger work dealing with the Swedish and Danish kings of old.
- Sörla saga sterka
- Völsunga saga - The Scandinavian version of Nibelungenlied.
- Yngvars saga víðförla - A late saga of Swedish origin, which takes place in the 11th century and the historic basis of which is indisputable thanks to the fact that there are corroborating historic sources.
- Þjalar-Jóns saga
- Þorsteins saga Víkingssonar

== Þættir (short stories) ==
- Helga þáttr Þórissonar
- Jökuls þáttr Búasonar
- 'Norna-Gests þáttr
- Ragnarssona þáttr
- Sörla þáttr
- Tóka þáttr Tókasonar
- Völsa þáttr
- Þorsteins þáttr bæjarmagns

== Translations ==
- Waggoner, Ben (2010). Sagas of Giants and Heroes. New Haven, CT: Troth Publications. ISBN 978-0578059334. (Tale of Jokul Buason, pp. 53-64)
