= Gestumblindi =

Norse mythical name

Gestumblindi is a personal name appearing in two medieval Scandinavian legendary texts: Hervarar saga ok Heiðreks and (in the Latinised form as Gestiblindus) in Saxo Grammaticus' Gesta Danorum. A figure of this name also appears in several later Scandinavian folk tales as Gest Blinde.

== Etymology ==
Although generally attested in medieval sources as one word, the name Gestumblindi in rendered in the U-recension of Hervarar saga ok Heiðreks as Gestr inn blindi, which means both 'Gestr the Blind' and 'the blind guest'. It is thought that the transparently meaningful Gestr inn blindi is the origin of the name Gestumblindi. The adoption of the name by Óðinn in Hervarar saga ok Heiðreks is unlikely to be coincidental: 'since the one-eyed Óðinn is celebrated elsewhere not only for his half-blindness, but also for his propensity to wander the various worlds in the guise of a guest (and indeed using the name Gestr, "guest")'.

== Hervarar saga ok Heiðreks ==
In Hervarar saga ok Heiðreks, Gestumblindi is a powerful man who has angered King Heiðrekr. This summary is based on the R-recension of the saga, as edited by Christopher Tolkien; the other medieval redactions are substantively similar.

After a violent youth, King Heiðrekr has settled down in his kingdom of Reiðgotaland and become a wise king. He has in his hirð twelve men whom he entrusts to offer a just judgement to any of his enemies. Heiðrekr's enemies may also win their case against the king by posing riddles that Heiðrekr cannot answer.

Heiðrekr sends a message to Gestumblindi saying that he must come to a settlement with the king or risk his life. Gestumblindi sacrifices to Óðinn, asking him for assistance. Shortly thereafter, a stranger appears at Gestumblindi's homestead. They exchange clothes and Gestumblindi goes into hiding, and everyone believes the visitor—implicitly Óðinn—to be Gestumblindi himself.

The person thought to be Gestumblindi then goes to King Heiðrekr, takes up the option to challenge Heiðrekr to solve riddles, and, depending on the manuscript, presents around thirty-seven. Heiðrekr solves them all until, finally, Óðinn/Gestumblindi asks Heiðrekr "What did Odin whisper in Baldr's ear before Baldr was cremated?"—an unsolvable riddle of the kind known as a neck-riddle. Heiðrekr, realising that his visitor is Óðinn, becomes very angry and tries to strike Odin with his sword Tyrfingr, but Óðinn turns into a hawk and flees. Óðinn curses Heiðrekr to be killed by slaves, which transpires in the following chapter. (Heiðrekr's sword cuts off a piece of the bird's tail, which the saga says is why the hawk has a short tail.)

== Gesta Danorum ==
Saxo Grammaticus relates that Gestiblindus was a king of the Geats who gave himself and his kingdom up to Frodi, the king of Denmark on condition that Frodi would defend him against Alrik, the king of Sweden. Like the Gestumblindi of Hervarar saga ok Heiðreks, then, he relies on a champion to get him out of difficulty. The stories are not otherwise similar, however.
