= Árheimar =

Legendary capital of the Goths

Árheimar (Old Norse "river home") was a capital of the Goths, according to the Hervarar saga. The saga states that it was located at Danparstaðir ("Dnieper stead"), which is identified with the ruins of Kamjans'ke Horodyšče, near Kamianka-Dniprovska in southern Ukraine (Pritsak 1993).

== Hervarar saga ==
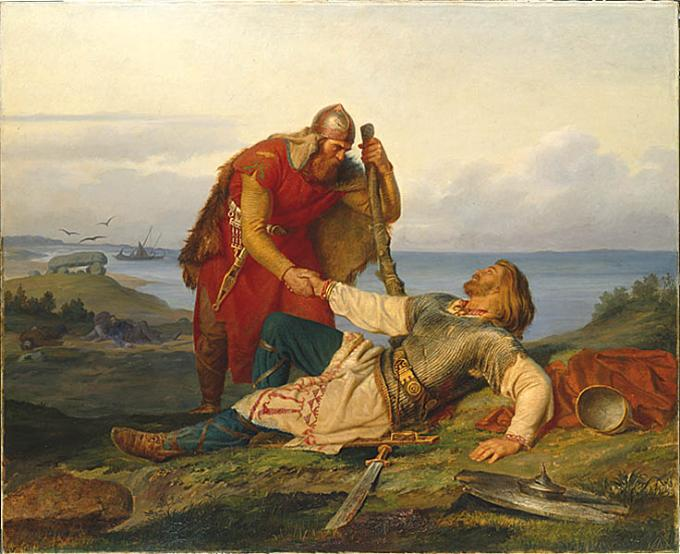
A scene from the Hervarar saga, Orvar-Odd and Hjalmar bid each other farewell, by Mårten Eskil Winge (1866).

The name first appears in the Hervarar saga when Angantyr has avenged his father Heidrek and retaken the Dwarf-cursed sword Tyrfing:

And when it was close on midnight, Angantyr went up to them and pulled them down the tent on top of the slaves and slew all nine of them, and carried off the sword Tyrfing as a sign that he had avenged his father. He then went home and had a great funeral feast held to his father's memory on the banks of the Dnieper, at a place called Arheimar.

— (Kershaw 1921)

It was during this feast that Angantyr's Hunnish half-brother Hlöd appeared with a large army to demand half the inheritance:

"Hlöth, the heir of Heithrek,
Came riding from the East,
To where Angantyr was holding
King Heithrek's funeral feast.
He came to his court in Arheimar
Where the Gothic people dwell,
Demanding his share of the heritage left
By the King when he journeyed to Hell."

— (Kershaw 1921)

The next place is when Angantyr's brave sister Hervor fights the Huns, although her small army is greatly outnumbered by the horde and she knows she cannot win:

"Then Ormar rode back to the fortress, and found Hervör and all her host armed and ready. They rode forthwith out of the fort with all their host against the Huns, and a great battle began between them. But the Hunnish host was far superior in numbers, so that Hervör's troops began to suffer heavy losses; and in the end Hervör fell, and a great part of her army round about her. And when Ormar saw her fall, he fled with all those who still survived. Ormar rode day and night as fast as he could to King Angantyr in Arheimar. The Huns then proceeded to ravage and burn throughout the land.".

— (Kershaw 1921)

Arheimar is mentioned for the last time when the Geatish king Gizur arrives with his army from Scandinavia to fight for the Goths, and tells the Huns where the Geats and the Goths will meet the Huns in battle. Hlöd demeans Gizur by calling him an Ostrogoth (Gryting) and 'Angantyr's man from Arheimar', and not a king of the Geats:

"When Hlöth heard Gizur's words, he cried:
'Lay hold upon Gizur of the Grytingar. Angantyr's man, who has come from Arheimar!'
King Humli said: 'We must not injure heralds who travel about unattended.'
Gizur cried: 'You Hunnish dogs are not going to overcome us with guile.'
Then Gizur struck spurs into his horse and rode back to King Angantyr, and went up to him and saluted him. The King asked him if he had parleyed with the Huns.
Gizur replied: 'I spoke with them and I challenged them to meet us on the battle-field of Dunheith [i.e. the plains of the Danube] and in the valleys of Dylgia.'"

— (Kershaw 1921)

== Notes ==
=== Sources ===
- Pritsak, Omeljan (1993). "Hlǫðskviða". In Pulsiano, Phillip; Wolf, Kirsten (eds.). Medieval Scandinavia, and encyclopedia. Garland Publishing, inc. New York & London. pp. 286–287. ISBN 9780824047870.
- Kershaw, Nora (1921), Stories and Ballads of the Far Past, Cambridge University Press, pp. 79–150, e-text
  - Also Kershaw's translation alongside the Old Norse Hervarar Saga og Heiðreks [The Saga of Hervör and Heithrek]
