= Ormars rímur =

Icelandic epic poem

Ormars rímur is a fifteenth-century Icelandic ríma-cycle, relating how Ormarr Fraðmarsson slays the giant Bjarkmar and his uncles Gyrðr and Atli. In doing so, Ormarr avenges his father and wins a bride and kingdom.

== Origins ==
The rímur-cycle is probably based on a lost, prose fornaldarsaga. The same material also appears in later Scandinavian ballads. Katarzyna Anna Kapitan and Philip Lavender summarise research on the origins of Ormars rímur up to 2022 thus:

Svend Grundtvig (1862[...]) believed that there had been ancient pan-Scandinavian songs concerning Ormar, which had been directly transformed into the Ormar-ballads and indirectly, via a prose saga, into Ormars rímur. He did not mention Hervarar saga as part of this process, merely as a parallel example of similar development. Sophus Bugge[...], on the other hand, saw Hervarar saga as being the ultimate source of Ormars rímur and the Ormar-ballads, albeit via several intermediate stages of transformation, the first of which was an older form of the Faroese ballad Arngríms synir. Knut Liestøl (1915[...]) summarised and evaluated Grundtvig’s and Bugge’s ideas, but then argued that both the Icelandic Ormars rímur and the Scandinavian ballads were based on a lost Ormars saga, seeing Arngríms synir as a separate branch of ballad development from Hervarar saga but without any direct influence on the Ormar-branch. Liestøl affirmed that the lost Ormars saga was a literate composition based on Hervarar saga and other fornaldarsögur, principally Sturlaugs saga starfsama. Einar Ólafur Sveinsson (1956[...]) likewise considered it beyond doubt that both the rímur and the Norwegian ballad were derived from a written version, specifically an Icelandic one, and that the ballad then spread from Norway to other parts of Scandinavia. Erik Sønderholm [...] muddied the transparent waters of Einar and others by arguing, conversely, that most of the Norwegian ballads, many of which were recorded in the nineteenth century, were most likely derived from the Danish printed editions of the sixteenth and seventeenth centuries. [...] The simple fact is that nearly all scholars have been in agreement that there was an older version, prior to the extant poetic version, and, since Bugge, that that older version is connected to Hervarar saga in one way or another.

The poem is also thought to have had some literary connection to Úlfhams rímur.

== Manuscripts ==
The poem survives in three medieval manuscripts, copied shortly after the poem's composition: Kollsbók, Staðarhólsbók (AM 604 d 4to), and Reykjavík, Stofnun Árna Magnússonar AM 146 a 8vo. All are thought to be independent descendants from the lost archetype. It also survives in a number of later manuscripts.

The prose summaries found in the manuscript AM 601a 4to and in Ormars þáttur Framarssonar share details absent from the surviving manuscripts of the rímur which indicate that they are based on a slightly different version of the rímur, now lost.

== Summary ==
This summary is based on that of Svend Grundtvig.

Ríma I. There was a king of Gautland called Hringr. He had a daughter called Ása, as beautiful as the sun and very well brought up. In his household was a young man called Ormarr, son of the famous Fraðmarr (who fell in battle, to an unknown slayer). The young Ormarr was brought up by his mother's brother Saxi, and distinguished himself among others of his age group. One day, King Hringr sat at his table, when a giant, eighteen ells tall, entered his hall, with a club in his hand. He stands in the middle of the floor and looks around, while the court sits dumbstruck. No-one greets him or offers him a seat. Then he gives himself leave to sit on a bench, crushing three of the king's warriors. He then eats and drinks like no-one has seen before. He now greets the King, who enquires after his name and mission. "I am called Bjarkmarr", he says, "and I have come to give you a choice between two things: either to give me your daughter or to face me in a duel". The King replies, and offers his daughter to whatever of his warriors will fight this hateful troll in his stead. Everyone sits in silence for a long time, because everyone knows he is no match for the giant. Then Bjarkmarr replies and says "yes, so I had better choose the King over all the other Gautar". At this point, Ormarr, who had been sitting sorrowfully at the exchange, can no longer restrain himself and leaps across the King's table, shouting "I have intended that beautiful maiden for myself, and you, Bjarkmar, will lose your life by my sword and be food for dogs and ravens". The giant is angered by this speech, but restrains himself until the next day, when the duel is to take place.

Ríma II. After nightfall, while everyone else is asleep, Ormarr walks out to the headland where his father's burial mound lies and says "wake up, father, and talk with your son!" He asks twice, to no avail, and then threatens his father, at which point the earth shakes and the stones break, and Ormarr sees his dead father standing before him, sword in hand. "I have lain long in my mound, far from people", says the corpse, "and no warrior was so bold that he wished to fight me". Ormarr replies "a fiend has come into the country, and I must win myself a bride. Therefore, would you now give me your good sword?" "That's a feeble request", says the corpse: "you already have plenty of new swords which you can use." Ormarr replies: "if you don't give me the sword, I'll break into the burial mound and get it myself. I'm not unwilling to, but it would be a shame if I had to." The corpse replies: "no better sword will you find above ground, but even the best weapon won't save a man who is fated to die. I was killed in battle, and you can't have the sword unless you promise to avenge my death". "I'll do that", says Ormarr, "as true as I live, unless I die trying; but you'll have to tell me who killed you." "It was the two uncles of the giant Bjarkmarr, whom you now have to deal with", says the corpse; "eleven strong warriors attacked me at once; nine fell to my sword, but Gyrðr and Atli gave me a mortal wound. So take the sword, my son and heir. Warriors called my sword Birtingr; now it is yours; I often bore it, bloody, from the slaughter. Nowhere will you find a better sword; that blue blade is so sharp that no-one can defend themselves against it." Ormarr joyfully thanks his father, who gives him his blessing in return, and Ormar returns to the court.

Ríma III. Next morning, Ormarr prepares for battle. The King's daughter is very afraid because he must fight the giant, and everyone feels that he is all too young for the fearsome battle. The river-island where the duel must take place is hard by the King's castle. Ormarr is the first on the scene, but the giant soon arrives with noise and howling that makes the sky and land shake, stomping so hard that he sinks up to his knee in the earth with each step. Ormarr is ready; the giant saws the air with his club; Ormarr hews at him with Birtingr and cuts off both legs, killing him. Now young Ormarr returns to the castle and greets the King and receives Ása, who is now his bride. He does not wish to rest, however, because he wants to avenge his father. The King gives him a dragonship along with a fleet of one hundred. He sails out, while his bride stands weeping on the shore. Ormarr has a fair breeze until he sees a small island ahead. He finds a battle-fleet at anchor, and asks who leads it. He is told the captains are two brothers, never before defeated in battle, named Gyrðr and Atli. "But who captains this warship, which comes sailing here?", asks Ormarr's interlocutor, and he says: "Ormarr the young, the slayer of Bjarkmarr". The brothers are swiftly informed, and ask him what he will pay by way of reparations for their nephew Bjarkmarr — either he can give them goods and money and his betrothed and go in peace, or they can kill him and take these anyway. Ormarr despatches the emissary, saying "you will have misfortune if you persist in this errand. Say to the brothers that I will soon be with them to test their strength." The messenger brings the brothers this answer, adding that after they have seen Ormarr and his army, they will be worried about the outcome.

Ríma IV. The next morning, both armies land on the island, and attack each other. Then the brothers recognise Birtingr in Ormarr's hand and ask where he got the sword. "My father gave it to me", says Ormarr; "eleven people attacked him when he was slain; it was a dastardly act, and I will now avenge it." So begins the battle; the brothers make headway into Ormarr's army and fell many men. There is so much dust that no-one can see the sky, and blood comes up to the knee. But, with Birtingr, Ormarr is able to slay everyone, and in the end he fells both Gyrðr and Atli, splitting the former vertically and the latter horizontally. After their death he allows the rest of the army to live, has the wounded from both sides bandaged, and heads back to Gautland with his plunder. The King meets him on the beach and leads him home to the hall, where they drink the wedding feast with great joy. Ormarr and his princess live long and happily together; Ormarr inherits the kingdom when King Hringr dies; his two sons, Saxi and Fróðmarr, become powerful warriors; and Fóðmarr inherits Birtingr from his father.

== Influence ==
A short prose summary of Ormars rímur, entitled Efnið úr Ormars rímum ('the contents of Ormars rímur') appears in the Icelandic manuscript Reykjavík, Árni Magnússon Institute, AM 601 a 4to, from around 1700. It is thought to have been made at the behest of Magnús Jónsson digri in response to a request made by Árni Magnússon in 1691. This summary was copied and slightly updated in 1884 in Reykjavík, National Library of Iceland, Lbs 3128 4to.

Ormars rímur was independently prosified as Ormars þáttur Framarssonar, which survives in eleven Icelandic manuscripts from the seventeenth century to the nineteenth. This prose text was in turn the basis for a new rímur, Rímur af Ormari Framarssyni, composed in 1833 by Sigurður Jónsson (1802–1860), which is known in at least three manuscripts.

== Editions and translations ==
=== Ormars rímur ===
- Haukur Þorgeirsson, 'Hljóðkerfi og bragkerfi: Stoðhljóð, tónkvæði og önnur úrlausnarefni í íslenskri bragsögu ásamt útgáfu á Rímum af Ormari Fraðmarssyn' (Ph.D. thesis, University of Iceland, 2013), pp. 279–318 (diplomatic transcription of Kollsbók); 319-43 (normalised, critical edition).

=== Efnið úr Ormars rímum ===
- Katarzyna Anna Kapitan and Philip Lavender, 'The Prose Summary as Antiquarian Tool and Literary Springboard: An Edition and Translation of Ormars þáttur Framarsonar', Opuscula, 20 (2022), pp. 101–60 (pp. 150–59, with English translation).

=== Ormars þáttur Framarssonar ===
- Katarzyna Anna Kapitan and Philip Lavender, 'The Prose Summary as Antiquarian Tool and Literary Springboard: An Edition and Translation of Ormars þáttur Framarsonar', Opuscula, 20 (2022), pp. 101–60 (pp. 131–49, giving critical editions of texts from several manuscripts, with English translations).

== Samples ==
=== Ríma I ===
The following sample covers the introduction of the poem's hero Ormarr and the arrival of his antagonist Bjarkmarr.

9	Gautlandi hefir geysihægr og gumnum átt’ að stýra, var við ýta örr og frægr hann átti drottning dýra.	A very gentle [man] had to rule Gautland and its men; generous and famous among men, he had a noble daughter.
10	Valdur átti vísir hér vænni borg að ráða, höldar nefna Hring fyrir mér hreyti Fofnis láða.	The powerful leader had to govern a beautiful city here; men name him to me as Hringur, the sharer of Fáfnir's lands [= gold].
11	Dögling ól við dýra frú dóttur blíða eina, Ása heitir auðar brú ásjón berr hun hreina.	By his noble lady, the king had one good-natured daughter: the bridge of wealth [= woman] is called Ása; she bears a pure complexion.
12	Burðug hefir af bókum list bauga Lofnin snjalla, kænni þjóna klæða Rist kónga dætr og jalla.	The high-born, clever Lofn of rings [= woman] has skill in books; the Rist of clothes [= woman] teaches the daughters of kings and earls how to serve.
13	Hverju fljóði fegri var falda nift in svinna, lýðir fengu’ af ljósri þar langa nauð og stinna.	The smart kinswoman of pleats [= woman] was more beautiful than every [other] maiden; from that fair [woman] men received long and harsh distress.
14	Því var líkt sem sól að sjá seima Gefn in ríka, höldar fundu’ í heimi þá henni öngva líka.	The powerful Gefn of gold [= woman] was like the sun to look upon; men found no-one comparable to her in the world then.
15	Ormar nefni’ eg auðar Þór, enn mun koma í kvæði; hann mun auka afrek stór áðr en lýkur fræði.	I name a Þór of wealth [= man] Ormar, and he will come into the song: he will increase his great accomplishments before this history ends.
16	Sjá var fæddr af fríðri art fleygir nöðru stíga, fremdar örr og frægr um mart furðu gjarn til víga.	This sharer of the snake's path [= gold] was born of a noble dynasty, ready for honour and famous in many matters, amazingly eager for battles.
17	Hans hné faðirinn foldu að fleina lundr enn snjalli, engi vissi ýta það hverr olli Fraðmars falli.	His father—the courageous tree of arrows [= warrior]— fell to the earth; no-one among men knew it, who caused the fall of Fraðmar.
18	Saxi hét sjá sveini ann, sigr er gjarn að vinna, frægur hafði fóstrað hann Fraðmars arfa enn svinna.	This [man] was called Saxi—he loved the boy— he is eager to gain victory: famous, he had fostered the clever heir of Fraðmar.
19	Systursyni gat sínum kennt Saxi listir allar, því bar frægur flesta mennt fram yfir kempur snjallar.	Saxi was able to teach the son of his sister every skill: thus the famous [man] stood out above bold warriors.
20	Eitthvert sinn að seima Þór sat yfir drykkju-borðum gaur kom inn só geysistór með grimmdar þungum orðum.	Once upon a time, as the Þór of gold [= man] sat at his drinking-table, a man entered, so amazingly large, with heavy words of cruetly.
21	Grimmr í lund og geysiknár gekk við kylfu eina, sjá var átján álna hár og öllu verri’ að reyna.	Fierce in demeanour and extraordinarily strong, he walked bearing a club; he was eighteen ells tall and even worse to take on.
22	Gefr hann staðar á gólfi þá og gálir upp á mengi, hirðin sitr og horfir á heilsa réð honum engi.	He makes silence fall, then, across the hall-floor and laughs at the assembly. The court sits and looks on; no-one made to greet him.
23	Þessi gjörir að görpum sköll og ganar að einu sæti, só kom þuss í þengils höll, það eru engi mæti.	He makes a laughing-stock of the heroes and rushes to a seat. Thus the ogre entered the prince's hall; there are no opponents.

=== Ríma II ===
The following sample is from the dialogue between Ormarr and his dead father, Hringr, from ríma II. The passage corresponds to the famous poem Hervararkviða in Heiðreks saga, a probable source for Ormars rímur, in which Hervör asks her dead father Angantýr for the sword Tyrfingr.

15	Grimmlega skelfur grjót og fold, gjörði myrkrið mesta, hefi’ eg það frétt að hrærðist mold, hauðrið tók að bresta.	The rocks and earth shake fearsomely, the greatest darkness fell, I have heard that the ground moved; the earth began to crack.
16	Dregst á fætr hinn dauði þá með dýrum hjalta vendi, fylkir lítur fölvan ná, föður sinn Ormar kenndi.	Then the dead man draws himself to his feet, turned with the precious hilt; the warrior looks upon the pale corpse: Ormarr recognised his father.
17	„Só hef eg lengi legið í haug lýðum firður öllum, fýstist engi’ að finna draug fyrr af görpum snjöllum.“	"I have lain so long in the burial mound, far from all people; no-one rushed to find the warrior far from valiant heroes."
18	„Virðar hér með vópnin þunn vilja á landið herja, birta vil eg þér brögðin kunn, brúði á eg að verja.	"Men with slender weapons want to raid the land here; I want to demonstrate a well known trick to you: I have to defend my bride.
19	Hvassan vilda’ eg, hjálma njótr, hrottann af þér þiggja, mér mun ei“, kvað málma brjótr, „meir á öðru liggja.“	Njótr of helmets, I want to to receive from you the sharp blade; nothing"—said the breaker of metal— "could be more important to me."
20	„Býsn er í hvers beiða kann beygir sterkra randa, áttu frægur við fullan sann fjölda nýrra branda.“	"It is a wonder that the bender of strong shields knows how to request it; famous man, you have, without a doubt, lots of new swords."
21	„Eg skal rjúfa’ hinn ramma haug og randa naðrinn sækja, hræðast ekki’ enn harða draug, horfir nú til klækja.“	"I will break into the robust mound and seize the snake of shields; I do not fear the stern warrior; you should be ashamed."
22	„Sannast má eg það segja þér, svinnum menja Baldri, heldur varð sá heppinn mér, hrottann lér eg aldri.	"Most certainly I can say it to you, swift Baldr of neck-rings; instead of him getting lucky with me, I will never grant the sword.
23	Garpar ei só góða hlíf, geir né brynju eiga, feigum gefr ei fyrðum líf þá fólki’ er lagað að deyja.	No fighters own such a good protection, spear, or mail-coat; life gives up on mortal men when people are fated to die.
24	Dapra fekk eg dauðans pín, drengr að vópna hjaldri, ef heitir þú ekki’ að hefna mín hrottann fær þú aldri.“	I received the lamentable torture of death, a man in the battle of weapons; if you don’t promise to avenge me, you will never get the sword."
25	„Seg þú mér hverr sæfði hal með sverði, vaskan tiggja, vil eg só heill eg hefna skal hratt eða dauður liggja.“	"Tell me who killed the hero, bold king, with the sword: I, thus healthy, want to avenge swiftly, or lie dead."
26	„Bjarkmar risi er brögnum skæðr, bjóða vill þér pínu, faðir hans átti fræga bræðr, falli olli mínu	"The giant Bjarkmarr is harmful to the elite, he wants to serve you torment; his father had famous brothers: he brought about my death.
27	Taktu nú við hrotta hér“, halnum draugrinn trúði, „eg má synja einkis þér, arfi minn hinn prúði.	Now take up the sword here"— the warrior trusted the hero— "I cannot refuse you anything, my proud heir.
28	Birting nefna bragnar þann brand að þú hefir fengið, bar eg þá jafnan blóðgan hann er biluðu aðrir drengir.	Warriors call the blade that you have received Birtingr; I bore the continually bloody sword when other men failed.
29	Ellefu sóttu að mér senn urðu níu að falla, alla vildu afreks menn ýtar þessa kalla.	Later, eleven attacked me; nine turned out to fall; men wanted to call them all people of attainment.
30	Gyrðr og Atli, garpar tveir, gengu’ að mér til nauða, seggir undan settu þeir, sjálfur fekk eg dauða.“	Two thugs, Gyrðr and Atli, went at me in a tight spot; those men got away; I myself received death."
31	„Beið eg aldri betri ferð af blíðum málma Baldri, gaftu mér eð góða sverð; get eg það launað aldri.“	"I never undertook a better journey from the happy Baldur of metals: give me the good sword: I will never be able to repay you."
32	„Þóttú farir um flestöll lönd og fýsist stórt að vinna, hvergi muntu hjalta vönd í heimi slíkan finna.	"Even if you travel through almost all countries and push yourself hard to strive, nowhere in the world will you find such a wand of hilts.
33	Jafnan muntu brandinn blá bera í vópna hjaldri, hann er rétt sem silfr að sjá segi’ eg hann sljóvgist aldri.“	You will continually carry the blue blade amidst the din of weapons: it is just like silver to look upon; I say that it will never grow blunt."
34	„Sittu nú með sæmd og skraut, seggrinn hverjum frægri, mér mun hent að halda’ á braut hart á þessu dægri.“	"Now, man more famed than anyone, sit with honour and finery; it will be fitting for me to head off swiftly this very day.“
35	„Far þú, sveinn, með sæmd og prís,“ segir sjá garprinn mesti, „heillin sé þér harðla vís en hamingjan aldri bresti.“	"Go, lad, with honour and praise", says this greatest of heroes; " and your good fortune never break".
36	Bragning kemur til borgar heim búinn til hreystiverka, hefir í hendi hræva tein og hjalta naðrinn sterka.	The prince comes him to his city, ready for deeds of bravery; he has in his hand the twig of corpses and the strong hilt of the snake.
37	Það hefi’ eg frétt að fleina Týr fór í brynju síða, ýtum hverfur óðar smíð, agti þeir sem vilja.	I have heard that the Týr of arrows went widely in his mailcoat; the crafter of poetry turns to people; let them discuss as they wish.
