= Christian Gottlieb Kratzenstein Stub =

Danish painter (1783–1816)

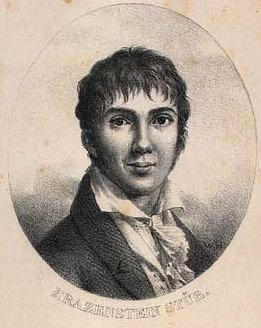
Engraving of Kratzenstein Stub by Wilhelm Heuer, c. 1800

Christian Gottlieb Kratzenstein Stub (15 August 1783 – 24 July 1816), also written Kratzenstein-Stub, was a Danish Golden Age painter. He is primarily known for his mythological compositions, which were popular in Denmark during his lifetime.

== Biography ==
=== Early life and education ===
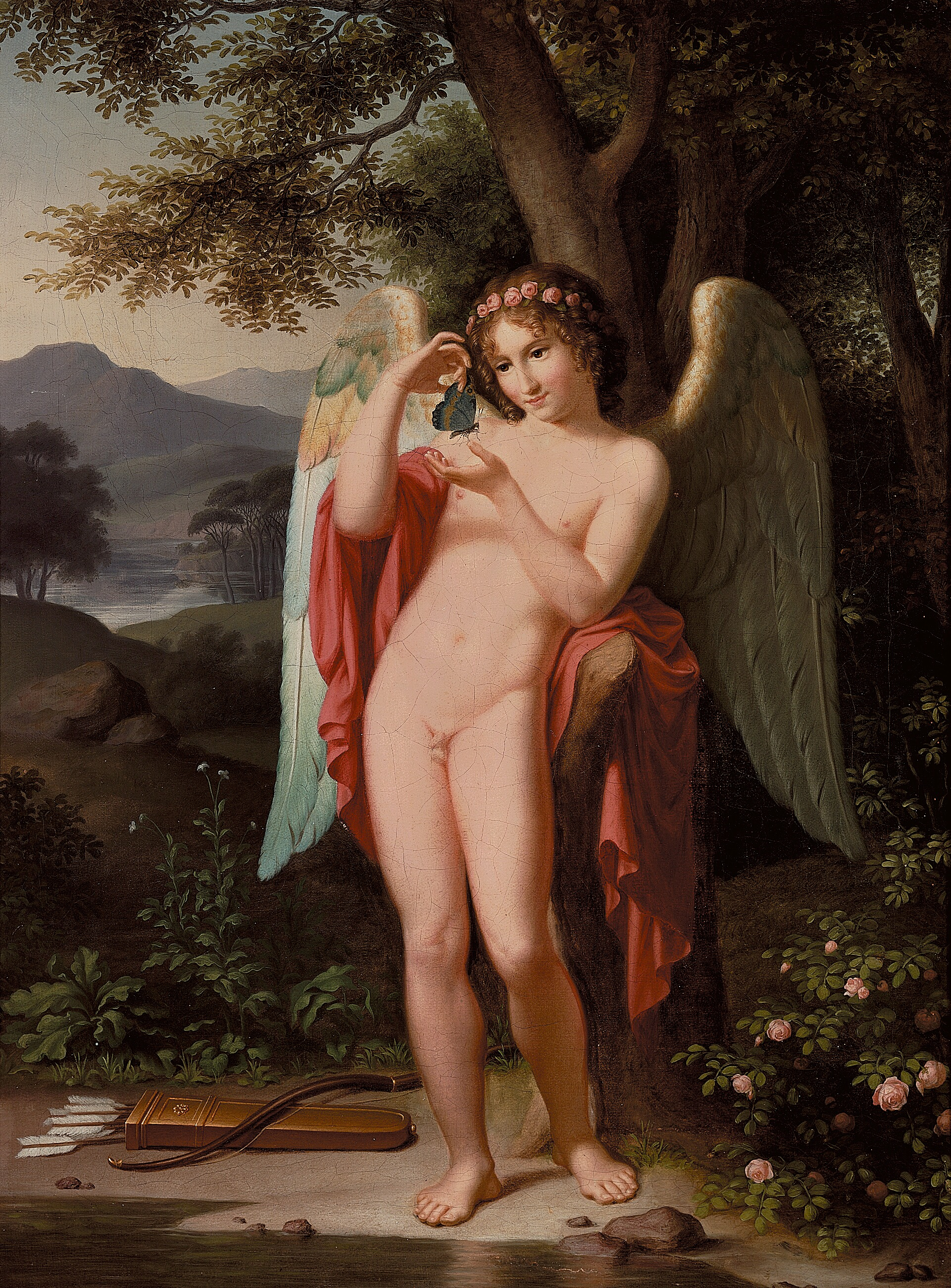
An early painting: Cupid with the butterfly, 1810

Stub was born in Copenhagen in 1783. He was the son of Otto Frederik Stub (1753–1827), an officer in the Royal Danish Navy, and Louise Elisabeth née Kratzenstein (1757–1844). He adopted the surname of his maternal grandfather, Professor Christian Gottlieb Kratzenstein. Following his grandfather's death in 1795, Stub attended Salzmann's school near Gotha, where he showed an early artistic talent for wax figure sculptures.

Kratzenstein Stub spent his first years in the house of his maternal grandfather, after whom he was named, and whose family name he later added to his own. When the maternal grandfather died in 1795, the boy was sent to Salzmanns school in Schnepfenthal near Gotha, where he stayed for four years. His works there included a series of small figures that he formed from wax. He returned to Copenhagen and passed the matriculation exam in 1802 with distinction.

From his grandfather, he had come into possession of a small inheritance, which enabled him to continue his studies. He spent some time studying mechanics and hydraulics, but then decided to go into art, apprenticing himself to Nicolai Abildgaard to become a painter. However, he soon decided to continue his work largely as a self-taught artist. His engagement in 1808 to Mille Johanne Smith, a daughter of provost Troels Smith, caused him to concentrate on art.

=== France and Italy ===
To learn more about great art, in 1809 he travelled to France and Italy. In Paris he was influenced by François Gérard; in Rome he came under the influence of Bertel Thorvaldsen, in 1810 making an oil painting, Cupid with the butterfly.

=== Back in Denmark ===
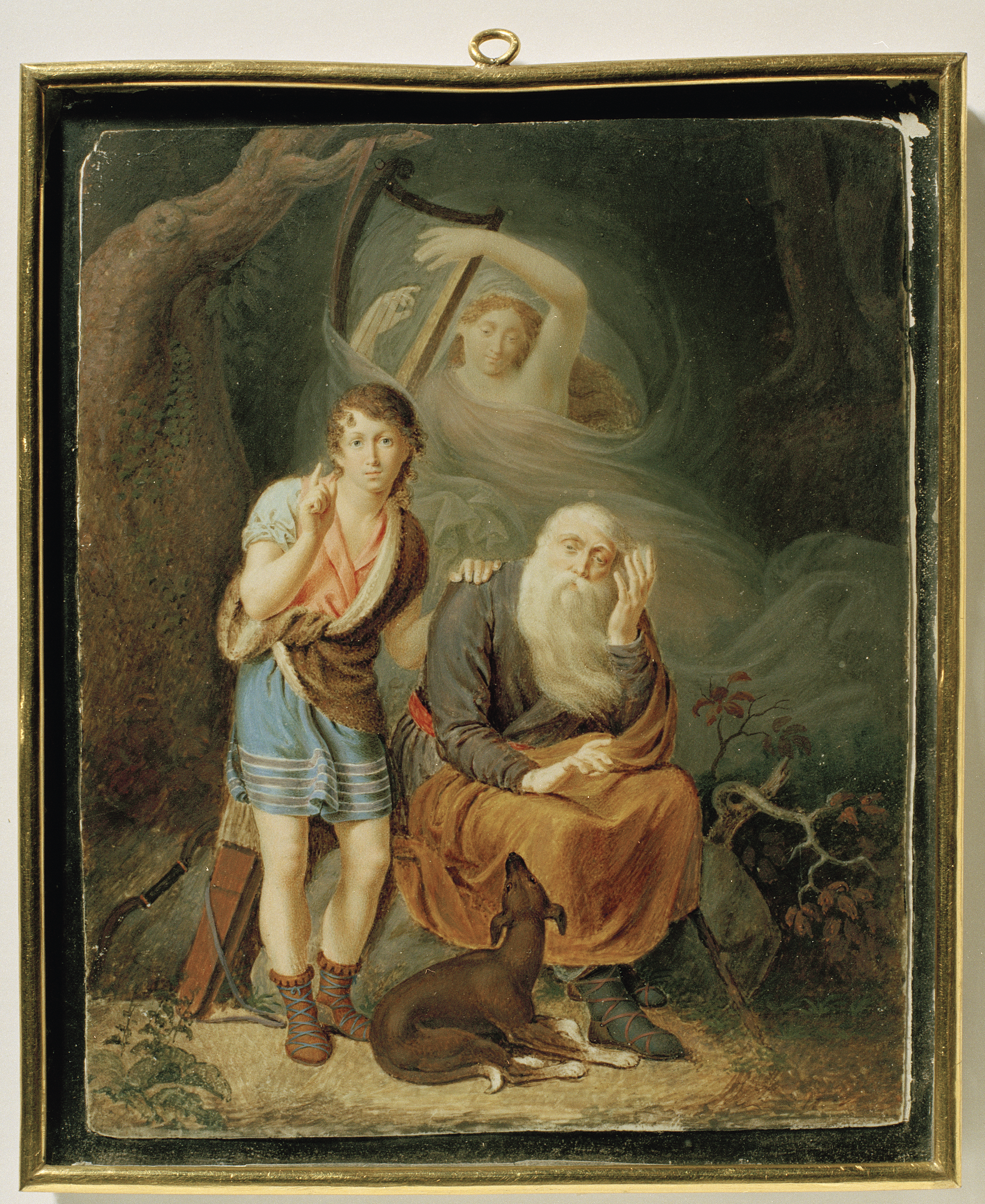
Ossian and Alphin's son listen to Malvin's spirit

In 1811 he returned to Copenhagen and celebrated his wedding. His paintings became more lively, and in the coming years he executed a series of portraits – mostly ladies of the distinguished Copenhagen bourgeoisie, and a series of figurative compositions, which either dealt with the legend of Cupid and Psyche, or whose subjects were borrowed from Ossian's poetry. Most of these compositions, however, did not go beyond drawings or sketches. He managed to complete only the picture Ossian and Alphin's son before his early death. In addition, in 1813 he had painted the picture Hother and the three forest nymphs (after Saxo), which gained him membership of the Danish Academy.

=== Death ===
Kratzenstein Stub's health, never strong, was weakened by the early death of a daughter. He became depressed, finding relief in music, to the extent that he could not paint unless his wife played the harp for him. When painting the dead child of Baron Reedtz-Thott on Gavnø in an icy hall, he contracted tuberculosis. In the summer of 1816, he went out to a sister at Kalundborg Ladegård to convalesce in the country air, but he died there on 24 July of the same year. He was buried at St. Olai’s Cemetery, Kalundborg.

== Appreciation of his art ==
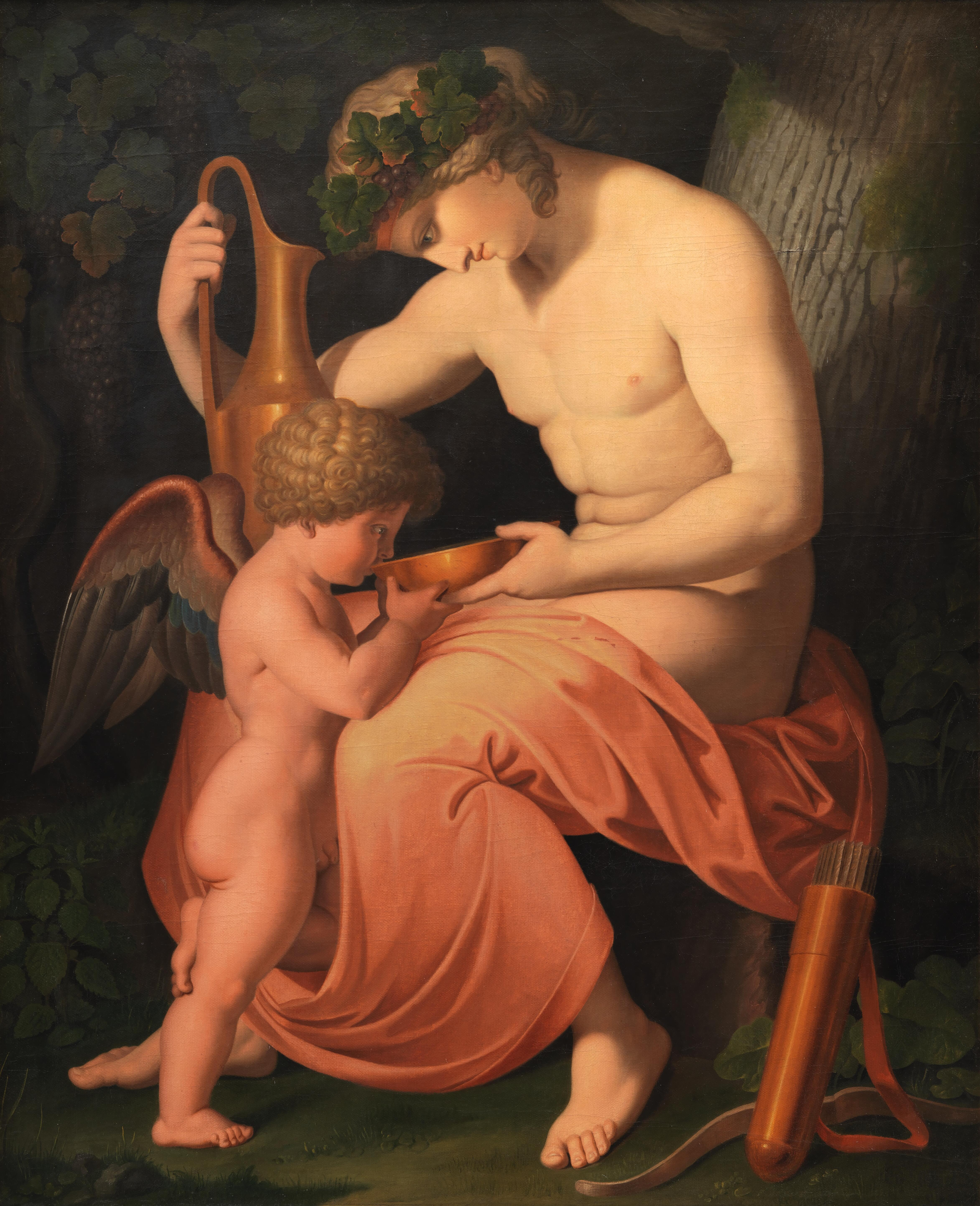
Kratzenstein Stub has been compared to the German painter Asmus Jacob Carstens, who created this Bacchus and Cupid in 1796.

Kratzenstein Stub's pictures were much admired in his lifetime, such as by Friederike Brun. The Danish Academy went so far as to appoint him together with C.W. Eckersberg to compete for the professorship at their model school. This general satisfaction probably came from Kratzenstein Stub's choice of subjects, which educated Danes of the time especially appreciated. Thus it was said at the time in Denmark that "it belonged to the [sculptor's] chisel to portray gods and heroes, the [artist's] brush, on the other hand, to depict the actions of heroes and visions from the spirit world". It was felt at the time that a picture should firstly contain beautiful emotions, often wrapped in witty allegories; then beautiful lines; and finally, beautiful colours. Kratzenstein Stub's pictures were thought to embody "a Raphael Mengs' colour and a van der Werff's brush". As an artist, Kratzenstein Stub was compared to Asmus Jacob Carstens, another artist without academic training who reached his ideal representations of people more through the study of other art than through nature. But while Carstens' works were thought to be more epic and sculptural, Kratzenstein Stub's compositions—especially concerning Cupid and Psyche—were felt to embody a lyrical, sometimes sentimental sweetness that corresponds to the vague, dreamy character of his drawing style.

== Gallery ==
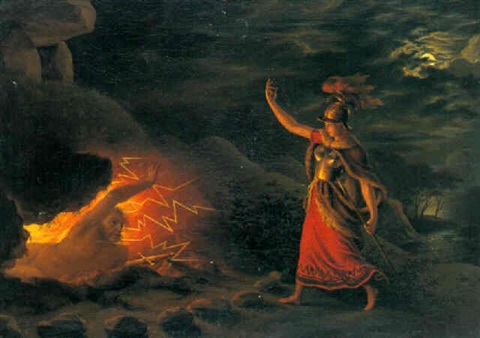
Hervör awakens the ghost of his father Angantýr from his burial mound on Samsø to demand the cursed sword Tyrfing.

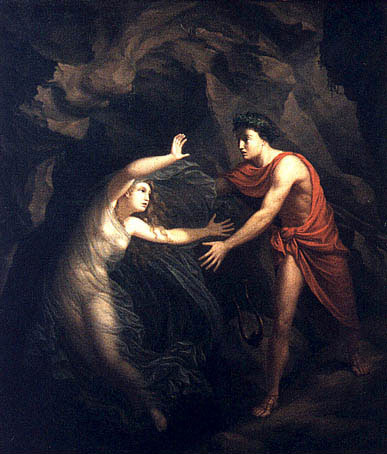
Orpheus looks back and fails to save Eurydice from the underworld

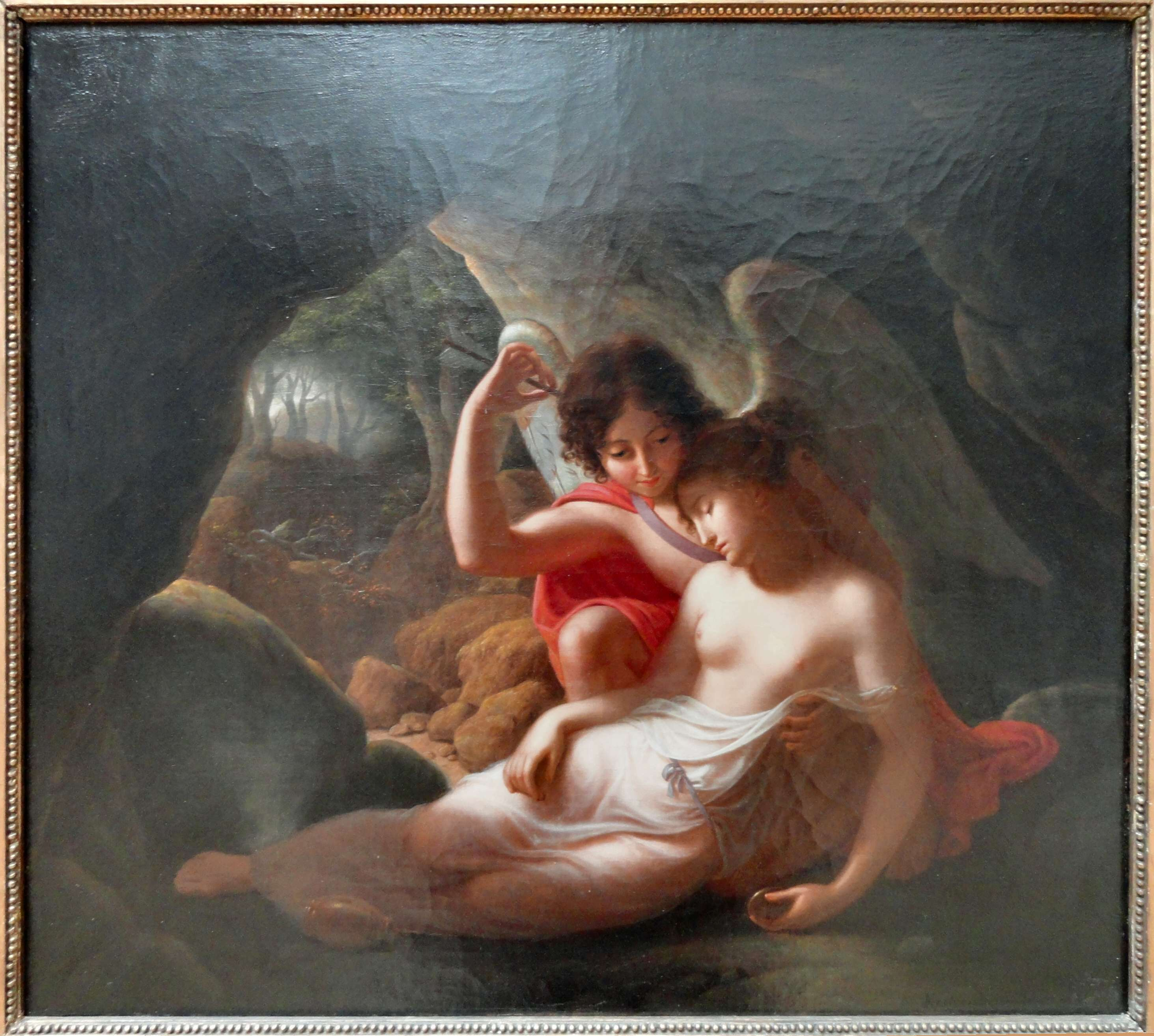
Cupid awakens Psyche with the tip of his arrow

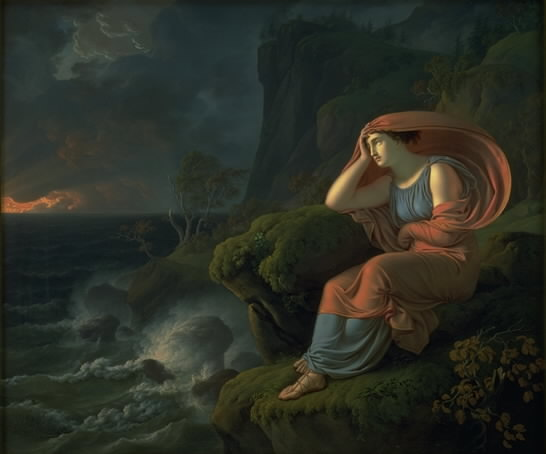
Alkyone waits in vain for her departed spouse

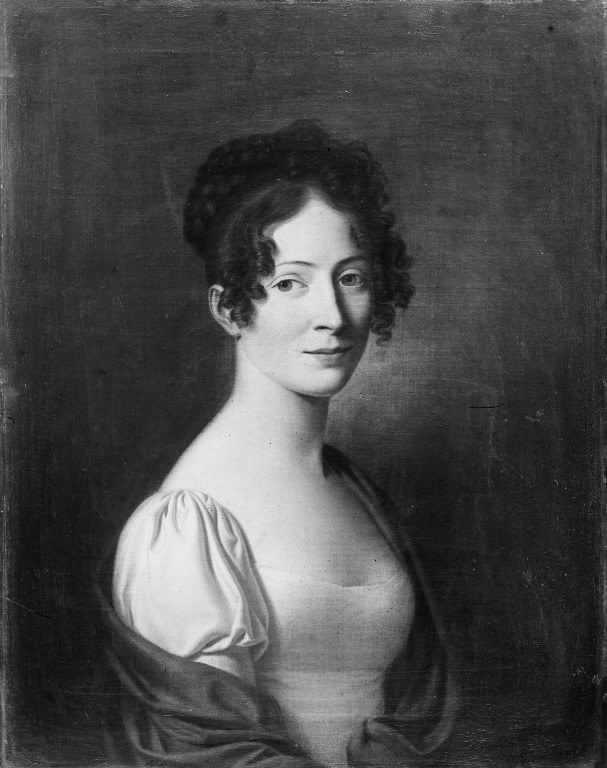
Conference councillor Marie Sophie Frølich, née de Coninck, 1814

== Sources ==
- Bricka, Carl Frederick (1905). "Kratzenstein-Stub, Christian Gottlieb". Dansk biografisk Lexikon.
- Sloan, Thomas La Brie (1972). Neoclassical and Romantic Painting in Denmark, 1754–1848. Evanston, Illinois: Northwestern University, PhD Thesis.
- Weilbach, Philip (1878). "Christian Gottlieb Kratzenstein Stub". Kunstindeks Danmark/Weilbachs Kunstnerleksikon.
