= Humli =

King of the Huns

Humli is a legendary king of the Huns who appears in the Hervarar Saga. He is the Grandfather of Hlod, illegitimate son of Heidrek, King of the Goths.

== Role in the saga ==
After Heideric's death, Humli tells his grandson to go to his father's funeral and demand his heritage. As Hlod arrives at Heideric's funeral he meets his brother Angantyr. Angantyr invites his brother to celebrate with him, but Hlod tells him that he didn't come to fast, but to demand his half of the Kingdom. Angantyr refuses his demand, instead offering him one third of the kingdom and a large number of slaves. He is interrupted by Gizur king of the Geats who says that Hlod does not deserves this as he is the "son of a slave" and a "Bastard". Offended, Hlod returns to his grandfather. Together, they build an army consisting of all horses and men of the steppe and attack the Goths, led by Angantyr's sister, a shieldmaid named Hervor. Although she fights bravely she is finally killed by the Huns. In the final battle Angantyr is supported by the Geats under Gizur, and after a long fight Hlod is killed by Angantyr.
