= Sifka =

Figure in Norse mythology

Sifka or Sifeca is a Hun princess in Norse mythology, the mother of the warrior Hlöd by Heidrek, King of the Geats.

She was the daughter of Humli, King of the Huns. After the Geatish Heidrek murdered the Gothic king Harald and his son Halfdan, taking control of the Gothic kingdom, he defeated the Hunnish king Humli. Thereafter, he captured Sifka, Humli's daughter, and raped her. As a result, Sifka became pregnant, was sent back to her father's kingdom, and bore a son whom she named Hlöd. Hlöd was born handsome and valiant. He was raised by his grandfather, the Hun King Humli, and was given weapons and horses as soon as he was born.

Upon hearing that Heidrek, his father, was dead, and that his half-brother Angantyr had been proclaimed king of the Goths, Hlöd's grandfather said to him that he had to go to the Gothic kingdom and claim his inheritance. Eventually, a fight ensued, which ultimately led to the death of his sister, Hervor, and to a battle between the Goths and the Huns, in which the Goths defeated the Huns.
