= Gizur =

Fictional character

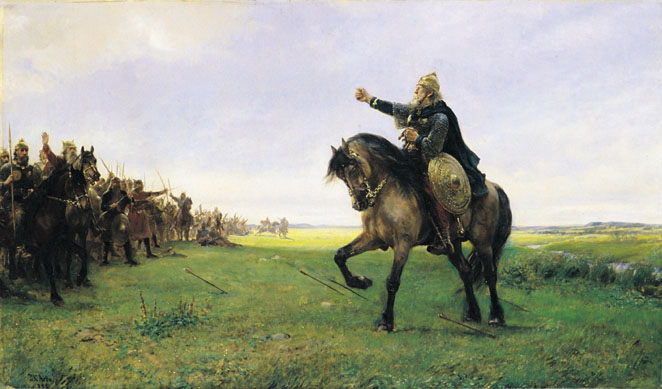
Gizur challenges the Huns by Peter Nicolai Arbo, 1886.

Gizur, Gizurr or Gissur was a King of the Geats. He appears in The Battle of the Goths and Huns, which is included in the Hervarar saga and in editions of the Poetic Edda. Gizur was the foster-father of Heidrek, who made a coup-d'état in Reidgotaland, the land of the Goths (see Oium and the Chernyakhov culture).

Ár kváðu Humla
Húnum ráða,
Gizur Gautum,
Gotum Angantý...

Translation:

In the old days, they said Humli
Ruled the Huns,
Gizur of the Geats,
of the Goths Angantyr...

Following the death of Heidrek by the hand of his slaves, his son Angantyr, who was the new king of the Goths, avenged him and held a great banquet in his memory. The aged Gizur, Heidrek's foster father, was among the kings who arrived at the Goth capital Arheimar on the Dniepr (Danpar) and participated in the banquet. Then Heidrek's illegitimate son Hlöd, who had been raised by his maternal grandfather Humli and had grown up among the Huns, conspired with his grandfather to claim his share of the inheritance, which included half of all Heidrek's property. Angantyr offered a great many riches and a third of the Goth kingdom, but before Hlöd could answer, Gizur reminded Angantyr that Hlöd was only a bastard son of a bondmaid and did not deserve such riches.

This offended Humli and caused an invasion of the Hunnish Horde, for which all males of 12 years or older were enlisted, effectively emptying the land of the Huns of all its fighting men (approximately 350,000 men), and prospects looked grim. At first a battle took place in the land of the Goths near Mirkwood, where there was a fortress under the command of Hervör, Angantyr's sister. In the battle Hervör was killed and her armies were defeated. After Angantyr heard of the defeat, Gizur rode out as a herald to the Huns, and when he saw them at a distance he called out and summoned them to another battle "on the Danube heath below the Hills of Ash". Gizur supported Angantyr and helped him fight the Horde, presumably with his own Geatish forces.

Since he helped the Goths, Hlöd mockingly called the king the Grýtingaliði, an Ostrogoth (Greutungi) warrior and "Angantyr's man":

Taki þér Gizur
Grýtingalinða,
mann Angantýs,
kominn af Árheimum.

Translation:

You be seized
Ostrogoth warrior,
Angantyr's man,
Arrived from Arheimar.
