= Hlöðskviða =

Old Norse heroic poem

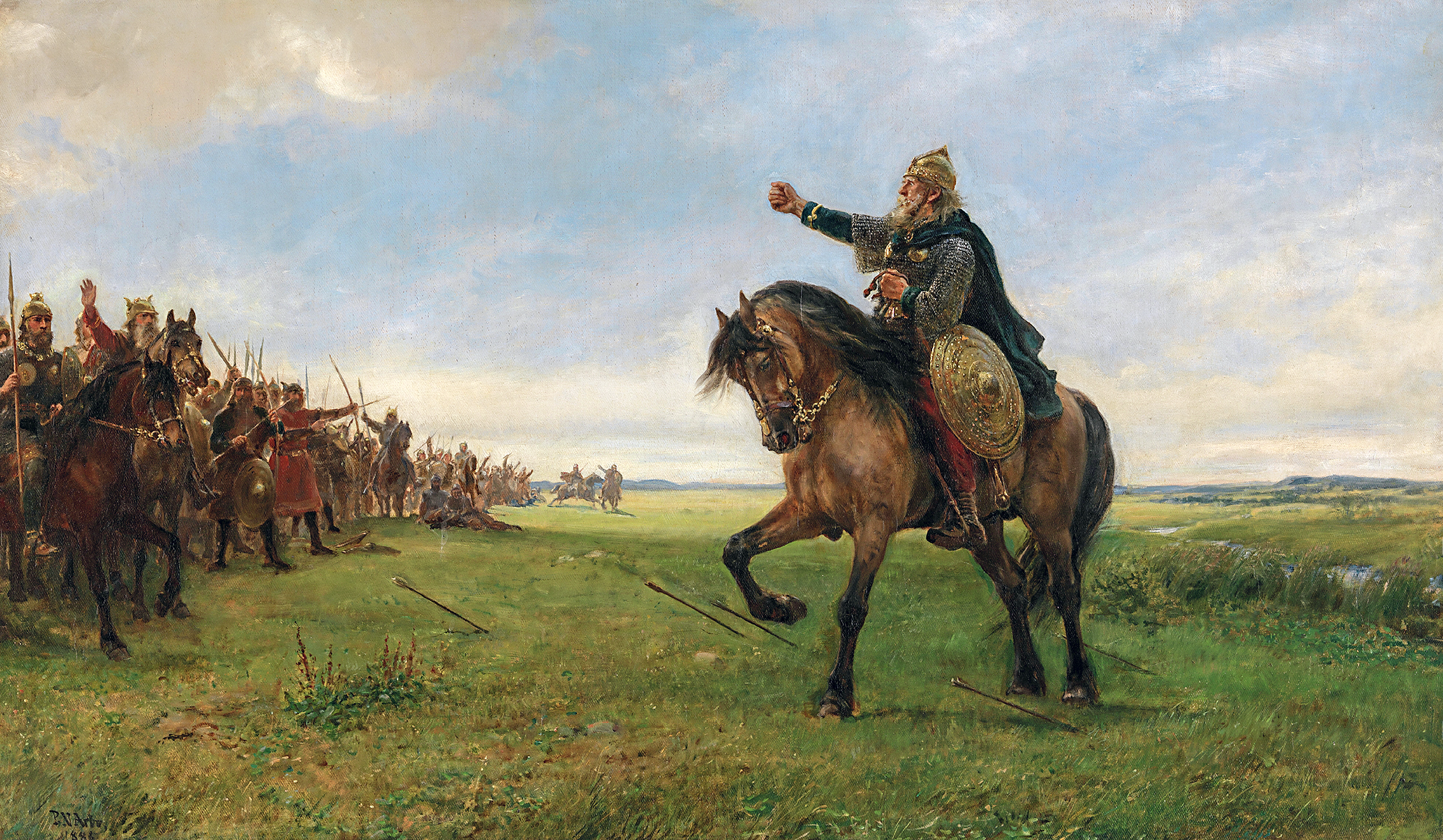
Gizur challenging the Huns according to the Hlöðskviða (Hunnenschlachtlied)

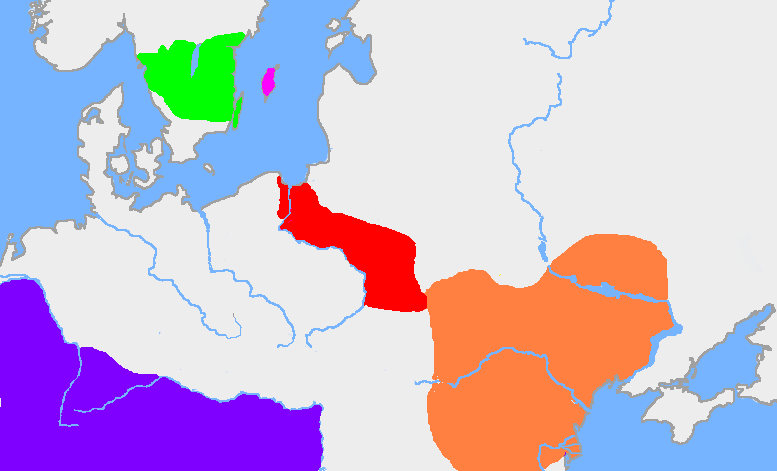
Land of the Geats (Götaland) The island of Gotland An older Gothic territory (see Gothiscandza) corresponding to the Wielbark culture in the early 3rd century The location of the Goths in the poem which corresponds to the Chernyakhov culture, in the 4th century (see also Oium) The Roman Empire

Hlöðskviða (also Hlǫðskviða and Hlǫðsqviða), known in English as The Battle of the Goths and Huns and occasionally known by its German name Hunnenschlachtlied, is an heroic poem in Old Norse found in Hervarar saga ok Heiðreks.

Many attempts have been made to try to fit the Hlöðskviða with known history, but it is an epic poem, telescoping and fictionalising history to a large extent; some verifiable historical information from the time are place names, surviving in Old Norse forms from the period 750–850, but it was probably collected later in Västergötland.

Most scholars place the tale sometime in the 4th and 5th centuries, with the battle occurring either in Central Europe near the Carpathian Mountains or further east in European Russia.

== Texts, historicity, and analysis ==
There are two main sources for the saga, "H", from the Hauksbók (A.M. 544) early 14th century; and "R", a 15th-century parchment (MS 2845). The final parts of the saga including Hlöðskviða are absent in H and truncated in R – the remainder of the text is found in better preserved 17th-century paper copies of these works.

The poem itself is thought to have originally been a stand-alone work, separate from the saga. It has several analogues, containing similar or related content, including the English Widsith, as well as Orvar-Odd's Saga and the Gesta Danorum.

The historicity of the "Battle of the Goths and Huns", including the identification of people, places, and events, has been a matter of scholarly investigation since the 19th century, with no clear answer. Locations proposed for the setting include a number of places around the Carpathian Mountains; the actual battle has been identified as either the Battle of the Catalaunian Plains (451 AD), between Flavius Aetius and the Visigoths under Theodoric I and the Huns under Attila; or a battle between the Gothic king Ostrogotha and the Gepid king Fastida; or a battle between the Langobards and the Vulgares (Bulgars) in which the Lombard king Agelmundus (Agelmund) was killed; or a post-Attila (d. 453) conflict between the Gepids and Huns, possibly during the reign of the Gepid Ardaric; another interpretation makes the Goths the Crimean Goths. The battle has alternatively been placed as early as 386 AD, a destruction of peoples under Odotheus in a battle on the River Danube. Similarities between the story in the saga and the Battle of Nedao have also been noted. The identification of persons in the poem with historical figures is equally confused. Additionally any historical date of the "Battle of Goths and Huns" (whatever the exact attribution to historical events) is several centuries earlier than the supposedly preceding events recorded in the saga.

== Text ==
The poem is preserved as 29 separate strophes or parts of strophes interspersed among the text in Hervarar saga ok Heiðreks, of which most are narrative, not speech. Much of the saga is now in prose, though it is thought that the original was verse, with some textual evidence in the prose for a verse original. Christopher Tolkien (Tolkien 1960) supposes that it originally formed a complete narrative in itself, outside of the context in which it is now found in the saga.

Some damaged verses were recorded differently by different editors, and the text shows signs of different dates of composition or recording in different parts of the text – including rich verses similar to those found in early eddaic poems such as Atlakviða or Hamðismál, whilst other lines are less rich.

Most editions number the stanzas, but the numbering may start from the first poetic stanza in the saga, not the poem.

=== Extracts ===
Heiðrekr, king of the Goths, had two sons, Angantýr and Hlöðr. Only Angantýr was legitimate, so he inherited his father's kingdom. Hlöðr, whose mother was the daughter of Humli, king of the Huns, and who was born and raised among the Huns, claimed half the inheritance. Angantýr refused to split evenly, and war ensued, claiming first Hervör, their sister, then Hlöðr himself as casualties.

The first verses frame the peoples and their rulers. It is noteworthy that the Geats (Gautar) and their king Gizurr have been inserted directly after the Huns, where one logically would expect the Goths and their king Angantyr to appear.

Ár kváðu Humla
Húnum ráða,
Gizur Gautum,
Gotum Angantý,
Valdarr Dǫnum,
en Vǫlum Kjár,
Alrekr inn frœkni
enskri þjóðu.

Translation:

Of old they said Humli
of Huns was the ruler,
Gizur the Gautar,
of Goths Angantyr,
Valdar the Danes ruled,
and the Valir Kjár,
Alrek the valiant
the English people

— (Tolkien 1960, (75) pp.45–6)

Valdar is also named as a king of the Danes in Guðrúnarkviða II.

After Heiðrekr's death, Hlöðr travels to Árheimar to claim half of the Gothic realm as his inheritance. His demand refers to the forest on the boundary separating the Goths and the Huns and to a "holy grave", apparently an important sanctuary of the Goths, but its background is unknown.

hrís þat it mæra,
er Myrkviðr heitir,
grǫf þá ina helgu,
er stendr á Goðþjóðu,
stein þann inn fagra,
er stendr á stǫðum Danpar,
hálfar herváðir,
þær er Heiðrekr átti,
lǫnd ok lýða
ok ljósa bauga.

Translation:

the renowned forest
that is named Mirkwood,
the hallowed grave
in Gothland standing,
that fair-wrought stone
beside the Dniepr,
half the armor
owned by Heidrek,
land and liegemen
and lustrous rings!

— (Tolkien 1960, (82) pp.48–9)

Angantýr offers Hlöðr a third of his realm, and Gizur, Heiðrekr's old foster-father, says that this is more than enough for the son of a slave. On Hlöðr's return to the Hunnic realm, his grandfather Humli is enraged at the insult and gathers the army of the Huns.

The poem ends with Angantýr finding his brother dead:

Bǫlvat es okkr, bróðir,
bani em ek þinn orðinn;
þat mun æ uppi,
illr er dómr norna.

Translation:

We are cursed, kinsman,
your killer am I!
It will be never forgotten;
the Norns's doom is evil.

— (Tolkien 1960, (103) pp.57–8)

== See also ==
- Oium, the Gothic realm in Scythia, overrun by the Huns in the 370s
- Poetic Edda; the poem generally does not appear in Eddic poetry collections (exceptions include Vigfússon & Powell 1883 and Jónsson 1956), but contains some poetry in a similar style
