= Hlöd =

Norse mythological figure

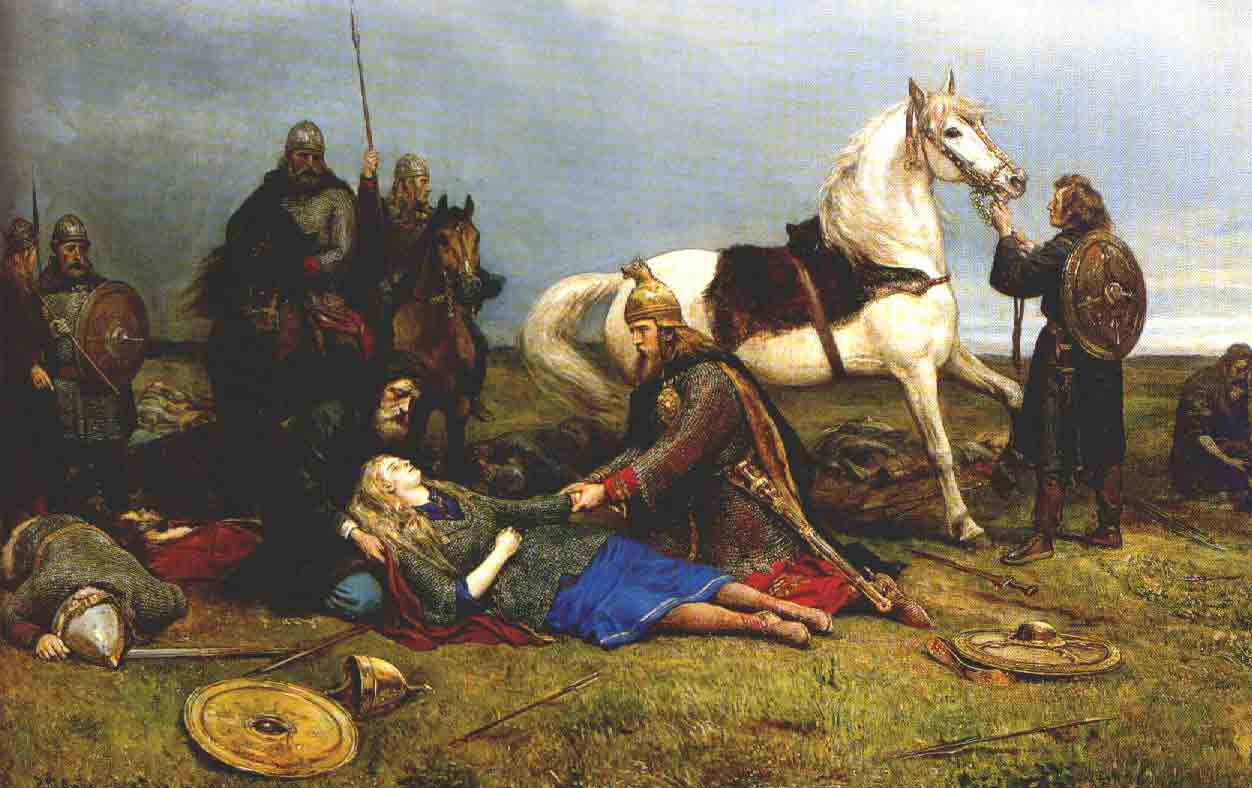
Hlöd has found his dead sister Hervor after the battle with the Goths at Myrkviðr. A painting by Peter Nicolai Arbo

Hlöd or Hlod was the illegitimate son of Heidrek, the king of the Geats, in Norse mythology.

He appears in the Hervarar saga and probably also as Hlith in Widsith, line 115, together with his father Heiðrekr (Heathoric), half-brother Angantyr (Incgentheow), and his mother Sifka (Sifeca).

== Claiming His Inheritance ==
Hlöd had grown up with his grandfather Humli, the king of the Huns, and he was both handsome and valiant. As soon as he was born he was given weapons and horses, as was the custom of the time.

When Hlöd heard that his father Heidrek was dead and that his half-brother Angantyr had been proclaimed king of the Goths, his grandfather Humli said that Hlod had to go to Arheimar and demand his rightful inheritance.

Hlöd arrived to Arheimar with many Hunnish warriors. He found a man outside of the hall and asked him to go inside and tell Angantyr that his brother wished to see him.

When King Angantyr learnt of who was waiting outside for him, he cast down his knife, took his mailcoat, his white shield in one hand and Tyrfing in the other. Then he asked Hlöd to come in and drink with them in honour of their dead father.

However, Hlöd answered that he had not come to feast, he wanted half of everything that Angantyr had inherited from their father: cow and calf, handmills, tools and weapons, treasures, slaves, bondmaids, sons and daughters, Myrkviðr, the grave, the carved stone beside Dniepr, Heidrek's armour, lands, liegemen and rings.

Angantyr refused to share with Hlöd and said that he had no right to inherit, but in recompense Hlöd would get lances, wealth, cattle, a thousand thralls, a thousand horses and a thousand armored bondsmen. Before leaving all of them would receive riches and a maid.

Hlöd would get his measure in silver and gold, and he would be given a whole third of the land of the Goths to rule.

However, Gizur Grytingalidi, the aged king of the Geats, who was visiting in order to bid farewell to his dead foster-son Heidrek, thought that Angantyr was too generous. Gizur stated that Hlöd was only a bastard and the son of a slave-girl, and should not receive so princely a gift.

Offended by being called a bastard and a slave-girl's son, Hlöd returned to the Huns and to Humli. He told Humli that Angantyr had refused to share the kingdom with him, and when Humli insisted he also said that he had been called the son of a slave.

== Mustering the Horde ==
Humli decided that they muster all the might of the Huns and attack the Goths. As soon as spring arrived they gathered an army so vast, that the steppes were depleted of men of fighting age. Every man who could carry arms down to twelve-year-olds, and every horse from two years of age and older. All in all the Huns mustered a horde of 343,200 mounted warriors.

== The Death of Hervor, Hlöd's Sister ==
When the horde was gathered they rode through Myrkviðr which separated Reidgotaland from the land of the Huns. As the horde came out of the forest they arrived at a populous country of flat plains. On the plains there was a fortress with a strong garrison commanded by Hervor, the sister of Angantyr and Hlöd, together with Ormar, her foster-father.

One morning as the sun was rising above the steppes, Hervor stood on a watchtower and saw a great cloud storm rising southwards over the forest. It hid the sun for a long time. Suddenly, she saw under the cloud a mass of gold. There were gilded helmets, shields and corselets and she realized that it was the horde which had arrived.

Hervor asked the trumpeter to blow a summons to gather the forces. Then she told Ormar to ride and meet the Huns and challenge them to do battle in front of the southern gate. Ormar rode to the Goths and told them that they would do battle outside the southern gate.

Outside that gate, there was a mighty battle, and since the horde was much larger, the Goths fell and finally Hervor was slain. When Ormar saw her die he retreated together with all those who were faint of heart. He rode day and night to reach king Angantyr in Arheimar.

== The Goths Prepare ==
As the Huns pillaged and burnt far and wide in Reidgotaland, Ormar arrived at Arheimar and related that the marches were burning at the hands of the Huns and that his sister was dead. Angantyr's lips were drawn back and said that his brother had not treated Hervor like a sister, and then he watched his small company and stated that the more men one needs the less one has. Gizur, the aged King of the Geats, said that he would fight for Angantyr and he would ask for no recompense.

Heidrek had instated a law that if an army invaded a land and the king of that country marked a field with hazel poles, the marauding army would stop pillaging until there had been battle inside the poles.

The old Gizur armed himself with good weapons and leapt on his horse like a young man. Then he asked where Angantyr desired to meet the Huns. Angantyr answered that he wished to meet them on the plains of the Danube below the Hills of Ash, where the Goths had oft been victorious.

Býð ek yðr at Dylgju
ok á Dúnheiði
orrostu undir
Jassarfjöllum;
hræ sé yðr
at hái hverjum,
ok láti svá Óðinn flein fljúga,
sem ek fyrir mæli

Gizur rode so close to the Huns that they could hear him and shouted that Odin was angry with them and that they were doomed.

Hlod cried that they should seize Gizur, but Humli said that lone heralds must not be hurt.

Gizur called out that the Goths were afraid of neither the Huns nor their bows, and then he hastened to Angantyr to report about the size of the horde.

Angantyr sent messengers to every part of the land to summon every able-bodied man. He then marched to the Danube with his great army and met the great army of the Huns.

== The Great Battle ==
They fought for eight days. No one could count the fallen but still no captains had been slain. Day and night the armies clashed around Angantyr, and the fight grew more and more bitter. The Huns became more and more ferocious as they knew that they would not survive a defeat. The Goths, on the other hand, were fighting for their freedom and for the land where they were born.

When the eighth day ended, the Goths pushed forward breaking the Hunnic lines. The Huns lost their courage as they saw Angantyr ride through the lines slashing and cutting men and horses with Tyrfing. Angantyr and Hlod met and Hlod fell, as well as Humli.

The Huns fled but the Goths pursued them and filled the rivers with bodies so that they choked and this caused a flood which filled the valleys with dead men and horses.

Angantyr searched among the slain and finally found his brother. He stated that cruel is the doom of the Norns when brother slays brother.

Bölvat er okkr, bróðir,
bani em ek þinn orðinn,
þat mun æ uppi,
illr er dómr norna.
