= Tofa =

Tofa or TOFA may refer to:

- Tofa language, a Turkic language spoken in Russia's Irkutsk Oblast
- Bashir Tofa (1947–2022), a Nigerian politician
- TOFA, Tall oil fatty acids
- Tofa, Nigeria, a local government area of Kano state, Nigeria
- Tofa (Poetic Edda), the wife of Angantyr and mother of Hervor in the Poetic Edda
- Tofa Fakunle (born 1995), a Canadian soccer player
