= Tofa (Poetic Edda) =

Tófa is the wife of Angantyr and mother of Hervor in Norse mythology. She is mentioned only once in Hervararkviða, part of Heiðreks saga, otherwise known as the Tyrfing Cycle of Old Norse legends.

== Appearance in Heiðreks saga ==
Tófa is mentioned only once, in the legendary saga of Hervor's Waking of Angantyr:

Vaki, Angantýr! || vekr þik Hervǫr,
eingadóttir || ykkr Tófu!

Translation:

Awaken, Angantyr! It is Hervor who awakens you,
your only daughter by Tófa!

The name is thought to be a shortened form of Þorfríðr, whose first element is the deity name Thor and whose second is an Old Norse word meaning 'beautiful'.

== See also ==
- Hervarar saga ok Heiðreks
- J. R. R. Tolkien
- Legendary saga
- Norse saga
- Prose Edda

== Other sources ==
- Henrikson, Alf (1998) Stora mytologiska uppslagsboken (Bokförlaget Forum - Bonnier AB) ISBN 978-9137113463

== Related Reading ==
- Vigfússon, Gudbranðour (with F. York Powell) (1883) Corpus Poeticum Boreale: The Poetry of the Old Northern Tongue, from the Earliest Times to the Thirteenth Century, Volume 1, Eddic Poetry (Oxford: Clarendon Press)
