= Hervarar saga ok Heiðreks =

Germanic legendary saga

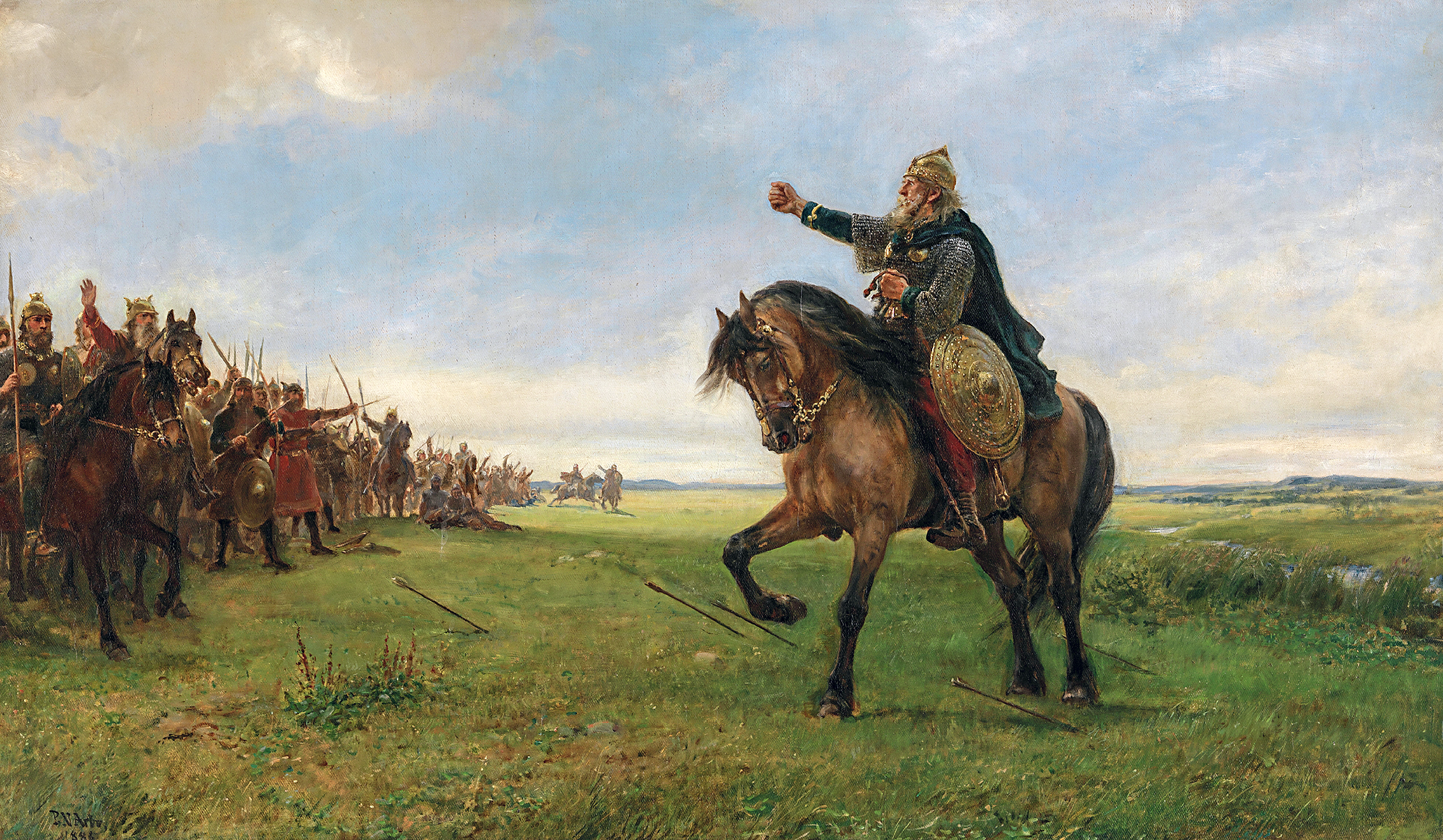
"Neither the Huns nor their hornbows make us afraid!" The Geatish king Gizur challenges the invading Huns to a pitched battle on behalf of the Goths, from the Scandinavian epic poem Battle of the Goths and the Huns, which preserves place names from the Gothic rule in South-Eastern Europe. Painting by Peter Nicolai Arbo, 1886.

Hervarar saga ok Heiðreks (The Saga of Hervör and Heidrek) is a legendary saga from the 13th century combining matter from several older sagas in Germanic heroic legend. It tells of wars between the Goths and the Huns during the 4th century. The final part of the saga, which was likely composed separately from and later than the rest, is a source for Swedish medieval history.

The saga may be most appreciated for its memorable imagery, as seen in a quotation from one of its translators, Nora Kershaw Chadwick, on the invasion of the Huns:

Hervör standing at sunrise on the summit of the tower and looking southward towards the forest; Angantyr marshalling his men for battle and remarking dryly that there used to be more of them when mead drinking was in question; great clouds of dust rolling over the plain, through which glittered white corslet and golden helmet, as the Hunnish host came riding on.

The text contains several poetic sections: the Hervararkviða, on Hervor's visit to her father's grave and her retrieval of the sword Tyrfing; another, the Hlöðskviða, on the battle between Goths and Huns; and a third, containing the riddles of Gestumblindi.

It has inspired later writers and derivative works, such as J. R. R. Tolkien when shaping his legends of Middle-earth. His son, Christopher Tolkien translated the work into English as The Saga of King Heidrek the Wise.

== Manuscripts ==
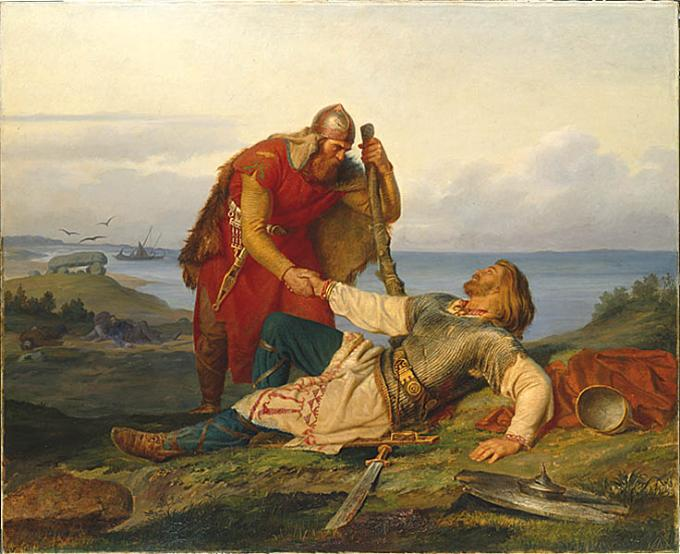
Orvar-Odd and Hjalmar bid each other farewell Mårten Eskil Winge (1866).

There are three medieval recensions of the saga, each of which is an independent witness to its lost archetype, and which together are the basis for all post-medieval manuscripts of the saga. These are known as versions R, H, and U. The saga continued to be copied in manuscript into the nineteenth century, and the relationships of the surviving manuscripts and the ways in which they vary has been studied in detail.

R is the version found in the fifteenth-century parchment manuscript Reykjavík, Stofnun Árna Magnússonar, MS 2845, formerly held in the Danish Royal Library at Copenhagen. The manuscript is fragmentary, today containing the saga only into chapter 12, that is within the poem on the battle of Goths and Huns. R is in most respects closest witness to the lost archetype of Heiðreks saga.

U is the version best attested in a seventeenth-century paper manuscript, Uppsala, University Library, R 715. Another early witness to parts of this version is the seventeenth-century paper manuscript Copenhagen, Den Arnamagnæanske Samling, AM 203 fol. This contains a copy of R, but where R breaks off it then continues with text from a common ancestor with R 715. The version dramatically reworks the saga, adding a new opening chapter and including alterations sourced from other sagas, including from the rímur reworking of the same tale, the Hervarar Rímur.

H (Hauksbók: Reykjavík, Stofnun Árna Magnússonar, AM 544), dates to c. 1325. This parchment manuscript is today fragmentary, containing the story up to the end of Gestumblindi's second riddle, but two early copies (AM 281 4to) and (AM 597b) record parts of H now lost. H is a conflation of an early version of the saga similar to that preserved in R, and the U-version of the saga. Thus although it is found in the earliest surviving manuscript, H is the third known recension of the saga.

There are many other paper manuscripts of the saga that were copied in the seventeenth century from the manuscripts mentioned above. These include AM 192, AM 193, AM 202 k, AM 354 4to, AM 355 4to, and AM 359 a 4to.

== Synopsis ==
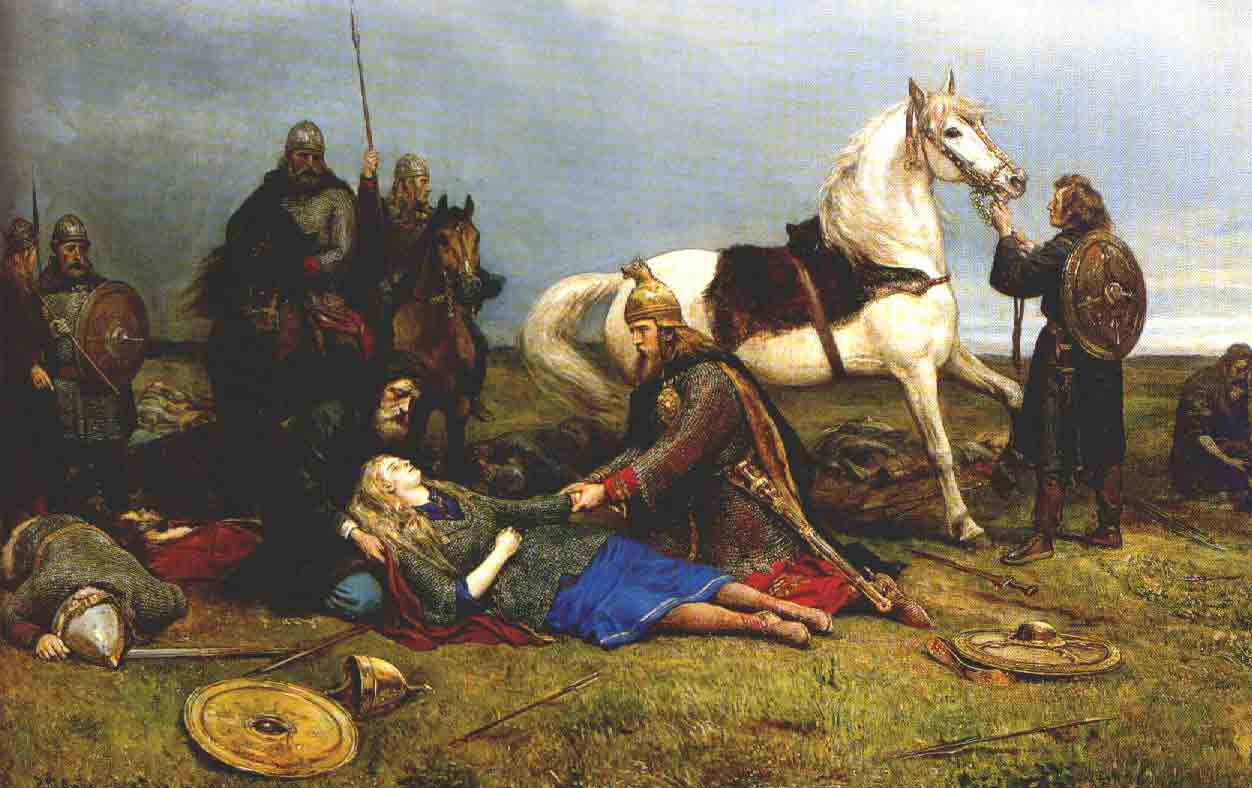
Hervor's death Peter Nicolai Arbo

All the different manuscripts of the saga tell a similar story, though with many variations of detail (in particular, the U- and H-versions open with a mythic tale of Guðmundr of Glæsisvellir).

The saga deals with the sword Tyrfingr and how it was forged and cursed by the dwarfs Dvalinn and Durin for king Svafrlami. Later, Svafrlami loses it to the berserker Arngrímr of Bolmsö. The sword provides a common link throughout the saga, being passed down through the generations in Arngrímr's family, particularly the saga's main protagonists, Hervör and her son Heiðrekr. This magical sword shares a common property with other mythological weapons such as Dáinsleif and Bödvar Bjarki's sword in Hrolf Kraki's Saga that, once it has been drawn, it cannot be sheathed until it has drawn blood.

Arngrímr passes Tyrfingr to his son Angantýr. Angantýr dies during a holmganga (duel) on Samsø against the Swedish hero Hjálmarr, whose friend Örvar-Oddr buries the cursed sword in a barrow with Angantýr's body.

Tyrfingr is retrieved from the barrow by Angantýr's daughter, the shieldmaiden Hervör, who summons her dead father to claim her inheritance. This section mixes prose with extensive quotations from a poem known today as Hervararkviða, which largely comprises dialogue between Hervör and her father.

Then the saga relates how Hervör marries and has a son Heiðrekr, who becomes king of Reiðgotaland. Heiðrekr spends his youth systematically contravening the good advice given to him by his father and fathering sons on several different women. Eventually, he settles down and becomes a wise king. At this point in the saga, Heiðrekr is killed after a riddle contest with Óðinn (who is disguised as Gestumblindi). The riddles of Hervarar saga ok Heiðreks are all in verse; sometimes called Heiðreks gátur, they constitute the main surviving evidence for medieval Scandinavian riddling.

After Heiðrekr's death, his sons Angantýr and Hlöðr wage a great battle over their father's inheritance. Hlöðr is aided by the Huns, to whom his mother belonged, but nonetheless Angantýr defeats and kills him. This section of the saga too quotes extensively from a poem describing this battle between the Huns and Goths.

The end of the saga is only preserved in the U-recension. This version relates that Angantýr had a son, Heiðrekr Ulfhamr, who was king of Reiðgotaland for a long time. Heiðrekr's daughter Hildr was the mother of Hálfdanr the Valiant, who was the father of Ívarr Víðfaðmi. After Ívarr, there follows a list of Swedish kings, both real and semi-legendary, ending with Philip Halstensson. However, this king-list was probably composed separately from the rest of the saga and integrated into it in later redactions.

== Origins and development ==
The saga tells the history of the family of Hervör and Heidrek over several generations. Then, the story turns to the sons of Arngrim, a Viking Age tale also told in the Hyndluljóð. Next, the tale tells of Hervör, daughter of Angantyr; then of Heidrek son of Hervör. At this point, the setting of the tale changes from the Kingdom of the Goths to somewhere in Eastern Europe (c. 4th–5th century); finally, the tale returns to the historically later date. Kershaw considers that the latter part of the tale involving the Huns and Goths has an origin separate from that of the earlier parts and, in chronological time, is actually taking place several centuries earlier.

In addition to attempts to understand the relationship between the events in the saga and real-world historical characters, events, and places (see § Historicity), the manuscripts and contents are also useful to research into the attitudes and cultures of the periods in which they were composed or written down. Hall thinks the text derives ultimately from oral tradition, not from the invention of an author.

Hall believes the poem Hervararkviða (or 'The Waking of Angantýr') was composed specifically for a narrative closely akin to the tale told in Heiðreks saga, as it is consistent in style and forms a consistent narrative link between the events in the tale. Tolkien considers it unequivocally older than the saga itself. The exact nature of the original underlying narrative for the poem is a matter of scholarly debate. Some passages of the poetry in Heiðreks saga also appear in variant forms in Örvar-Odd's saga (lines 97–9, 103-6), and the outline story of the duel between Arngrímr and Hjálmarr also appears in books 5 and 6 of the Gesta Danorum. There are also elemental plot similarities between the saga and Sturlaugs saga starfsama up to the point that a protagonist receives the magic sword from a female figure; Hall surmises that the two may share a narrative origin.

The section of the saga concerning Heiðrekr's disregard for his father's advice is common to a widely known family of tales (called by Knut Liestøl "The Good Counsels of the Father"). In general there are three counsels; in the saga, a set of three (1st, 2nd, and 6th) fit together. Tolkien proposes that after the counsels were introduced into the work, further counsels were added, further extending that theme through the saga.

The poem Hlöðskviða (or "Battle of the Goths and Huns") has numerous analogues that overlap in topical coverage. The oldest of these is thought to be the Old English poem Widsith. Several of the characters who appear in the battle of the Goths and Huns appear are mentioned in this poem: Heiðrekr (Heaþoric), Sifka (Sifeca), Hlǫðr (Hliðe), and Angantýr (Incgenþeow). Tolkien considers that the poem, though seemingly considerably altered over time, once formed part of a continuous poetic narrative that gave a complete description of the Goth-Hun conflict and existed as a separate work.

=== Historicity of "The Battle of the Goths and Huns" ===
In the 17th century, when the Norse sagas became a subject of interest to scholars, they were initially taken as reasonably accurate depictions of historical events. Later, in the 19th and 20th centuries, scholars realized that they were not completely historically accurate.

Carl Christian Rafn (Rafn 1850) considered that the battle between Goths and Huns was a legendary retelling of the battle between the Gothic king Ostrogotha and the Gepid king Fastida, which was described by Jordanes in Ch. 17 of his history of the Goths. Richard Heinzel (Heinzel 1887), in his analysis Über die Hervararsaga, suggested the battle described was the same as the Battle of the Catalaunian Plains (451 CE), identifying Angantyr as the Roman general Aetius and Hlothr as the Frankish Chlodio, with the incorporation of parts of the general Litorius, whereas the Vandal Geiseric is the prototype for Gizurr Grytingalithi. Rudolf Much (Much 1889) proposed alternative attributions for the battles. One, recorded by Paul the Deacon, took place between the Langobards and the Vulgares Bulgars; in that battle, Agelmundus (Agelmund) was killed, and his sister (conflated with Hervor) is taken prisoner. In the other battle, the new Langobardian king Lamissio is victorious; Much conflates this battle with that of the Goths and Huns. He also identifies the battlefields to be north of the River Danube in the Carpathian Mountains, near modern-day Kraków.

In the latter half of the 19th century, Heinzel's theory was predominant and widely accepted. Later, Gustav Neckel and Gudmund Schütte further analyzed the textual and historical information. Neckel placed the events after the death of Attila (d. 453 CE) during the later Gepid-Hun conflicts, whereas Schütte identified either Heithrekr or Heathoric as transformations of the name of the Gepid king Ardaric. In the early 1900s, Henrik Schück and Richard Constant Boer both rejected Heinzel's attribution and the link with Attila. Schück split the legend of the strife between brothers from that of the Goth-Hun war, as well as their geographic locations, and identified both sites as being in southern Russia. Boer associated the Dunheithr with the Daugava River but placed the battle further north in central European Russia, in the Valdai Hills.

Further scholarship in the 20th century added more name and place attributions, with Otto von Friesen and Arwid Johannson returning to the western end of the Carpathians; Hermann Schneider placing the Goths in the Black Sea area (Crimean Goths); and Niels Clausen Lukman reanalyzing the tale, not in the context of Jordanes' history but in that of Ammianus Marcellinus. Lukman shifted the date to 386 CE, when a mass migration of peoples under Odotheus (conflated with Hlothr) was destroyed by the Romans on the Danube; in his reconstruction Heithrekr is the visigothic Athanaric. In an analysis of parts of the tale, (Tolkien 1953) identifies the place where Angantyr revenges his father's (Heithrekr) killing by slaves as being at the foot of the Carpathians, using linguistic analysis based on consonant shifts (see Grimm's Law) in the term "Harvath Mountains". The place Árheimar in Danparstathir mentioned in association is unidentified, though "Danpar-" has been assumed to be some form of the river Dnieper. Similarities with the Battle of Nedao (454 CE) have also been noted.

It is a testimony to its great age that names appear in genuinely Germanic forms and not in any form remotely influenced by Latin. Names for Goths appear that ceased to be used after 390 CE, such as Grýting (cf. the Latin form Greutungi) and Tyrfing (cf. the Latin form Tervingi). The events take place where the Goths lived during the wars with the Huns. The Gothic capital Árheimar is located on the Dniepr (...á Danparstöðum á þeim bæ, er Árheimar heita...), King Heidrek dies in the Carpathians (...und Harvaða fjöllum), and the battle with the Huns takes place on the plains of the Danube (...á vígvöll á Dúnheiði í Dylgjudölum). The mythical Myrkviðr [Mirkwood] that separates the Goths from the Huns appears to correspond to the Maeotian marshes.

== Influence, legacy, and adaptions ==
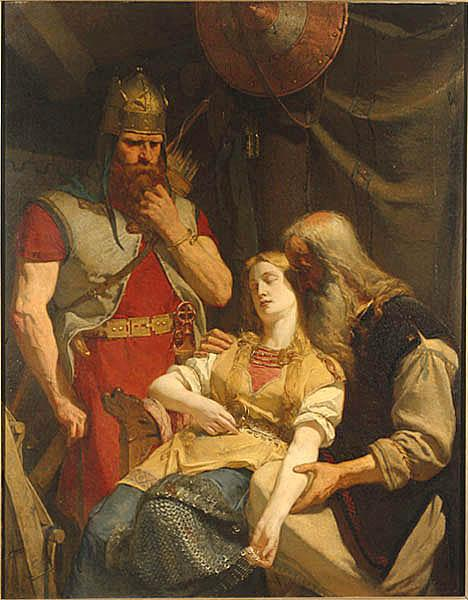
Örvar-Oddr informs Ingeborg about Hjalmar's death August Malmström (1859)

=== Old Icelandic literature ===
Hervarar saga ok Heiðreks was one source for the fifteenth-century Icelandic poem Ormars rímur (probably via a now-lost prose saga), in which the hero Ormarr visits his father's burial mound to convince his dead father to give him his sword.

=== Other Scandinavian literature ===
Traditions appearing in the saga have also been preserved in several Scandinavian medieval ballads and rímur, i.e. the Danish Angelfyr og Helmer kamp, the Faroese Hjálmar og Angantýr, Arngríms synir, Gátu ríma, and in the Swedish Kung Speleman. The Faroese ballad, Gátu ríma ('riddle poem') was collected in the 19th century; it is thought by some scholars to derive from the riddle-contest in the saga.

=== Hickes' "The Waking of Angantyr" ===
At the beginning of the 18th century, George Hickes published a translation of the Hervararkviða in his Linguarum veterum septentrionalium thesaurus grammatico-criticus et archæologicus. Working from Verelius's 1671 translations (Verelius 1671), with the aid of a Swedish scholar, he presented the entire poem in half-line verse similar to that used in Old English poetry (see Old English metre). It was the first full Icelandic poem translated into English, and it aroused interest in England in such works. The work was reprinted in Dryden's Poetical Miscellanies (1716) and by Thomas Percy in amended form as "The Incantation of Hervor" in his Five Pieces of Runic Poetry (1763).

Hickes's publication inspired various "Gothic" and "Runic odes" based on the poem, of varying quality and faithfulness to the original. (Wawn 2002) states "[T]he cult of the ubiquitous eighteenth-century poem known as 'The Waking of Angantyr' can be traced directly to its door."

=== Other adaptions ===
The Hervararkviða poem was translated fairly closely into verse by Beatrice Barmby and included in her Gísli Súrsson: a Drama (1900); and into a more "Old English" style by (Smith-Dampier 1912) in The Norse King's Bridal. Hjálmar's Death-Song was translated by W. Herbert in his Select Icelandic Poetry.

The French poet Charles-Marie-René Leconte de Lisle adapted the Hervararkviða in the poem "L’Épée d’Angantyr" [Angantyr's Sword] in his Poèmes barbares.

Swedish composer Wilhelm Stenhammar wrote the opera Tirfing as an adaptation of the Hervor-section of the saga using her as the opera's lead protagonist.

=== J. R. R. Tolkien ===
There is much in this saga that readers of J. R. R. Tolkien's work will recognize, most importantly the riddle contest. There are, for instance, warriors similar to the Rohirrim, brave shieldmaidens, Mirkwood, haunted barrows yielding enchanted swords (see Barrow-downs), an epic battle, and two dwarfs named Dwalin and Durin.

reference	edition	translation	notes
Verelius, Olaus, ed. (1671), Hervarar Saga på Gammal Götska, Upsala: Henricus Curio	yes	Latin/Swedish	Jón Rúgmann probably assisted with the translation
Björnsson, Stefán, ed. (1785), Hervararsaga ok Heidrekskongs. Copenhagen. Peter Friederich Suhm.	yes	Latin	Stefán Björnsson edited and translated both prose and poetry. Suhm published the work and added background chapters.
Rafn, C. C., ed. (1829–1830), Fornaldar Sögur Norðurlanda: Eptir gömlum handritum, Copenhagen	yes	no	Saga Heiðreks konúngs ens vitra, vol. I, pp. 513–533
Ásmundarson, Valdimar, ed. (1891), "Hervarar saga ok Heiðreks", Fornaldarsögur Nordrlanda, vol. 1, S. Kristjánsson, pp. 307–	yes		
Helgason, Jón, ed. (1924), "Heiðreks saga: Hervarar saga ok Heiðreks konungs", Samfund til udgivelse af gammel nordisk litteratur, vol. 48, Copenhagen: Samfund til udgivelse af gammel nordisk litteratur	yes	no	contains H in normalised Old Norse, a parallel edition of R in diplomatic transcription, and a separate text of U in diplomatic edition
Jónsson, Guðni; Vilhjálmsson, Bjarni, eds. (1943–44), Fornaldarsögur Norðurlanda, vol. 3 vols, Reyjkjavík: Bókaútgáfan Forni	yes	no	based on the R-text. Hervarar saga ok Heiðreks
Hervarar saga ok Heiðreks, ed. by Hannah Burrows, in Poetry in 'Fornaldarsögur': Part 1, ed. by Margaret Clunies Ross, Skaldic Poetry of the Scandinavian Middle Ages, 8 (Turnhout: Brepols, 2017), pp. 367–487.	yes	English	verse only
Kershaw, Nora (1921), Stories and Ballads of the Far Past, Cambridge University Press, pp. 79–150, e-text	no	yes	based on the H-text. Presented alongside the Old Norse in: Hervarar Saga og Heiðreks [The Saga of Hervör and Heithrek ]
Christopher Tolkien, ed. and trans. (1960), The Saga of King Heidrek the Wise (PDF) (London: Nelson).	yes	English	based on the R-text
Hervarar saga ok Heiðreks [R] -and- Saga Heiðreks konúngs ens vitra [H] [The Saga of Hervor & King Heidrek the Wise], translated by Tunstall, Peter, 2005	yes	English	
Two Sagas of Mythical Heroes: Hervor and Heidrek and Hrólf Kraki and His Champions, translated by Crawford, Jackson, Indianapolis: Hackett, 2021, pp. 1–58	no	English	
Petersen, N.M.; Thorarensen, G., eds. (1847), Hervarar saga ok Heiðreks konungs (in German and Old Norse), vol. 3	yes	German	
Rafn, Carl Christian (1850), "VII. La saga de Hervor", Antiquités russes d'après les monuments historiques des Islandais et des Anciens Scandinaves (in French), vol. 1, De l'imprimerie des frères Berling, pp. 109–, hdl:2027/mdp.39015046383231		French	
Heinzel, Richard (1887), "Über die Hervararsaga", Sitzungsberichte der Kaiserlichen Akademie der Wissenschaften (in German), vol. CXIV, pp. 417–519		German	
"Askiboyrgion oros", Zeitschrift für deutsches Altertum und deutsche Literatur (in German), pp. 1–12, 1889		German	
Heusler, Andreas; Ranish, Wilhelm, eds. (1903), "I Das Lied von der Hunnenschlact", Eddica Minora - Dichtungen eddischer Art aus den Fornaldarsögur und anderen Prosawerken (in German and Old Norse), F. W. Ruhfus, pp. 1–		German	
*Vigfússon, Gudbrand; Powell, F. York, eds. (1883), "Eddic Poetry", Corpus Poeticum Boreale: The Poetry of the Old Northern Tongue (in Old Norse and English), vol. 1, Oxford: Oxford University Press, pp. 85–91, 163–167, 248–352	yes		verse only
Kershaw, N., ed. (1922), "13. The Battle of the Goths and the Huns", Anglo-Saxon and Norse poems, Cambridge [Eng.] The University press	no	English	verse only
Leconte de Lisle, Charles Marie René (1925) [1862], "L'Epée d'Angantyr", Oeovres de Leconte de Lisle Peomes Barbares (in French), pp. 73–6		French	verse only
