= Hervararkviða =

Old Norse poem

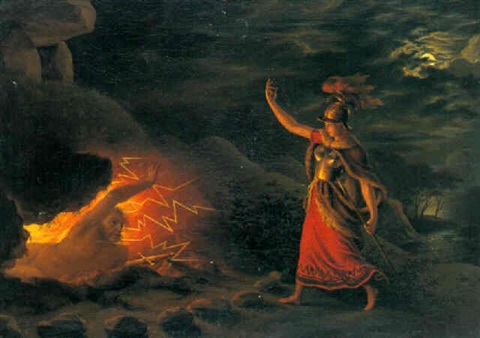
Hervör wakes her father Angantýr's ghost from his barrow to demand the cursed sword Tyrfing. Oil painting by Christian Gottlieb Kratzenstein-Stub (1783–1816)

Hervararkviða, (published in English translation as The Waking of Angantyr, or The Incantation of Hervor) is an Old Norse poem from the Hervarar saga, and which is sometimes included in editions of the Poetic Edda.

The poem is about the shieldmaiden Hervor and her visiting her father Angantyr's ghost at his barrow. She does so in order to make him give her an heirloom, the cursed sword Tyrfing.

For a fuller analysis of the text as a whole, including manuscript sources, and stemmatics, see Hervarar saga ok Heiðreks.

== Translations and other adaptions ==
As well as appearing in translations of the Hervarar saga, the poem is also found translated in some editions of the Poetic Edda including (Auden & Taylor 1969), and (Vigfússon & Powell 1883)

A key scene in the later medieval Ormars rímur, in which the hero awakens his father from the dead to retrieve his sword, was probably inspired by Hervararkviða.

The poem was first translated into English by George Hickes in the early 18th century, as "The Waking of Angantyr", and republished in amended form by Thomas Percy as "The Incantation of Hervor" (1763). These works led to the poem's popularity as a subject for poetic translation in the late eighteenth century.

Charles Marie René Leconte de Lisle created a French translation in 1862 as L'Epée d'Angantyr [The Sword of Angantyr].

=== Translations and interpretations ===
- Percy, Thomas (1763), "The Incantation of Hervor", Five pieces of Runic Poetry Translated from the Islandic Language, Printed for R. and J. Dodsley, in Pall-mall.
- Leconte de Lisle, Charles Marie René (1925) [1862], "L'Epée d'Angantyr", Oeovres de Leconte de Lisle Peomes Barbares (in French), pp. 73–6
- Smith-Dampier, E.M. (1912), "The Waking of Angantheow", The Norse Kings Bridal, pp. 3–9
- Auden, W.H.; Taylor, Paul B., eds. (1969), The Elder Edda: A Selection, London: Faber., ISBN 0-571-09066-4
  - Revised and expanded as Auden, W.H.; Taylor, Paul B., eds. (1981), Norse Poems, London: Athlone, ISBN 0-485-11226-4
- Vigfússon, Gudbrand; Powell, F. York, eds. (1883), "Eddic Poetry", Corpus Poeticum Boreale: The Poetry of the Old Northern Tongue, vol. 1, Oxford: Oxford University Press

== Bibliography ==
- Roesdahl, Else; Meulengracht, Sorensen Preben; Sorensen, Preben Meulengracht, eds. (1996), The Waking of Angantyr: The Scandinavian Past in European Culture, ISBN 87-7288-435-5
