= Svafrlami =

Hero in Norse mythology

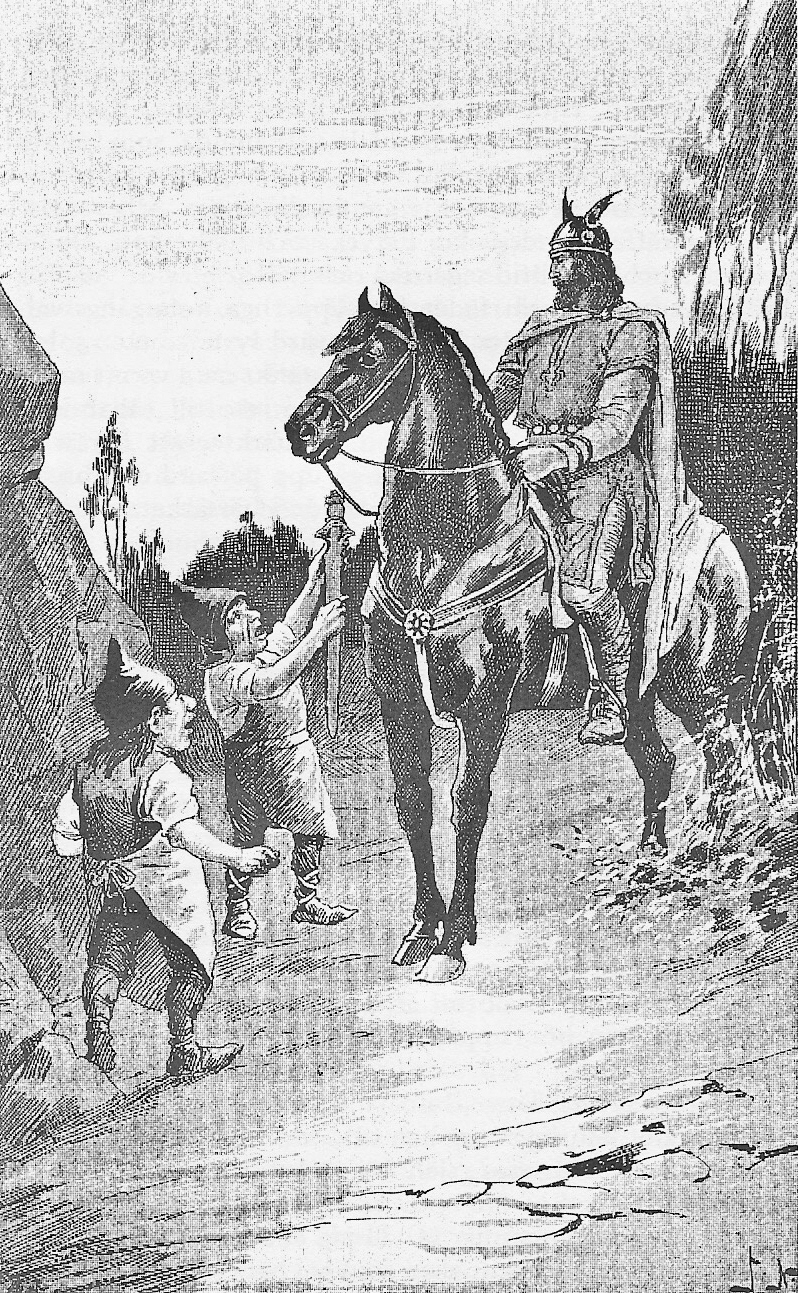
Svafrlami and the Dwarves, by Jenny Nyström (1895).

Svafrlami (Old Norse: [ˈswɑvz̠ˌlɑme]) was in the H and U version of the Hervarar saga the son of Sigrlami, who was the son of Odin. In the R version, Svafrlami is called Sigrlami [ˈsiɣz̠ˌlɑme] and his parentage is not given. Svafrlami was the king of Gardariki and the first owner of the magic sword Tyrfing.

One day, he was hunting on his horse and discovered two dwarves near a large stone. He bound them by swinging his sword above them so they could not disappear. The dwarves, who were named Dvalinn and Durin, asked if they could buy themselves free and undertook to make a magic sword. The sword would neither break nor rust and it would cut through iron and stone as easily as through cloth and would always give victory.

When Svafrlami acquired the sword, he saw that it was an exquisite and beautiful weapon and it was named Tyrfing. However, before disappearing into the rock, the dwarves cursed the weapon so that it would never be unsheathed without killing a man, would be the undoing of Svafrlami and cause three evil deeds.

One day, Svafrlami met the Berserker Arngrim. According to the H and U versions, they started to fight. Tyrfing cut through Arngrim's shield and down into the soil, whereupon Arngrim cut off Svafrlami's hand, took Tyrfing and slew him. Arngrim then forced Svafrlami's daughter Eyfura to marry him.

According to the R version, Arngrim became the war-chief of the aged king and was given both Tyrfing and Eyfura as rewards.

For the continued legend of the sword Tyrfing, see Arngrim.
