= Tirfing (opera) =

1898 Swedish-language opera by Wilheim Stenhammar

Tirfing is an 1898 Swedish-language opera by Wilhelm Stenhammar. The title refers to the magic sword Tyrfing in Norse mythology.

== Recordings ==
- Tirfing (excerpts) Ingrid Tobiasson, Jesper Taube, Carina Morling; Royal Opera Orchestra, Stockholm, Leif Segerstam Sterling 1 CD
