= Sturlaugs saga starfsama =

Legendary saga from the 14th century

Sturlaugs saga starfsama is a legendary saga from the 14th century about Sturlaugr the Industrious, who was the son of a Norwegian Hersir.

After having killed a competing suitor and chased away a second one, he married Åsa the Fair, the daughter of a jarl. Her old foster-mother helps Sturlaugr with advice and predictions. The hero has to undertake a dangerous journey to find the horn of an aurochs and enquire about its origins, which is even more dangerous.

Eventually, Sturlaugr becomes a high chieftain in the Swedish army. His son is Göngu-Hrólfr, the hero of Göngu-Hrólfs saga.

The saga was thought by Knut Liestøl to have been a major influence on Ormars rímur (via, Liestøl supposed, a now lost prose Ormars saga).
