= Heidrek =

Figure in Norse mythology

Heidrek or Heiðrekr (Old Norse: [ˈhɛiðˌrekz̠]) is one of the main characters in the cycle about the magic sword Tyrfing. He appears in the Hervarar saga, and probably also in Widsith, together with his sons Angantyr (Incgentheow) and Hlöð (Hlith), and Hlöð's mother Sifka (Sifeca). The etymology is heiðr, meaning "honour", and rekr, meaning "ruler, king".

== Youth ==
Heidrek was the son of king Höfund and his wife Hervor, a shieldmaiden. Like his mother in her youth, he was ill-natured and violent. To amend this, he was raised by the wise Geatish king Gizur, but this did not improve his disposition. One day, when his parents were having a banquet, Heidrek arrived uninvited and late at night, he started a quarrel which ended in manslaughter. His father, King Höfund, banished Heidrek from his kingdom, although Hervor did her utmost to soften Höfund's feelings against his son.

== His father's advice ==
However, before Heidrek left, his father gave him some words of advice:

"Never help a man who has betrayed his master.
Never give peace to a man who has murdered his friend.
Don't allow your wife to visit her family frequently, even though she insists on doing so.
Never tell your loved one about your secret thoughts.
If you're in a hurry, never ride your best horse.
Never punish the son of a better man.
Never break a promise about peace.
Never have many thralls in your company."

Heidrek immediately decided never to follow his father's advice.

== Departing ==
Hervor secretly gave her son the sword Tyrfing as she bade him farewell, and his brother Angantyr kept him company for a while. When they had walked for some time, Heidrek wanted to have a look at the sword. Since he had unsheathed it, the curse the dwarves had put on the sword made him kill his brother.

== Adventures ==
After a while, Heidrek met a patrol moving a prisoner who was to be executed because he had murdered his master. He remembered his father's advice and resolved to buy the criminal. Then he continued his journey and met a patrol moving a scoundrel who had killed his comrade. Likewise, Heidrek bought the man's life in order to disobey his father.

Soon, Heidrek arrived in Reidgotaland, entered the Gothic king Harald's service, and disposed of two rebellious jarls for him. This earned him half the Gothic kingdom and the king's daughter, Helga. Heidrek and Helga had a son who was named Angantyr after Heidrek's brother and grandfather. During the same time old King Harald had a son who was named Halfdan.

Unfortunately, Reidgotaland was struck with bad crops and starvation. The goðar (heathen priests) determined that they must sacrifice the most noble young man of the kingdom to Odin in order to restore good crops. Immediately, people started to quarrel about which of the princes was the most noble, and so they asked king Höfund of Glæsisvellir. King Höfund decided that it was Angantyr (Harald's own grandson) who was the most noble prince. Höfund also told Heidrek to ask King Harald that in recompense for sacrificing his own son, he should receive half the Gothic army as his own. King Harald agreed to this.

However, when Höfund called for a thing in order to sacrifice Angantyr, Heidrek objected and said that Odin would be happy if instead of Angantyr, he received King Harald and his son Halfdan. Then, Heidrek made a coup d'état with his half of the Gothic army, using Tyrfing to kill King Harald and his son. When his wife Helga heard the news, she committed suicide by hanging herself.

== King of the Goths ==
Heidrek used his army to subjugate the Gothic kingdom and ruled with brutal force. He defeated Humli, the king of the Huns, and captured his daughter Sifka, whom he raped. When she became pregnant, she was sent back to her father's kingdom, where she bore a son who was named Hlöd.

Heidrek married Olof, the daughter of Åke, the King of the Saxons. She often asked to go home to visit her family, and since Heidrek remembered his father's advice, he always gladly consented. This would turn out to be an unwise strategy, because one day he made the journey to Saxony in order to see his wife among her family. He found her in the arms of a blond thrall and immediately divorced her.

Instead, he married a girl from Finland who was named Sifka, like the Hunnic princess. One day, they were visiting king Rollaug of Gardariki. To oppose a fourth word of advice given by his father, he told Sifka a secret and asked her to swear an oath never to tell anyone. The secret was that he had accidentally killed King Rollaug's son in a hunting accident.

Naturally, Sifka immediately ran to King Rollaug and told him the secret, which caused King Rollaug to capture Heidrek and to kill all of his retinue. The two men who bound him were none other than the two culprits he had saved from the gallows.

When king Rollaug was about to burn Heidrek alive, someone broke the news that the prince was still alive and that Heidrek was innocent. Rollaug apologized and in recompense for Heidrek's losses he gave him his own daughter, Hergerd.

Heidrek and Hergerd had a daughter who was named Hervor, the shieldmaiden, after his mother who had just died. This was the beginning of a time of peace for Heidrek.

During a voyage, Heidrek camped at the Carpathians (Harvaða fjöllum, cf. Grimm's law). He was accompanied by eight mounted thralls, and while Heidrek slept, the thralls broke into his tent, took Tyrfing and slew Heidrek.

This was the last one of Tyrfing's three evil deeds. Heidrek's son Angantyr caught the thralls, killed them and reclaimed the magic sword, but the curse had ceased.

== Sources ==
Henrikson, Alf (1998). Stora mytologiska uppslagsboken.

Tolkien, Christopher (1960) The Saga of King Heidrek the Wise: Translated from the Icelandic with Introduction, Notes and Appendices. Thomas Nelson and Sons Ltd. ASIN: B000V9BAO0. An on-line PDF copy is available from the Viking Society for Northern Research.
