= Myrkviðr =

Name of several European forests

In Germanic mythology, Myrkviðr (Old Norse "dark wood" or "black forest") is the name of several European forests.

The direct derivatives of the name occur as a place name both in Sweden and Norway. Related forms of the name occur elsewhere in Europe, such as in the Black Forest (Schwarzwald), and may thus be a general term for dark and dense forests of ancient Europe.

The name was anglicised by Sir Walter Scott (in Waverley) and William Morris (in The House of the Wolfings) and later popularized by J. R. R. Tolkien as "Mirkwood".

== Etymology ==
The word myrkviðr is a compound of two words. The first element is myrkr "dark", which is cognate to, among others, the English adjectives mirky and murky. The second element is viðr "wood, forest".

== Attestations ==
The name is attested as a mythical local name of a forest in the Poetic Edda poem Lokasenna, and the heroic poems Atlakviða, Helgakviða Hundingsbana I and Hlöðskviða, and in prose in Fornmanna sögur, Flateyjarbók, Hervarar Saga, Ála flekks saga.

The localization of Myrkviðr varies by source:

1. The Ore Mountains in the writings of Thietmar of Merseburg.
2. The forests north of the Ukrainian steppe during the time of the Goths and the Huns in the Norse Hervarar saga
3. The forest that separates the Huns from the Burgundians
4. Kolmården ("the dark forest"), in Sweden, in Sögubrot and in legends such as that of Helge Hundingsbane
5. The forest south of Uppsala in Styrbjarnar þáttr Svíakappa (the present remnant of this forest is called Lunsen)
6. Uncertain locations, such as in the Völundarkviða, where it is probably located elsewhere in Scandinavia (Weyland is here described as a Finnish prince, which would make him a Saami prince). Stanza 1 (on the swan maidens):

Meyjar flugu sunnan
myrkvið í gögnum,
Alvitr unga,
örlög drýgja;
þær á sævarströnd
settusk at hvílask
drósir suðrænar,
dýrt lín spunnu.

Translation:

Maids from the south
through Myrkwood flew,
Fair and young,
their fate to follow;
On the shore of the sea
to rest them they sat,
The maids of the south,
and flax they spun.

6. Mythological. In other sources, such as the Poetic Edda, e.g. Lokasenna, the location seems to be between Asgard and Muspelheim, as Muspell's sons ride through it at Ragnarök. Stanza 42:

Loci qvaþ:
«Gvlli keypta
leztv Gymis dottvr
oc seldir þitt sva sverþ;
enn er Mvspellz synir
ríða Myrcviþ yfir,
veizta þv þa, vesall! hve þv vegr.»

Translation:

Loki spake:
"The daughter of Gymir
with gold didst thou buy,
And sold thy sword to boot;
But when Muspell's sons
through Myrkwood ride,
Thou shalt weaponless wait, poor wretch."

== Theories ==
J. R. R. Tolkien comments on Myrkviðr in a letter to his eldest grandson:

Mirkwood is not an invention of mine, but a very ancient name, weighted with legendary associations. It was probably the Primitive Germanic name for the great mountainous forest regions that anciently formed a barrier to the south of the lands of Germanic expansion. In some traditions it became used especially of the boundary between Goths and Huns. I speak now from memory: its ancientness seems indicated by its appearance in very early German (11th c.?) as mirkiwidu although the *merkw- stem 'dark' is not otherwise found in German at all (only in O[ld] E[nglish], O[ld] S[axon], and O[ld] N[orse]), and the stem *widu- > witu was in German (I think) limited to the sense of 'timber,' not very common, and did not survive into mod[ern] G[erman]. In O[ld] E[nglish] mirce only survives in poetry, and in the sense 'dark', or rather 'gloomy', only in Beowulf [line] 1405 ofer myrcan mor: elsewhere only with the sense 'murky' > wicked, hellish. It was never, I think, a mere 'colour' word: 'black', and was from the beginning weighted with the sense of 'gloom'...

Regarding the forests, Francis Gentry comments that "in the Norse tradition 'crossing the Black Forest' came to signify penetrating the barriers between one world and another, especially the world of the gods and the world of fire, where Surt lives [...]."

== Modern influence ==
Myrkviðr was first anglicized as Mirkwood by Sir Walter Scott in Waverley, followed by William Morris in A Tale of the House of the Wolfings from 1888, and later by J. R. R. Tolkien in his fiction.

== See also ==
- Járnviðr
- Hercynian Forest, an ancient forest of southern Germany
- Miriquidi
