= Reidgotaland =

Mythical location

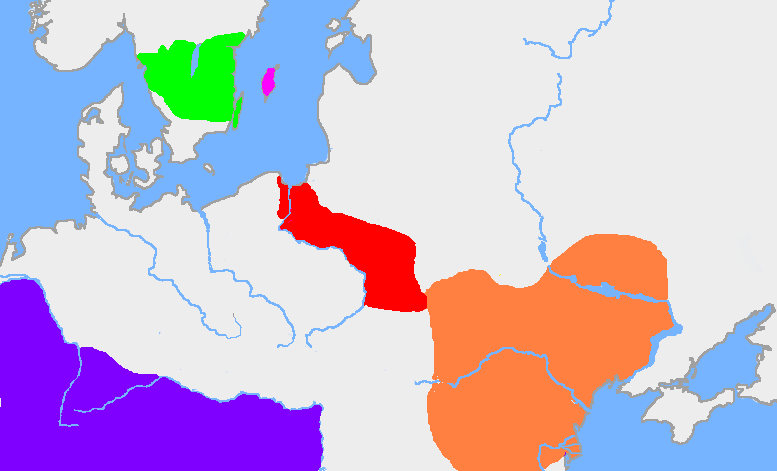
The oldest regions labelled Reidgotaland (in red and orange). The purple area is the Roman Empire and the pink area is Gotland

Reidgotaland, Reidgothland, Reidgotland, Hreidgotaland or Hreiðgotaland was a land mentioned in Germanic heroic legend (mentioned in the Scandinavian sagas as well as the Anglo-Saxon Widsith) usually interpreted as the land of the Goths.

== Etymology and Location ==
Oddly, hreiðr can mean "bird's nest" and perhaps it was a kenning for the Goths tradition of moving and "nesting" in new territories, but hreið- is also a name-prefix meaning "beautiful", "eager", "great", "famous", "noble". Another possibility is that it was originally reið "ride, journey" (see Raidô). The use of the prefix is simple as the same tribal name was used for the Gutes of Gotland. The identification of the territory varies between the sources. This is the list of meanings given by Nordisk familjebok:

1. The Island of Gotland.
2. Götaland.
3. The land of the Goths, i.e. Gothiscandza and their later territories. In Hervarar saga, it was the same as Oium and bordered the land of the Huns from which it was separated by Myrkviðr.
4. The territories of the Goths in southern Europe, according to Anglo-Saxon sources.
5. Denmark and Sweden (according to Snorri's Edda it was the earthly kingdom of Odin).
6. Denmark.
7. Jutland.

The second edition of Nordisk familjebok explains that Hreidgoths was originally applied to the Ostrogoths in south-eastern Europe. It appears as hraiþkutum hręiðgotum on the Rök Stone in Östergötland. In Hervarar saga, the name Hreiðgotaland is applied to the territories of the Ostrogoths in south-eastern Europe. In Widsith, the traveller has been with the Hreðgotum, ruled by Eormanrīc, historic king of the Goths. In Snorri's Edda, it is either applied to Jutland or to Scandinavia as a whole, while the islands are called Eygotaland. In the Legendary sagas however, Eygotaland is used only for the island of Gotland in the Baltic Sea.

== See also ==
- Ermanaric
- Oium
- Chernyakhov culture
- Goths
