= Tyrfing =

Legendary sword from Norse mythology

Tyrfing as the coat of arms of Bolmsö parish

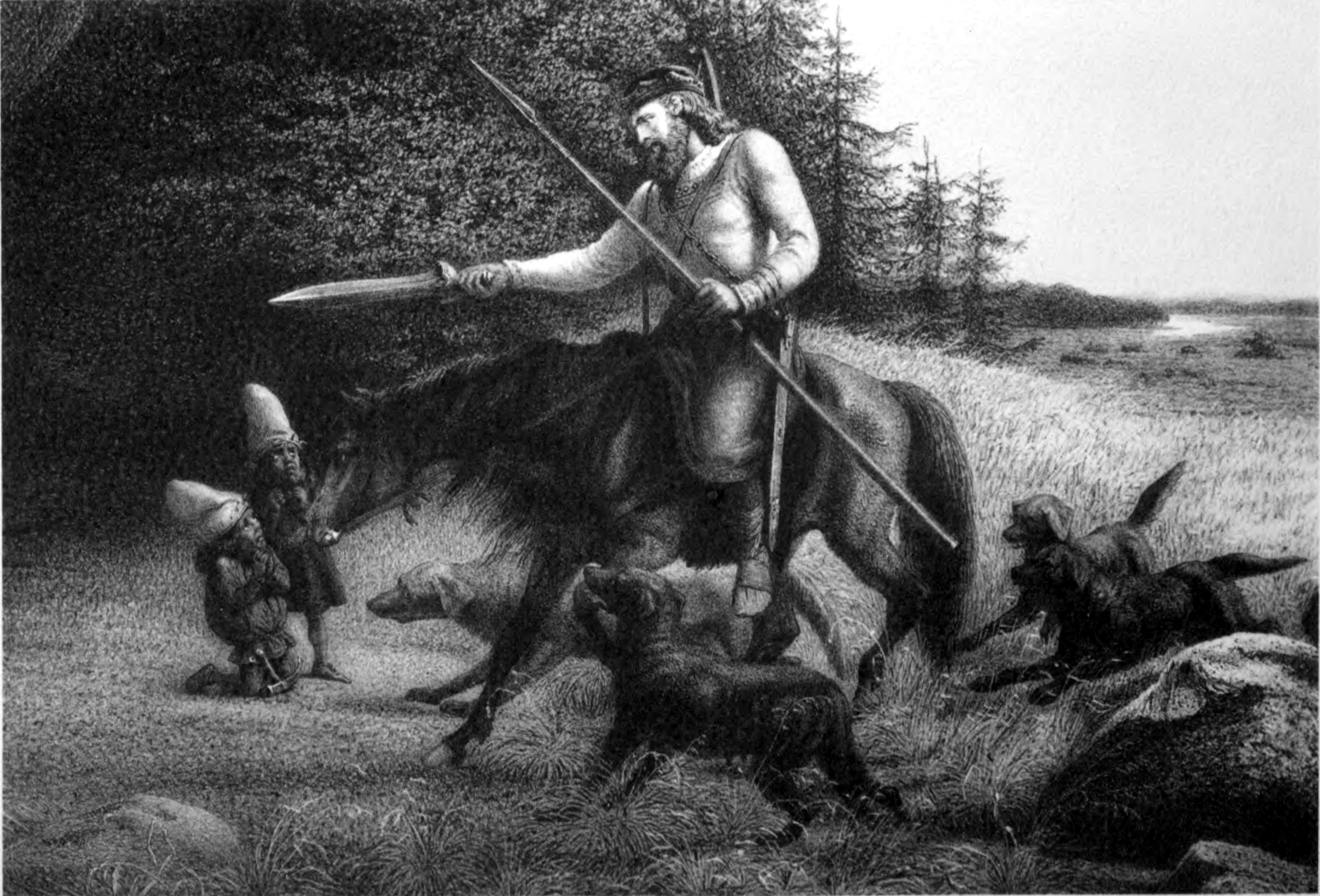
Svafrlami secures the sword Tyrfing.

Tyrfing, also rendered as Tirfing or Tyrving, was a magic sword in Norse mythology, which features in the Tyrfing Cycle, which includes a poem from the Poetic Edda called Hervararkviða, and the Hervarar saga. The name is also used in the saga to denote the Goths.

== Description ==
As described in its legends, Tyrfing was

the keenest of all blades; every time it was drawn a light shone from it like a ray of the sun. It could never be held unsheathed without being the death of a man, and it had always to be sheathed with blood still warm upon it. There was no living thing, neither man nor beast, that could live to see another day if it were wounded by Tyrfing, whether the wound were big or little; never had it failed in a stroke or been stayed before it plunged into the earth, and the man who bore it in battle would always be victorious, if blows were struck with it.

Certain stories seem to imply that Tyrfing is capable of deicide, as shown when King Heidrek recognizes the god Odin in a disguise and strikes at him, forcing Odin to transform into a hawk to escape the blow. Recent scholarship informed by New Materialism approaches has interpreted Tyrfing as possessing narrative agency, particularly in how the sword shapes the saga’s plot and complicates the actions of its wielders.

== The Tyrfing Cycle ==
Svafrlami was the king of Gardariki, and Odin's grandson. He managed to trap the dwarfs Dvalinn and Durinn when they had left the rock where they dwelt. Then he forced them to forge a sword with a golden hilt that would never miss a stroke, would never rust and would cut through stone and iron as easily as through clothes.

The dwarfs made the sword, and it shone and gleamed like fire. However, in revenge they cursed it so that it would kill a man every time it was drawn and that it would be the cause of three great evils. They finally cursed it so that it would also kill Svafrlami himself.

When Svafrlami heard the curses he tried to slay Dvalinn, but the dwarf disappeared into the rock and though the sword was driven deep into it, it missed its intended victim.

Svafrlami wielded the sword and achieved many victories with it, until he faced the berserker Arngrim. When he struck at Arngrim, he cut through his opponent's shield, burying the sword in the ground. Arngrim then cut off the king's hand, took the sword and killed Svafrlami with it, accomplishing the dwarfs' curse.

Arngrim took Svafrlami's daughter as his wife and had a son Angantyr and eleven other brothers. He passed the sword to Angantyr. Later, Angantyr wished to marry Ingeborg, daughter of Yngvi. However, Yngvi said Ingeborg should choose who she would marry, and she chose the Swedish champion Hjalmar. In a rage, Angantyr challenged him to a duel. Angantyr and his brothers were thus all slain at Samsø by Hjalmar and his Norwegian sworn brother Orvar-Odd; but Hjalmar, being wounded by Tyrfing, has only time to sing his death-song before he dies, and asks Orvar-Odd to bring his body to his beloved back at Uppsala. Ingeborg fell down dead at the sight, and so Tyrfing completed its first evil deed.

Angantyr had married another woman (Tófa) between issuing his challenge and his death, and through her had a daughter Hervor. Hervor was brought up as a bond-servant, and inherited her father's prowess in combat. Upon learning of her parentage, she armed herself as a shieldmaiden, and travelled to Munarvoe in Samsø in an attempt to recover her father's weapon. There she visited her father's burial mound and spoke with the ghost of the dead man, who warned her Tyrfing would bring ill-fortune to her descendants. She then counters her father by threatening him with the "curse of annihilation" if he keeps the sword, saying that he and his brothers "shall waste away as in an anthill," and that it was "not fitting that the dead should hold such a precious weapon." At this, Angantyr relents and gives Hervor his sword willingly, wishing luck and valor upon her. Hervor used the sword in various adventures, and eventually would marry King Gudmund's son, Höfund. Together they had two sons, Heidrek and Angantyr (the second). Hervor gave Heidrek the sword Tyrfing in secret. While Angantyr and Heidrek walked, Heidrek showed Angantyr the sword. Since he had unsheathed it, the curse the dwarfs had put on the sword made Heidrek kill his brother Angantyr. This was the second of Tyrfing's three evil deeds.

Heidrek became king of the Goths by slaying the previous king Harold. During a voyage, Heidrek camped at the Carpathians (Harvaða fjöllum, cf. Grimm's law). There, he defeated a disguised Odin in a game of riddles. Heidrek was accompanied by a number of thralls, and due to Odin's anger that night they entered his tent and slew him in his sleep, the third and final of Tyrfing's evil deeds. Heidrek's son, also named Angantyr (the third), caught and killed the thralls and reclaimed the magic sword, finally satisfying the dwarfs' curse.

Angantyr was the next king of the Goths, but his illegitimate half-Hun brother Hlod (or Hlöd, Hlöðr) wanted half of the kingdom. Angantýr refused, and Gizur called Hlod a bastard and his mother a slave-girl. Hlod and 343,200 mounted Huns invaded the Goths (See The Battle of the Goths and Huns), killing Angantyr's sister. Angantyr raised an army to face Hlod, but the Huns greatly outnumbered the Goths. The Goths won because Angantyr used Tyrfing to slay Hlod on the battlefield. The bodies of the numerous warriors choked the rivers, causing a flood which filled the valleys with dead men and horses.

== Versions and ambiguities ==
There are three known medieval written versions of the so-called "Hervarvar Saga", the R, U and H versions. The versions themselves are composite of other known and unknown stories from a range of time periods. The above is based on the later H version of the tale, seen in the translation by Nora Kershaw Chadwick and a modern version by Martyn Whittock. For links to source text in English translation and Old Norse and for general commentary see Hervarar saga ok Heiðreks.

The versions differ in terms of names, and various details but most especially Tyrfing's curse, which is only lightly alluded to in the oldest version. The identity of the "three evil deeds" is also ambiguous. Christopher Tolkien argues that the evil deeds ought to refer to kinslaying - Heidrek killing his brother Angantyr, Heidrek killing his father in law King Harold, and Angantyr slaying his half brother Hlod. However, this is complicated by the fact that in the oldest R version, Tyrfing was not clearly used to kill Hlod, and was definitely not used to kill Angantyr. Indeed, Heidrek only slew Harold to save his son. Further, in this oldest version Tyrfing did not accomplish the death of Svafrlami. Thus, Tolkien argues that the curse is a later elaboration, noting though the conflict with the "Awakening of Angantyr" in which the sword is clearly described as cursed.

The curse on Tyrfing is comparable to that placed on the ring Andvaranaut in the Völsung Cycle.

== Etymology ==
Scholars have not come to a definitive conclusion as to the origins of the name Tyrfing, but there are several theories. One maintains that it is possibly connected to the Thervingi (or Tervingi), a Gothic tribe recorded by Roman sources in the 4th century. Another reads the name as a combination of Tyr, Norse god of war, and fingr, an Old Norse spelling of the word finger, to literally mean "the finger of the war god." A third theory instead poses the suffix -ing as denoting a sense of ownership, in the vein of other Scandinavian sword names such as Hoeking ("sword owned by Hoekr") or Hunlafing ("sword owned by Hunlaf"), which would thus render the name "sword of Torfi," though who "Torfi" is in this context is not clear.

== Influence on modern fantasy ==
The theme of a cursed sword which causes evil deeds whenever drawn was taken up by several modern writers of Fantasy – notably Michael Moorcock's Stormbringer, the magic sword wielded by the doomed albino emperor Elric of Melniboné. Science fiction author Poul Anderson included Tyrfing in his medieval fantasy novel The Broken Sword. In a more lighthearted tone, the theme was also taken up by Lawrence Watt-Evans in The Misenchanted Sword. The sword also appears in the novel The Quickleys and the Keeper of Balance by M. J. Packham.

== In popular culture ==
Tyrfing has been referenced in a variety of modern contexts that reference Norse mythology. Tyrfing has been used as the name of a hot sauce on Hot Ones, the name of a "demon sword" in High School DxD, a holy weapon in Fire Emblem: Genealogy of the Holy War, and a cursed sword in Castlevania: Symphony of the Night.

== See also ==
- Fornsigtuna
- Kukri - Similar to Tyrfing, the Kukri is a blade that according to mythology, cannot be sheathed without spilling blood.
