= Hervor =

Viking and shield maiden characters

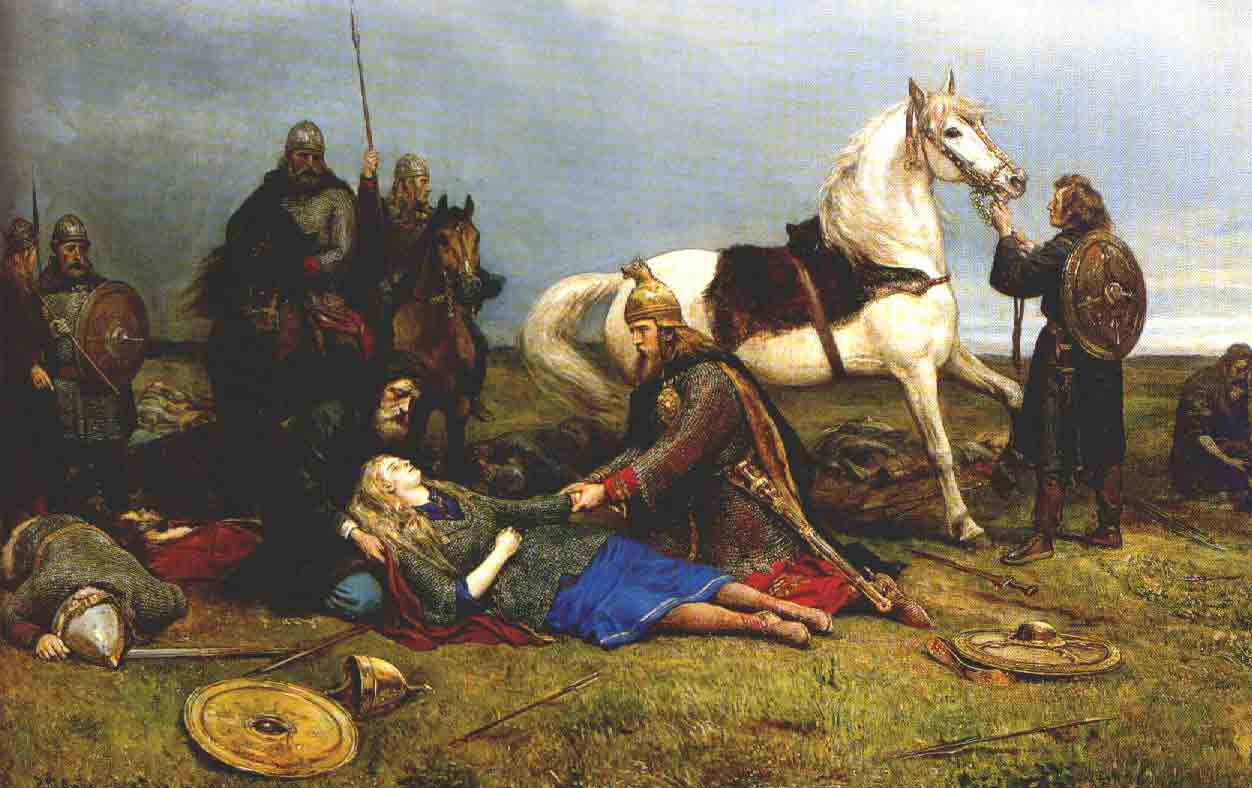
Hervor, daughter of Heidrek, dying at the Battle of the Goths and Huns, a painting by Peter Nicolai Arbo.

Hervör (Old Norse: Hervǫr) is the name shared by two female characters in the Tyrfing Cycle, presented in The Saga of Hervör and Heidrek with parts found in the Poetic Edda. The first, the Viking Hervör, challenged her father Angantýr's ghost in his gravemound for his cursed sword Tyrfing. She had a son, Heidrek, father of the other Hervör. The second Hervör was a commander killed in battle with her brother.

The two are thought by some academics to be the same character, duplicated.

== Hervör, daughter of Angantyr ==
=== Childhood ===
Hervör was born after her father Angantyr died during a duel against the Swedish hero Hjalmar. Her mother was Svafa, who was daughter of a Jarl Bjarmar. Rather than take on sewing or be raised as a bond-maid like other girls, Hervör proved to be as strong as the boys and learned archery, swordsmanship, and horse riding.

She dressed like a man, fought, killed and pillaged under her male surname Hjörvard. When she learned of her father's identity, she decided to live as her father and to find Tyrfing, the magic sword.

=== Summoning the dead ===
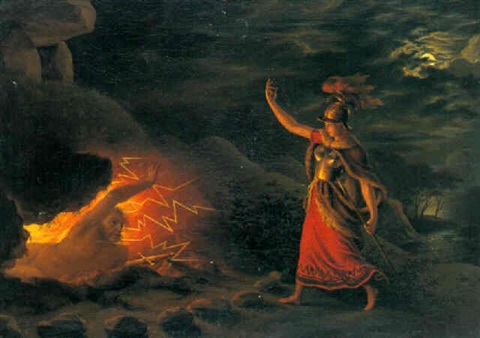
Hervör wakes her father Angantýr's ghost from his barrow to demand the cursed sword Tyrfing. Oil painting by Christian Gottlieb Kratzenstein-Stub (1783–1816)

One day, Hervör arrived with her fleet to Munarvágr on Samsø (Samsey), but she was the only one who dared go ashore upon the haunted island. The remainder of her crew feared the nightly activities around the barrows on the island. As she approached the barrows, she saw a fire shining above them, and she approached the largest one. She then spoke with a loud voice summoning her father Angantyr to reveal himself. She said that as his daughter she was entitled to her rightful inheritance, the cursed sword Tyrfing. She went on to summon her eleven uncles and did so with such a loud voice and such harsh words that finally, her father's voice was heard and he asked not to pursue her quest. She did not give in but continued to ask for her rightful inheritance.

Finally, the grave opened, and in its centre, a fire was shining. There she saw her father, and he warned her not to ask for the sword as it would bring death to their whole clan if she used it. Still, she persisted. Finally the sword was cast out of the grave, and she eagerly gripped it, bid farewell to her dead kinsmen and walked to the shore.

However, when she arrived at the shore, the ships were gone. Her crew had been scared away by the fires and the thunder from the barrows.

=== After retrieving Tyrfing ===
Eventually, she managed to leave the island and arrived at the court of Gudmund of Glæsisvellir. She still dressed herself as a man and called herself Hervarðr. Cunningly, she helped the king to win playing tafl. However, she also slew a courtier who tried to unsheathe Tyrfing after she had left it on a chair. Then, she resumed her Viking activities, and travelled far and wide.

=== Settling down ===
After a while she grew tired of the adventures and returned to her foster-father Bjartmar. At Bjartmar's residence, she began sewing and embroidering like other girls, and was considered to be a beautiful and good-mannered girl.

King Gudmund's son Höfund, then arrived to ask for her hand, and she agreed. The old king Gudmund arranged a grand wedding, and entrusted the kingdom in the hands of the young couple. They lived happily and had two sons who were given the names Angantyr and Heidrek.

The sword Tyrfing would continue its ill work, and Heidrek slew his brother Angantyr with the sword. For the continued adventures of Tyrfing, see Heidrek.

== Hervör, daughter of Heidrek ==
Heidrek had a daughter who he named Hervör. She was a shieldmaiden and was the commander of a Gothic fort facing Myrkviðr, and she would fall in battle against the Huns (see Hlöd, Hlöðskviða). When her foster-father Ormar reported Hervör's death to king Angantyr, he said:

Sunnan em ek kominn at segja spjöll þessi: sviðin er öll mörk ok Myrkviðar heiðr, drifin öll Goðþjóð gumna blóði. Mey veit ek Heiðreks, systur þína, svigna til jarðar; hafa Húnar hana fellda ok marga aðra yðra þegna, léttari gerðist hún at böð en við biðil ræða eða í bekk at fara at brúðar gangi.	"From the south I've come to say this news: burnt is Mirkwood Heath and the whole forest, Goth-folk all blotched with blood of men. Down, I hear, is Heidrek's lass; heard your sister, the Huns felled her — and of your people plenty more. More cheery in battle than chatting to suitors or taking the bench at a bridal feast."

When King Angantyr heard this, he grinned and was slow to speak, but at last he said:

Óbróðurliga vartu leikin, in ágæta systir.
"Unbrotherly the bloody game they played with you, excellent sister."

== See also ==
- Tofa (Poetic Edda)

== Sources ==
- Herikson, Alf. (1998), Stora mytologiska uppslagsboken.

- N. Kershaw's English translation of the Hervarar saga (from the H-text) with facing Old Norse text
