= Angantyr =

Character in Norse mythology

Angantyr (also spelled Angantýr) was the name of three male characters from the same line in Norse mythology, and who appear in Hervarar saga, Gesta Danorum, and Faroese ballads.

The last generation named Angantyr also appears to be mentioned as Incgentheow in Widsith, line 115, together with his father Heiðrekr (Heathoric), half-brother Hlöð (Hlith) and Hlöð's mother Sifka (Sifeca).

== Angantyr the Berserker ==
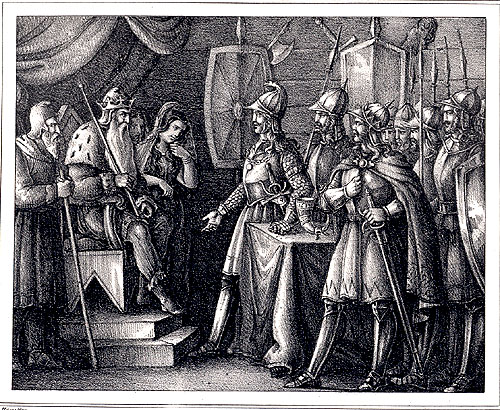
Hjorvard and Hjalmar propose to Ingeborg

Angantyr's father Arngrim had given him the magic sword Tyrfing, which cut through anything as if through cloth, and which killed a man every time it was unsheathed. He was the tallest of the twelve sons of the berserker Arngrim, and he and his eleven brothers spread fear and destruction through the North.

One Yule, they were back home on Bolmsö when the next eldest son Hjörvard, swore that he would win Ingeborg, the daughter of Yngve, the king of Sweden.

The twelve brothers departed for Uppsala and Hjorvard proposed to Ingeborg. However then Hjalmar, one of the Swedish king's champions, stepped forth and claimed he deserved the princess rather than a berserker.

The Swedish king, who feared opposing twelve uncontrollable and infamous berserkers in his hall, suggested that Ingeborg herself should decide. Naturally, she chose Hjalmar, and Hjorvard was besides himself with rage. He challenged Hjalmar to a duel on Samsø and declared that Hjalmar would lose his honour if he did not turn up.

When the twelve brothers arrived on Samsø, they started to go berserk. They bit their shields, screamed loud and coarsely and let themselves loose on Hjalmar and Orvar-Odd's crewmen and began to cut them to pieces.

Hjalmar and Orvar-Odd arrived to the scene to find their crew slain and Orvar-Odd, with only his club, slew Angantyr's eleven brothers. After the melee, he found Angantyr dead and Hjalmar mortally wounded by the cursed sword, Tyrfing.

Orvar-Odd buried the twelve brothers in barrows on Samsø together with the cursed sword, so that it would no longer cause any harm. However Angantyr's daughter Hervor would later return and claim Tyrfing as her own. This event is known as "the waking of Angantyr", as recorded in the poem The Waking of Angantyr.

== Angantyr Höfundsson ==
Angantyr's daughter Hervor married Höfund of Glæsisvellir and they had the sons Heidrek and Angantyr. Angantyr would be the next of Tyrfing's victims. Angantyr's brother Heidrek had made himself impossible at home and was banished by his father. Angantyr wanted to follow his brother for a while on the road to say farewell, but then he asked to see the sword Tyrfing which Heidrek had got from their mother Hervor. Heidrek kindly showed his brother the weapon, but since Tyrfing could not be unsheathed without slaying a man, Angantyr became its next victim.

== Angantyr Heidreksson ==
Heidrek would have the daughter Hervor and the sons Angantyr and Hlöd. When Heidrek, the king of the Goths died, Angantyr inherited and refused to give Hlöd equal share. Hlöd attacked with the Hunnish army and in an epic battle, Hlöd was slain. Angantyr would be one of the ancestors of the Swedish kings of the House of Munsö.

== See also ==
- Tofa (Poetic Edda)
