= Germanic heroic legend =

Heroic literary traditions of the Germanic-speaking peoples

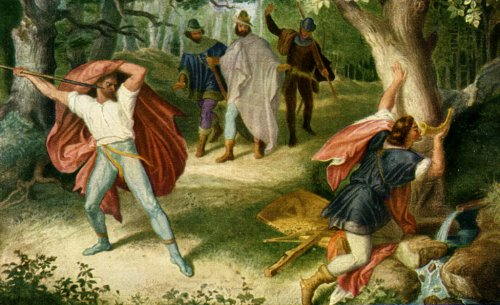
Hagen kills Siegfried while the Burgundian kings Gunther, Giselher, and Gernot watch. Julius Schnorr von Carolsfeld, 1847.

Germanic heroic legend (German: germanische Heldensage) is the heroic literary tradition of the Germanic-speaking peoples, most of which originates or is set in the Migration Period (4th-6th centuries AD). Stories from this time period, to which others were added later, were transmitted orally, traveled widely among the Germanic speaking peoples, and were known in many variants. These legends typically reworked historical events or personages in the manner of oral poetry, forming a heroic age. Heroes in these legends often display a heroic ethos emphasizing honor, glory, and loyalty above other concerns. Like Germanic mythology, heroic legend is a genre of Germanic folklore.

Heroic legends are attested in Anglo-Saxon England, medieval Scandinavia, and medieval Germany. Many take the form of Germanic heroic poetry (German: germanische Heldendichtung): shorter pieces are known as heroic lays, whereas longer pieces are called Germanic heroic epic (germanische Heldenepik). The early Middle Ages preserves only a small number of legends in writing, mostly from England, including the only surviving early medieval heroic epic in the vernacular, Beowulf. Probably the oldest surviving heroic poem is the Old High German Hildebrandslied (c. 800). There also survive numerous pictorial depictions from Viking Age Scandinavia and areas under Norse control in the British Isles. These often attest scenes known from later written versions of legends connected to the hero Sigurd. In the High and Late Middle Ages, heroic texts are written in great numbers in Scandinavia, particularly Iceland, and in southern Germany and Austria. Scandinavian legends are preserved both in the form of Eddic poetry and in prose sagas, particularly in the legendary sagas such as the Völsunga saga. German sources are made up of numerous heroic epics, of which the most famous is the Nibelungenlied (c. 1200).

The majority of the preserved legendary material seems to have originated with the Goths and Burgundians. The most widely and commonly attested legends are those concerning Dietrich von Bern (Theodoric the Great), the adventures and death of the hero Siegfried/Sigurd, and the Huns' destruction of the Burgundian kingdom under king Gundahar. These were "the backbone of Germanic storytelling." The common Germanic poetic tradition was alliterative verse, although this is replaced with poetry in rhyming stanzas in high medieval Germany. In early medieval England and Germany, poems were recited by a figure called the scop, whereas in Scandinavia it is less clear who sang heroic songs. In high medieval Germany, heroic poems seem to have been sung by a class of minstrels.

The heroic tradition died out in England after the Norman Conquest, but was maintained in Germany until the 1600s, and lived on in a different form in Scandinavia until the 20th century as a variety of the medieval ballads. Romanticism resurrected interest in the tradition in the late 18th and early 19th century, with numerous translations and adaptations of heroic texts. The most famous adaptation of Germanic legend is Richard Wagner's operatic cycle Der Ring des Nibelungen, which has in many ways overshadowed the medieval legends themselves in the popular consciousness. Germanic legend was also heavily employed in nationalist propaganda and rhetoric. Finally, it has inspired much of modern fantasy through the works of William Morris and J.R.R. Tolkien, whose The Lord of the Rings incorporates many elements of Germanic heroic legend.

== Heroic tradition ==
=== Definition ===
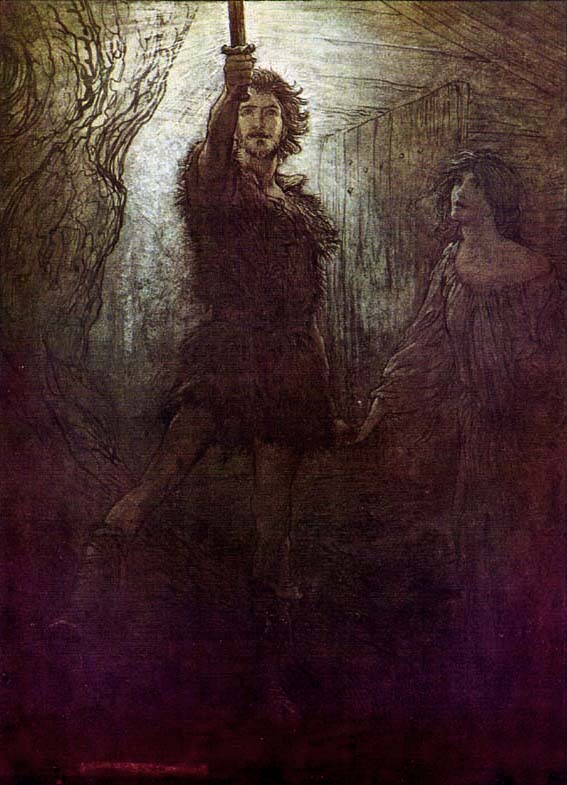
A depiction of Sigmund by Arthur Rackham.

Germanic heroic legend is a somewhat amorphous subject, and drawing clear distinctions between it and similar legendary material can be difficult. Victor Millet refers to three criteria to define Germanic heroic legend: 1) it either originates in the Migration Period or it is (vaguely) set in the Migration Period, which plays the role of a "heroic age;" 2) the legends mythologize the heroic age, so that it no longer is concretely fixed in history, allowing persons who in reality never met to interact; 3) the characters of Germanic legend do not or seldom interact with characters from other legendary cycles, such as the Matter of Britain or the history of the settlement of Iceland. Heroic legends originate and develop as part of an oral tradition, and often involve historical personages.

The heroic legends are traditionally defined according to the geographic location that scholars believe first produced the legend: there is thus continental heroic legend from Germany and the European continent, North Germanic (Scandinavian) heroic legend, and English heroic legend originating in Anglo-Saxon England. The legends are not always attested in their place of origin: thus the Old Norse material about Sigurd originates on the continent and the Old English poem Beowulf portrays a legend that originates in Scandinavia. Material of originally East Germanic Gothic and Burgundian origin is found throughout the entire Germanic-speaking world, making up the majority of the material found in Germany and much of that from England, while originally Scandinavian material is also found in England as well.

The use of the term "Germanic" is disputed in current scholarship, due to its implication of a shared cultural identity for which little evidence exists. Shami Ghosh remarks that Germanic heroic legend is unique in that it is not preserved among the peoples who originated it (mainly Burgundians and Goths) but among other peoples; he cautions that we cannot assume that it functioned to create any sort of "Germanic" identity among its audience, and notes that the Burgundians, for instance, became fairly romanized at an early date. Millet likewise remarks that defining these heroic legends as "Germanic" does not postulate a common Germanic legendary inheritance, but rather that the legends were easily transmitted between peoples speaking related languages. The close link between Germanic heroic legend and Germanic language and possibly poetic devices is shown by the fact that the Germanic speakers in Francia who adopted a Romance language do not preserve Germanic legends, but rather developed their own heroic legends around figures such as William of Gellone, Roland, and Charlemagne. (Note: Ghosh notes that the figure of Walter of Aquitaine forms an exception.)

=== The hero ===
Of central importance to heroic legend is the figure of the hero, about whom conflicting definitions exist. According to Edward Haymes and Susan Samples, the hero is an "extraordinary individual [...] who stands above his contemporaries in physical and moral strength." The hero is typically a man, sometimes a woman, who is admired for his or her achievements in battle and heroic virtues, capable of performing feats impossible for a normal human, and who often dies tragically. Traditionally, scholars has understood these heroic virtues to include personal glory, honor, and loyalty within the lord's retinue. These traits are then understood to form a heroic ethos that Rolf Bremmer traces to descriptions of Germanic warrior culture in the 1st-century AD Roman historian Tacitus. Other scholars have emphasized other qualities: Klaus von See rejected the notion of exemplarity and argued that the hero is defined by his egotism and excessive ("exorbitant"), often brutal behavior, Wolfgang Haubrichs argued that heroes and their ethos primarily display the traditions of ruling families, and Walter Haug argued that the brutality of the heroic ethos derived from the introduction of people to history and their confrontation with seemingly senseless violence. In some cases the hero may also display negative values, but he is nevertheless always extraordinary and excessive in his behavior. For Brian O. Murdoch, the way in which he "copes with the blows of fate" is central. Peter Fisher, expressly distinguishes between the "Germanic hero" and the tragic hero. The death of the former is heroic rather than tragic; it usually brings destruction, not restoration, as in classical tragedy; and the hero's goal is frequently revenge, which would be hamartia (a flaw) in a tragic hero.

In the Germanic sphere, the hero is usually defined by an amazing deed or deeds that show his heroic qualities. The hero is always a warrior, concerned with reputation and fame, as well as his political responsibilities. Heroes belonged to an aristocratic class, and legends about them provided an opportunity for the aristocratic public of the legends to reflect on their own behavior and values. In the High Middle Ages, this means that heroes often also portray the elements of chivalry and courtly behavior expected of their time period.

=== Origins and development ===
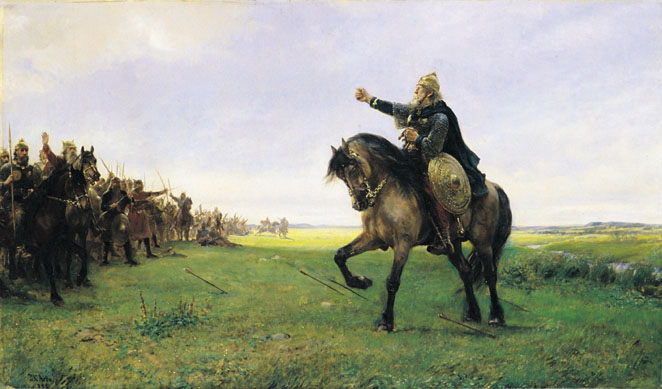
"Neither the Huns nor their hornbows make us afraid!" The Geatish king Gizur challenges the invading Huns to a pitched battle on behalf of the Goths, from the Scandinavian epic poem Battle of the Goths and the Huns, which preserves place names from the Gothic rule in South-Eastern Europe. Painting by Peter Nicolai Arbo, 1886.

The Roman historian Tacitus (c. 56-120) makes two comments that have been taken as attesting early heroic poetry among the Germanic peoples. The first is a remark in Germania:

In the traditional songs which form their only record of the past the Germans celebrate an earth-born god called Tuisto. His son Mannus is supposed to be the fountain-head of their race and himself to have begotten three sons who gave their names to three groups of tribes. (Germania, chapter 2)

The other is a remark in the Annals that the Cheruscian leader Arminius was celebrated in song after his death. This older poetry has not survived, probably because it was heavily connected to Germanic paganism.

Most of the extant heroic legends have their origins in the Migration Period (4th-6th centuries AD); some may have earlier origins, such as the legends of Sigurd and Hildr, while others are likely later, such as the legend of Walter of Aquitaine. Some early Gothic heroic legends are already found in Jordanes' Getica (c. 551). The most important figures around whom heroic legends were composed from the Migration Period are the Gothic king Ermanaric, the Ostrogothic king Theodoric the Great (later known as Dietrich von Bern), the Hunnic king Attila, and the Burgundian king Gundahar. Numerous other sources throughout the Early Middle Ages make brief references to figures known in later heroic legends, as well as to other figures about whom legends have likely been lost.

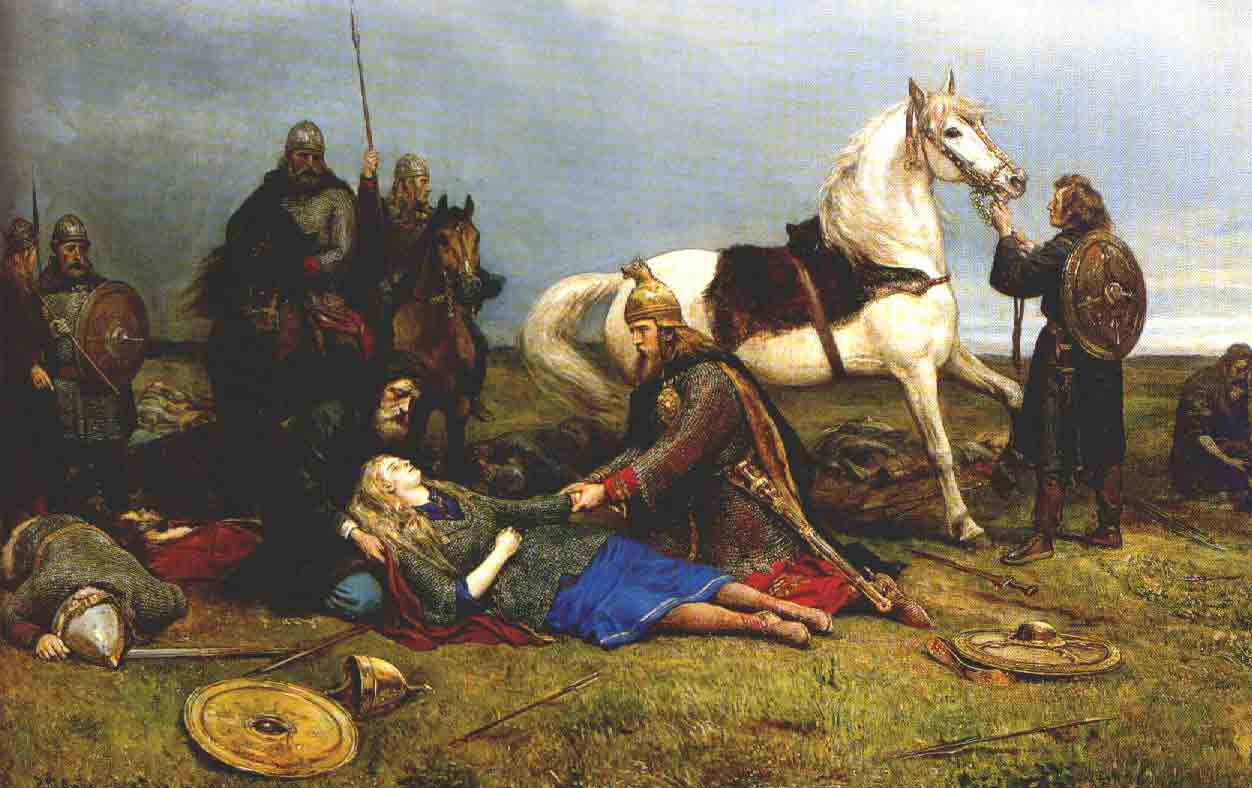
The shieldmaiden Hervor dying after the Battle of the Goths and Huns, by Peter Nicolai Arbo, before 1892.

The original historical material at the heart of the legends has been transformed through the long process of oral transmission: the causes of complex historical and political events are reduced to basic human motivations such as greed, hubris, jealousy, and personal revenge; events are assimilated to folkloric narrative schemes; (Note: Examples of narrative schemes in the heroic legends include the "treacherous invitation" (verräterische Einladung), in which one party invites another to visit them with the intention of betraying them; the "bridal quest scheme" (Brautwerbungsschema), in which heroes set out to acquire a bride; the "unhappy victory" (glückloser Sieg), in which a character achieves a Pyrrhic victory over his enemies; the heroic triumphant downfall (heroisch-triumphaler Untergang), a variant of the unhappy victory told from the perspective of the loser; the challenging scheme (Herausforderungsschema), in which a hero challenges another, more famous hero; and the liberation scheme (Befreiungsschema), in which the hero liberates a figure who has been captured by enemies.) conflicts are personalized, typically as conflicts among relatives; and persons living in different time periods are portrayed as contemporaries living in the same heroic age. Stages in the combination of the originally independent figures of heroic legend can be seen in texts from the 8th and 9th centuries. Additionally, the legends appear to have become increasingly detached from historical reality, though they still may have been understood as conveying historical knowledge. Conflicts with monsters and otherworldly beings also form an important part of heroic legend. As an example of the variability of the tradition, Edward Haymes and Susan Samples note that Sigurd/Siegfried is variously said to be killed in the woods or in his bed, but always with the fixed detail that it was by a spear in the back.

A minority position, championed by Walter Goffart and Roberta Frank, has argued that there is no oral tradition and that heroic legend was in fact developed by learned clerics in the Carolingian period who read about events in the migration period. This position is, however, "contrary to almost all literary scholarship".

=== Relation to myth ===
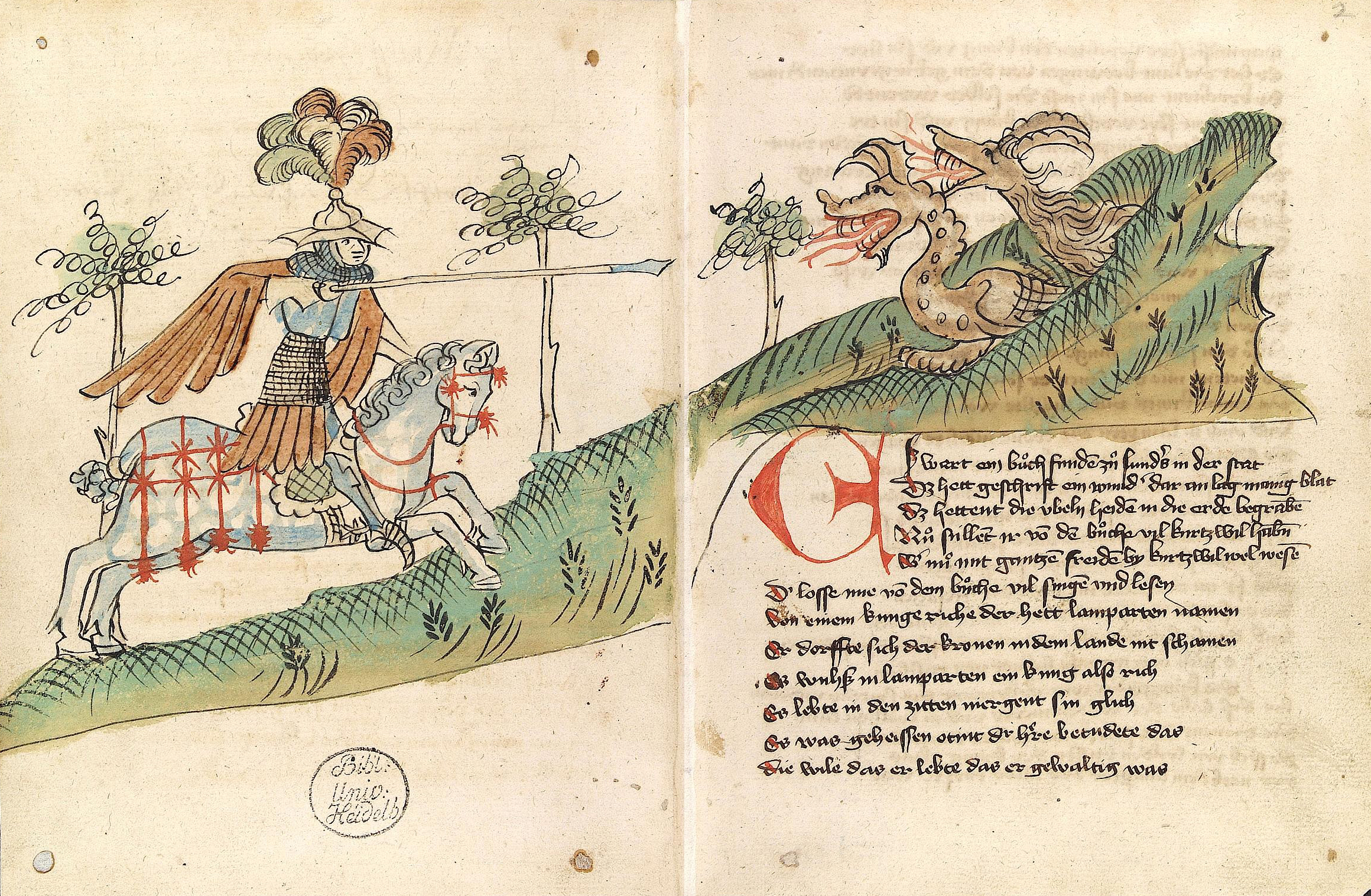
The hero Wolfdietrich fights against dragons. From Heidelberg, Universitätsbiblothek, Cpg 365, folios 1v and 2r.

Heroic legends can also take on mythical elements, and these are common in Germanic heroic legend. Joseph C. Harris writes that "mythic motifs" or "folklore-related motifs" can become attached to the historical core of heroic legend. The liberation of society from monsters and otherworldly beings forms an important part of extant heroic legend. Examples of heroes taking on mythical qualities include the Old Norse hero Starkaðr, who may be portrayed with multiple arms, while Dietrich von Bern is able to breathe fire. The heroine Hildr appears to have become a valkyrie in the Norse tradition, and the same thing may have happened to the heroine Brunhild. Generally, mythical elements are more common in later rather than earlier Norse material: for instance, appearances of Odin are more common in the Völsunga saga than in the heroic poems of the Poetic Edda.

The exact relationship between myth and legend is unclear, and it is also possible for mythological beings to be euhemerized as heroes. Thus some scholars argue that the immense strength Brunhild displays in the Nibelungenlied may indicate that she was originally a mythical being. The historical origins of the figure of Sigurd/Siegfried are uncertain, and his slaying of the dragon represents a victory over chaos and destruction and results in the hero taking on semi-divine abilities. Germanic heroic legend contains fewer mythological elements than that of many other cultures, for instance, the heroic legend of Ancient Greece.

=== Relationship to Christianity ===
Older scholarship was of the opinion that heroic poetry was "entirely heathen", however more recent scholarship has abandoned this position. A great many of the historical figures upon whom heroic legends were based, such as Theodoric the Great, Gundaharius, and Alboin, were Christians. Klaus von See goes so far as to suggest that Christianization and the creation and spread of the heroic legends "went hand in hand." Hermann Reichert, on the other hand, describes heroic poetry as integrating originally pagan poetry into its Christian worldview, as opposed to what he calls "Old Germanic poetry," which was pagan and has not survived. Many of the surviving pictorial representations of heroic legend are in an unambiguously Christian context, and many ecclesiastics belonged to the same aristocratic class among whom heroic poetry was popular. Complaints that ecclesiastical figures preferred hearing heroic tales to the Bible, the church fathers, or saints’ lives are frequent. The creation of several heroic epics also seems to have been prompted by ecclesiastics, such as Waltharius, possibly Beowulf, and the Nibelungenlied, which was probably written through the patronage of bishop Wolfger von Erla of Passau.

== Pictorial representations ==
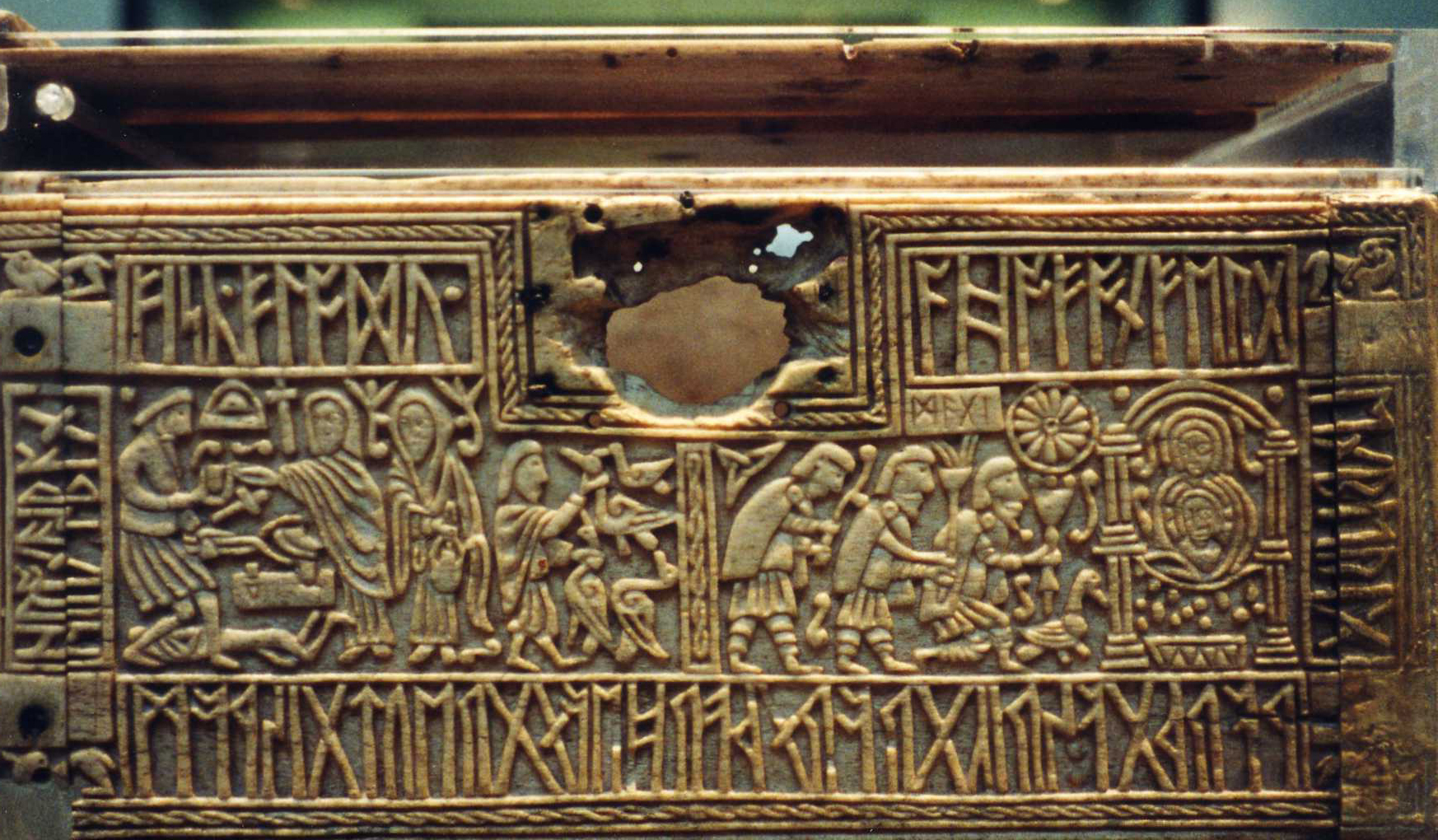
Franks Casket front. To the right is a depiction of the Adoration of the Magi, to the left is a scene from the legend of the hero Wayland the smith.

=== Anglo-Saxon ===
One of the earliest attestations of the heroic tradition is on the Anglo-Saxon Franks Casket (c. 700), which depicts a scene from the legend of Wayland the smith: Wayland is portrayed after having been crippled by king Niðhad. He stands over a headless figure representing Niðhad's children whom he has killed in revenge. The first woman represents Niðhad's daughter bringing a piece of jewelry to be repaired: the figures of the second woman and the man catching birds are unexplained. The top of the Franks Casket also appears to show an archer who is generally identified with Egil, Wayland's brother, and Egil's spouse Ölrún, who appear in the Þiðrekssaga, the Völundarkviða; they are also usually identified on the Pforzen buckle inscription, from c. 570–600.

=== Scandinavian ===
Some of the earliest evidence for Germanic Heroic legends comes in pictorial form on runestones and picture stones. In Sweden, there are nine runic inscriptions, and several image stones from the Viking Age that illustrate scenes from Germanic Heroic legends.

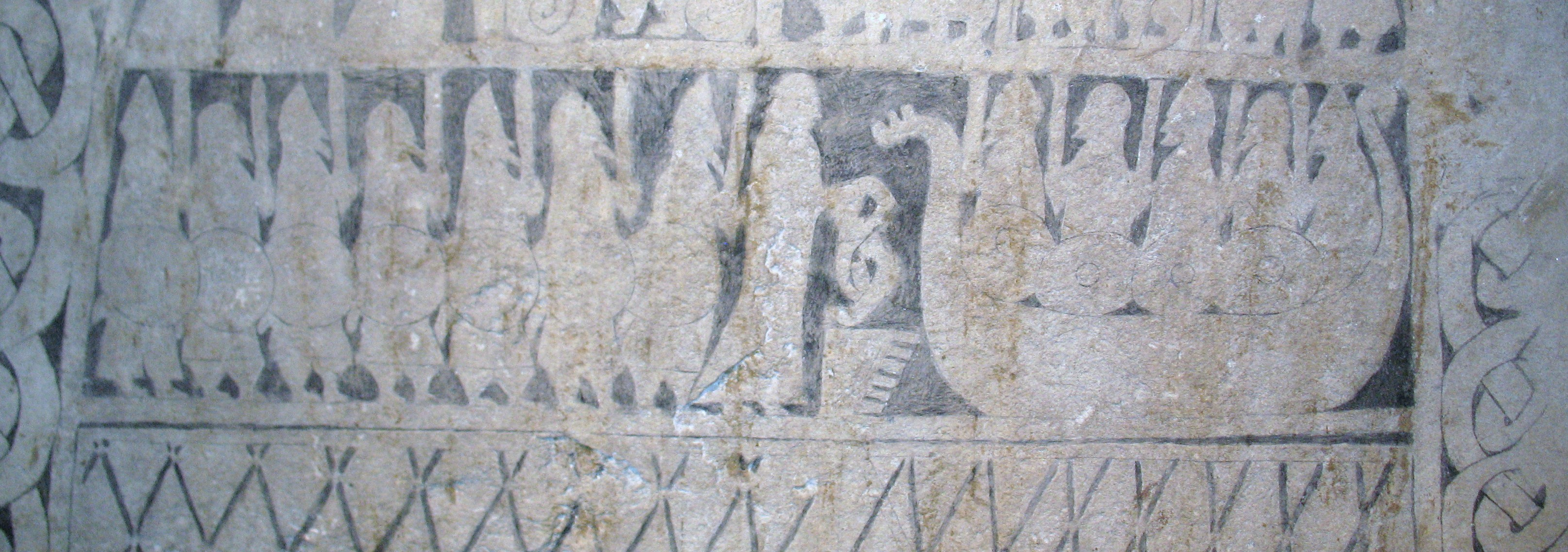
Hildr stands between the two sides and attempts to mediate between father and husband on the picture stone Smiss (I).

The picture stone Smiss I from Gotland, dated around 700, appears to depict a version of the legend of Hildr: a woman stands between two groups of warriors, one of which is arriving on a ship, and seems to seek to mediate between the two sides. This corresponds to a version of the legend known from 12th-century Germany, in which Hildr (Middle High German: Hilde) seeks - ultimately unsuccessfully - to mediate between her father, Hagene, and the man who seized her for marriage, Hetel. The later Norse versions, in which the battle is called the Hjaðningavíg, instead portray Hildr as egging on the combatants, Hǫgni and Heðinn.

The Gotland Image stone Ardre VIII, which has been dated to the 8th c., shows two decapitated bodies, a smithy, a woman, and a winged creature which is interpreted as Wayland flying away from his captivity. Another one, Stora Hammars III, shows a man transformed into a bird who meets a woman, but this one may instead refer to Odin stealing the mead of poetry, in Skáldskaparmál. Several small objects of winged people have also been found, but gods, and some giants, are known to be able to transform into birds in Norse mythology, and Viking Age artwork with human-animal transformations is common.

The Ramsund carving

A number of the runic inscriptions display the deeds accomplished by the young Sigurd, namely his killing of the dragon Fafnir and acquisition of the hoard of the Nibelungs. The Ramsund carving was probably illustrated with the Sigurd saga due to being carved in memory of a man named Sigfried (Sigrøðr, from *Sigi-freðuz). In the carving, Odin, Hœnir and Loki have killed Ótr (6), and paid his wergild. Ótr's brother Fafnir has murdered his own father to have the gold for himself, but when the third brother Regin wanted his share, Fafnir turned into a dragon to protect the hoard. Regin was a skilled smith who crafted the sword Gram and asked his foster-son Sigurd to kill Fafnir (5). Regin then asked Sigurd to cook the dragon's heart for him. Sigurd touched the heart to see if it was done but burnt his finger on it, and put it in his mouth (1). He tasted dragon blood and learnt the language of the birds (2), who told him that Regin had no intention of sharing the treasure with him, but instead planned to kill him. They advised Sigurd to kill Regin who lies beheaded among his smithy tools (3). Sigurd then loaded his horse with the treasure (4). This inscription and others show that the story was known in early 11th c. Sweden and they match details found in the Eddic poems and later sources on the Sigurd legend.

Parts of the legend of Sigurd are also depicted on several 10th-century stone crosses from the British Isles, including several on the Isle of Man, as well as several from England dating to the time of the Danelaw (1016-1042). Several Norwegian stave churches built around 1200 contain carved depictions of the Sigurd legend, including the Hylestad Stave Church and the Vegusdal Stave Church.

The Kirk Andreas cross on the Isle of Man probably contains the only image of the hero Gunnarr from outside Scandinavia: the hero is shown dying in a snake pit while playing a harp. He is also found on the picture stone Södermanland 40, from Västerljung, Sweden. The scene of Gunnarr in the snake pit is also found on several church portals and baptismal fonts from Norway or areas formerly under Norwegian control, mostly from after 1200.

=== Continental ===
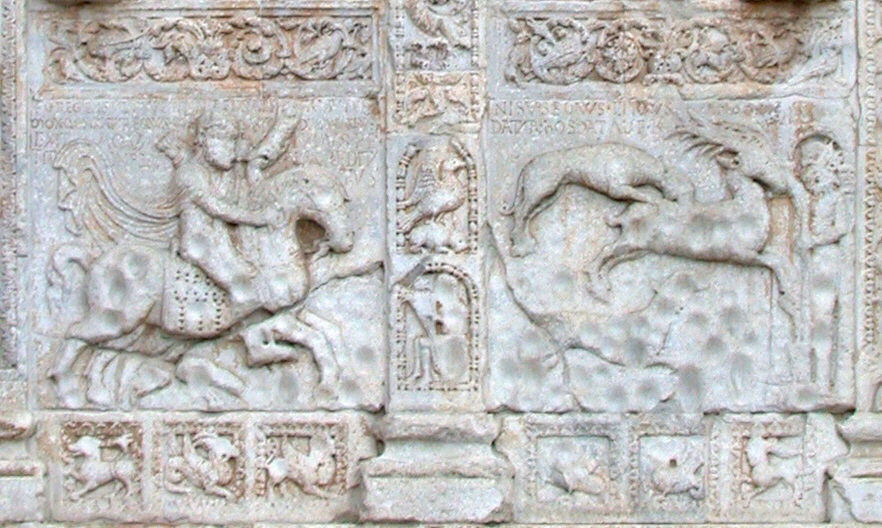
Carving in the church portal of San Zeno Maggiore (c. 1140) in Verona that most likely depicts Dietrich/Theodoric, marked as regem stultum (stupid king), being carried to Hell by an infernal horse. The devil stands in the open mouth of Hell on the far right.

Elements of the legends of Theodoric the Great/Dietrich von Bern appear in some high medieval images. The church portal of San Zeno Maggiore in Verona (c. 1140) appears to depict a legend according to which Dietrich rode to Hell on an infernal horse, a story contained in the Þiðreks saga and alluded to elsewhere. The image of a man freeing another that has been half-devoured by a dragon is also found on a column in the Basel Minster (c. 1185) and on a church facade from the Alsatian abbey of Andlau (c. 1130/40?). This may depict a scene told in one variant in the Þiðreks saga and in another in the epic Virginal in which Dietrich or Hildebrand similarly rescues a man from being swallowed by a dragon. These images may also simply illustrate an allegory of the salvation of the soul from the maw of evil.

Runkelstein Castle outside Bozen in South Tirol was decorated with frescoes depicting courtly and heroic figures, around 1400. The decorations include depictions of triads of figures, among them the heroes Dietrich, Siegfried, and Dietleib von Steiermark, as well as three giants and three giantesses labeled with names from heroic epics. Wildenstein castle in Swabia was decorated with images from the epic Sigenot in the 16th century. Emperor Maximilian I's decision to have Theodoric the Great, together with Charlemagne and King Arthur, be one of the four bronze sculptures on his tomb in Innsbruck was probably influenced by Maximilian's documented interest in the heroic poems.

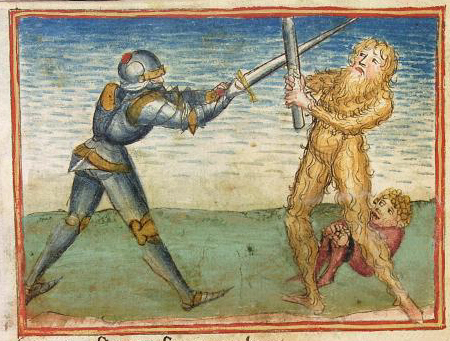
Dietrich fights a wild man before encountering the giant Sigenot (Cod. Pal. germ. 67, fol. 19r). Produced c. 1470 for Margaret of Savoy.

German manuscripts of heroic epics were generally not illuminated until the 15th century, when a small number of illuminated manuscripts begin to appear. The manuscripts all vary widely in their iconography, showing that there was no tradition of depicting heroic events. The first illuminated manuscript of the Nibelungenlied is manuscript b, also known as the Hundeshagenscher codex (c. 1436–1442, in Augsburg), which contains a cycle of 14 illuminations on the events of the poem. A number of manuscripts include an illumination at the beginning of each epic, usually illustrating an important event from the poem such as Siegfried's murder or Ortnit's fight with a dragon. Other manuscripts include cycles of illustrations, such as one of the Rosengarten zu Worms and another of Virginal. Notable is a manuscript of the Dietrich epic Sigenot which was produced c. 1470 for Margaret of Savoy, containing 20 miniatures of very high quality. Printed editions of the poems frequently contained woodcuts.

== Written attestations ==
Detailed attestations of heroic traditions are only found in writing. These written attestations cannot be assumed to be identical to the oral tradition, but represent adaptations of it, undertaken by a particular author at a particular time and place. All of them, but particularly the earlier attestations, were created by and for an audience that already knew the heroic tradition rather than one who was being informed about its contents; they are thus often difficult for modern readers to understand, often contradictory with other attestations, and rarely tell an entire story. No surviving text of Germanic legend appears to have been "oral," but rather all appear to have been conceived as written texts. The oral tradition also continued outside and alongside of the written medium. More recent written compositions can thus contain very old material or legendary variants; conversely, older texts do not necessarily convey an older or more authentic version of the tradition.

Written versions of heroic legend are not confined to a single genre, but appear in various formats, including the heroic lay, in the form of epic, as prose sagas, as well as theatrical plays and ballads. Its written attestations also come from various places and time periods, including the 9th century Carolingian Empire, Anglo-Saxon England in the 8th and 9th centuries, Scandinavia in the 13th century, and what is now Germany from the 12th to the 16th centuries. Heiko Uecker comments that the preserved attestations should not be considered "Germanic," but rather Old English, Old Norse, or Middle High German.

=== Early medieval ===
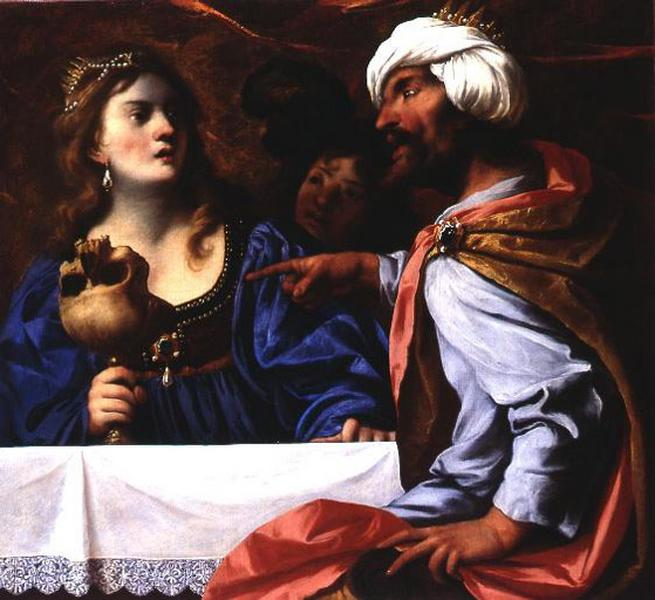
Rosamund forced to drink from the skull of her father by Alboin, after a legend recorded by Paul the Deacon. Painted c. 1650-1660 by Pietro della Vecchia.

The Early Middle Ages produced only a few written heroic texts, as the majority of writing was on religious subjects, including in the vernacular. The 7th-century Pforzen buckle, discovered in 1992 in an Alemannic warrior's grave in southern Germany, has a short runic inscription that may refer to Egil and Ölrun, two figures from the legend of Wayland the smith. An early source in Latin is the Historia Langobardorum (c. 783–796) of Paul the Deacon: it recounts legends told among the Lombards about their king Alboin. The Frankish Emperor Charlemagne (748-814) may have collected heroic poetry. His biographer Einhard wrote that:

He also wrote out the barbarous and ancient songs, in which the acts of the kings and their wars were sung, and committed them to memory. (Vita Karoli Magni, chap. 29)

It has traditionally been supposed that this represented a written collection of heroic poetry, and interest in heroic poetry at Charlemagne's court seems likely. However it is also possible that it was royal praise poetry of the type preserved in the Old High German Ludwigslied. In any case, none of the purported collection has survived, unless it included the earliest extant vernacular heroic text, the Hildebrandslied. The poem tells of the battle of the hero Hildebrand with his own son Hadubrand and alludes to many of the traditions that will later surround Theodoric the Great/Dietrich von Bern. Some potential references to written heroic poems are found in 9th-century monastic library catalogues, and the chronicler Flodoard of Reims (c.893–966) mentions a written narrative about Ermanaric.

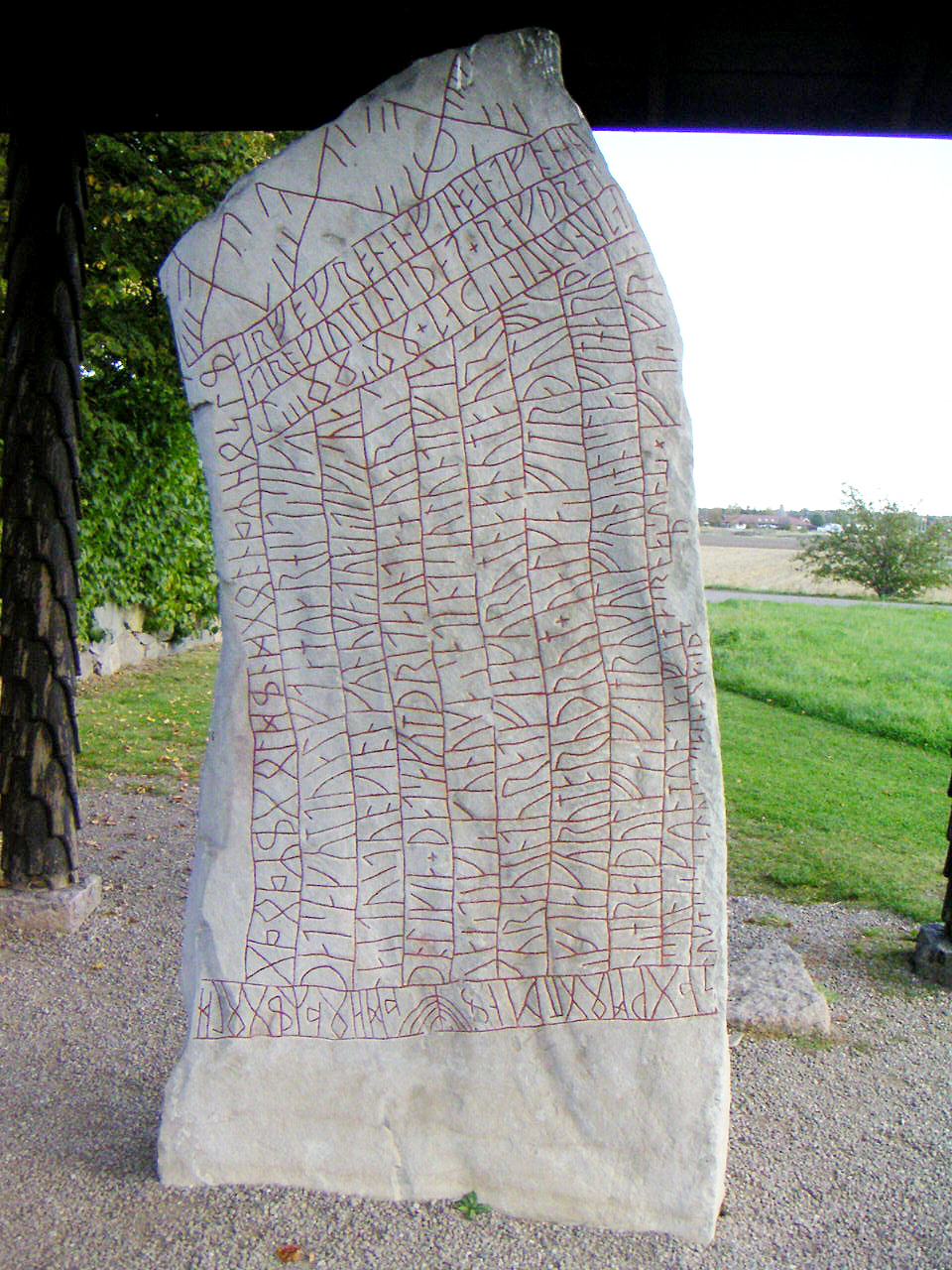
The Rök runestone, from the 9th c.

Viking Age Scandinavia is traditionally believed to have produced a number of poems on heroic subjects in this period, but they were not written down until the 13th century. Although more recent scholarship has challenged the age of most of the surviving written poems, it remains likely that precursors to extant poems existed in the Viking Age. A single stanza on the 9th-century Rök runestone from Östergötland, Sweden, also mentions Dietrich/Theodoric.

Anglo-Saxon England, which had a larger written culture than the continent, also produced several texts on heroic subjects, including the only vernacular heroic epic of the time period, Beowulf. Beowulf deals with the legends of the Scyldings, the ancestors of the Danish royal house, although it is debated whether Beowulf himself is a traditional or invented figure. The poem Widsið is the first person narrator of a scop who describes his travels. The lay is attested in the 10th century Exeter book; it has traditionally been dated to the 7th century but this early dating has been questioned. The lay presents a catalogue of the names of 180 rulers and tribes from heroic legend, occasionally providing some details of a narrative, such as that of the Scyldings and of Eormanric (Ermanaric). Another poem by a fictional scop, Deor, presents itself as the narrative of Deor, who has lost his position at court to the Heorrenda, a famous singer from the legend of Hildr, and contains several other allusions to heroic material, such as to the legend of Wayland the Smith. The legend of Walter of Aquitaine is told in the fragmentary Waldere, which also includes mentions of the fights of the heroes Ðeodric (Dietrich von Bern) and Widia (Witege), son of Wayland, against giants. The Finnesburg Fragment tells a story, also relayed in Beowulf of a surprise attack led by the Frisian king Finn on visiting Danes led by his brother-in-law, the Danish king Hnæf. It is not clear if Finnesburg Fragment is an old poem or a recent composition, nor how long it originally was.

A number of brief mentions in Latin ecclesiastical texts indicate the popularity of heroic traditions among the early medieval clergy while simultaneously condemning it as a distraction from salvation. This popularity led to the writing of the Latin epic Waltharius (9th or 10th century) in the area around Lake Constance, which reworked the legend of Walter of Aquitaine. A number of early medieval Latin chronicles also contain material from the heroic tradition. Widukind of Corvey's The Deeds of the Saxons contains what is commonly taken to be a lost legend about the last independent king of the Thuringians, Hermanafrid, and his death at the hands of his vassal Iring at the instigation of Theuderic I, king of the Franks. The Annals of Quedlinburg (early 11th century), includes legendary material about Dietrich von Bern, Ermanaric, and Attila in the guise of history.

=== High and late medieval Scandinavian ===
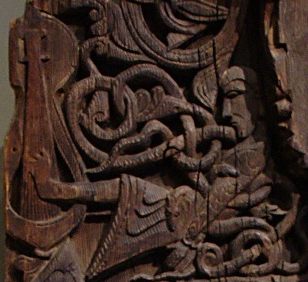
Gunnar plays a Germanic lyre (harpa or hörpu in Old Norse) while dying in a snake pit at Hylestad Stave Church, c. 1200. The scene is narrated in the Eddic poem Atlakviða.

Some of the oldest written Scandinavian sources relate to the same heroic matter as found in Beowulf, namely Langfeðgatal (12th c.), the Lejre Chronicle (late 12th c.), Short History of the Kings of Denmark (c. 1188), and the Gesta Danorum by Saxo Grammaticus (c. 1200). At this time in Iceland, the now lost Skjöldunga saga was written, c. 1200, and like parts of Gesta Danorum and Beowulf it dealt with the legendary Danish Scylding (Skjöldung) dynasty, and it would be the main source for future sagas on the Danish Scylding dynasty's relations with its Swedish Scylfing (Yngling) counterpart. Sometime c. 1220–1230, Snorri Sturluson finished writing the Heimskringla, a history of the Norwegian kings, having previously spent two years in Norway and Sweden (1218–20). In the saga, Snorri fleshes out the skaldic poem Ynglingatal with Scandinavian heroic legends relating to the Norse kings, such as the 6th c. Swedish king Aðils, about whom it includes native legends related to some of those found in Beowulf. Snorri is also the author of the Prose Edda (c. 1220–1241). It contains a part called Skáldskaparmál that has a list of kennings and heitis for young poets, and he provided it with narratives to provide background for them.

The Poetic Edda is a collection of Old Norse mythological and heroic poems that was probably first compiled in the mid-13th century in Iceland and is known from two major manuscripts today, of which the Codex Regius (c. 1270) is the most important. The Codex Regius groups mythological poems into a first section and a series of 19 heroic poems into a second; scholars believe that the two sections of poems likely come from two originally separate written collections. Although the legends in Poetic Edda are very old, the poems themselves come from different times, and some may have been written in the 13th century: normally the poems Völundarkviða and Atlakviða are believed to be from the Viking Age, while the three lays concerning Gudrun, the Atlamál, and Helreið Brynhildar are thought to be very recent. Some poems, such as Hamðismál, are judged to be old by some scholars and recent by others. The heroic poems open with 3 concerning Sigurd's half brother Helgi Hundingsbane, continue with a group of lays about Sigurd, followed by a group about the destruction of the Burgundians, and close with lays about Svanhildr and Jörmunrekkr (Ermanaric), all loosely connected via short prose passages and through the figures of Sigurd and Gudrun.

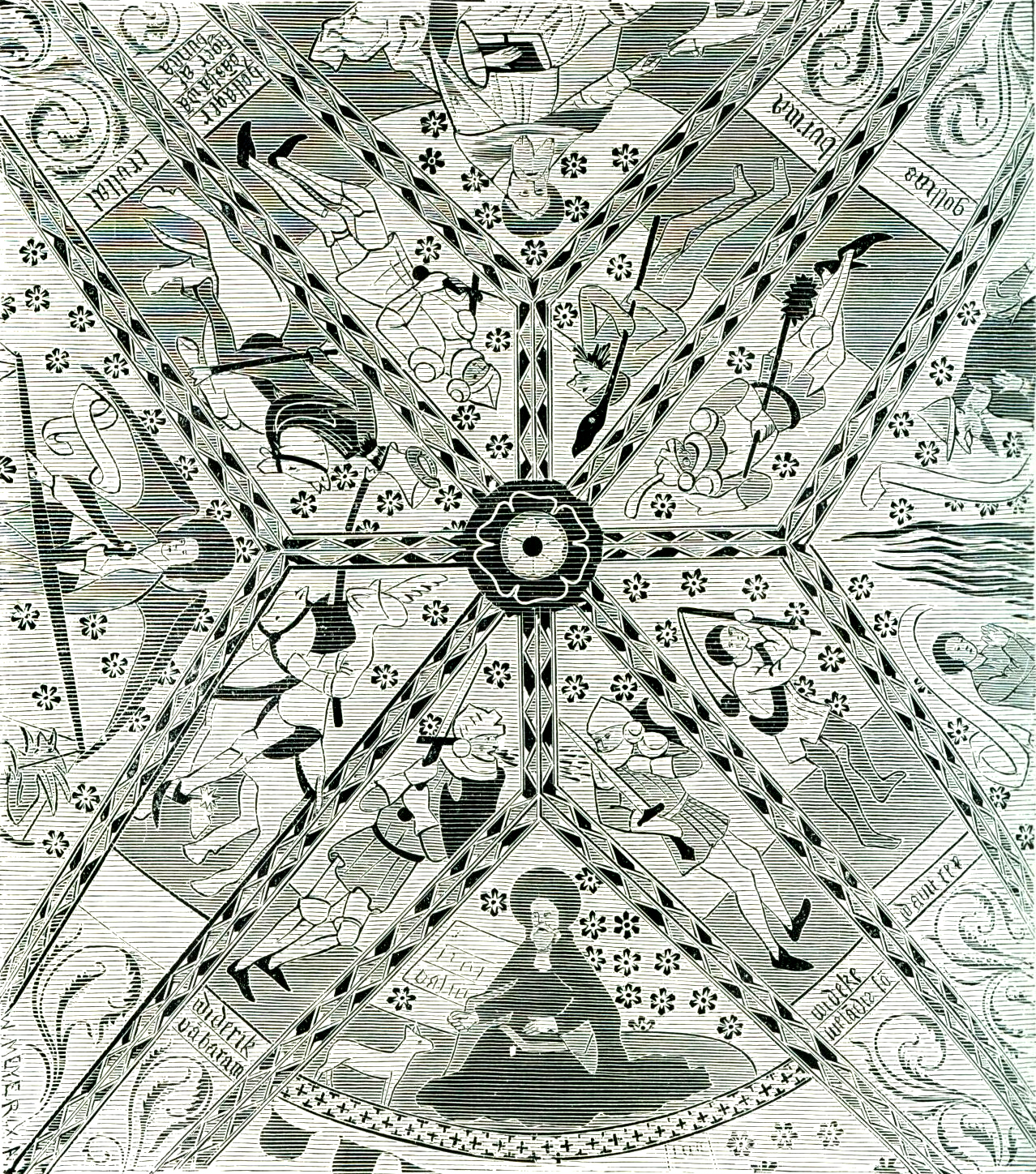
Fresco by Albertus Pictor of eight heroes, including Dietrich von Bern fighting against Witege from the Þiðreks saga, found on the vault of Floda church in Södermanland, Sweden, painted around 1479. Dietrich is breathing fire and is found in the lower part of the image.

In the mid-13th century, legendary sagas (Old Norse: fornaldarsögur) began to be written in the Old Norse vernacular, some of which derive from Scandinavian and Germanic heroic legends. Those sagas which contain older heroic legend are given the German name Heldensagas ("heroic sagas") in modern scholarly usage. Much of the content of these sagas is derived from Eddic poems, and other elements likely derive from then current oral tradition. Some may be additions of the saga authors. Traditionally, six sagas are counted as Heldensagas: Völsunga saga, Norna-Gests þáttr, Hervarar saga, Hrólfs saga kraka, Sǫgubrot af nokkrum fornkonungum, and Ásmundar saga kappabana. The best-known today, the Völsunga saga, was probably written in Norway and shows knowledge of the Þiðreks saga (see below): it narrates the story of Sigurd and his ancestors, the destruction of the Burgundians, and the death of Jörmunrekr (Ermanaric), moving their location to Scandinavia and including many mythological elements. The Hrólfs saga kraka may be the second best-known legendary saga. It was popular in the Middle Ages, and it still is, but its modern popularity among scholars is due to it being a Beowulf analogue, with which it shares at least eight legendary characters. The Hervarar saga combines several different stories that are united by the handing down of the cursed sword Tyrfing through generations. It preserves what is considered to be one of the oldest heroic lays, the Battle of the Goths and Huns, and poetry such as the Waking of Angantýr, the Riddles of Gestumblindi and the Samsey poetry.

Another important source for heroic legend was the Þiðreks saga, a compilation of heroic material mostly from northern Germany, composed in Bergen, Norway in the mid 13th century. By its own account, it was composed from oral German sources, although it is possible that some written materials were used as well. The Þiðreks saga is not a purely legendary saga, but also contains material about King Arthur and Apollonius of Tyre. It is probably part of the tradition of chivalric sagas - translations of courtly material - initiated by king Haakon IV of Norway. The core of the saga is the biography of the hero Dietrich von Bern (Þiðrekr af Bern). The saga appears to assemble all of the heroic material from the continent and is thus a valuable attestations of which heroic legends were being told on the continent in the 13th century, including several that are otherwise lost.

=== High and late medieval German ===
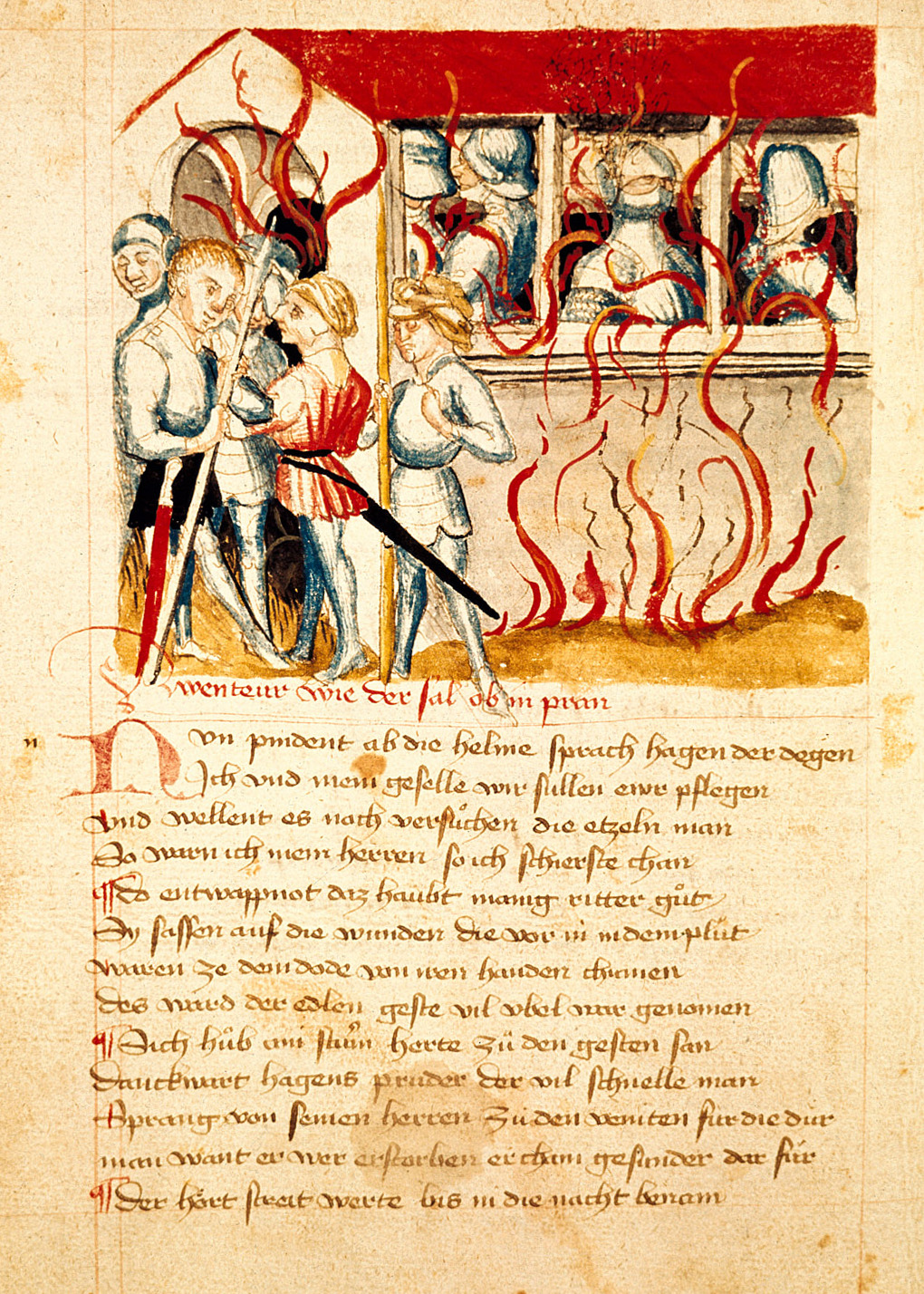
The Huns set fire to Etzel's hall with the Burgundians inside. Illumination from the Hundeshagenscher Codex (mid-15th century).

From the 11th to the 12th centuries, heroic legend on the continent is mentioned only in brief allusions. This includes a tradition of criticizing the legendary life of Dietrich von Bern as not according with the life of the historical Theodoric the Great, found in works such as the Historia mundi of Frutolf of Michelsberg (c. 1100), the Historia de duabus civitatibus (1134-1136) of Otto von Freising, and the vernacular Kaiserchronik (after 1146). Allusions to heroic legends are also found in a number of vernacular literary works of courtly romance and poetry from the 12th century, including by Walther von der Vogelweide, Heinrich von Veldeke, and Wolfram von Eschenbach.

From the 13th to 16th centuries, many heroic traditions enter writing in Germany and enjoy great popularity. Werner Hoffmann defined five subjects of heroic epics in medieval Germany: the Nibelungen (Burgundians and Siegfried), the lovers Walther and Hildegund, the maiden Kudrun, kings Ortnit and Wolfdietrich, and Dietrich von Bern. He found the heroic epics to be closely related to another genre, the so-called Spielmannsdichtung ("minstrel poetry"). The anonymous authorship of the Middle High Germans heroic poems forms an important distinction from other poetic genres, such as romance, but is shared with Spielmannsdichtung. Although these epics all appear to be written compositions, the amount of differences between manuscripts indicates that their texts were not fixed and that redactors could insert additional material from the oral tradition and otherwise edit the epics.

Heroic poetry begins to be composed in writing in Germany with the Nibelungenlied (c. 1200), which updated the heroic legends with elements of the popular literary genre of its time, courtly romance. The epics written after the Nibelungenlied maintain this hybrid nature. For this reason Middle High German heroic poetry is also called "late heroic poetry" (späte Heldendichtung). The Nibelungenlied narrates the wooing of Kriemhild (Gudrun) by the hero Siegfried, his aid to king Gunther in the latter's wooing of Brünhild (Brunhild), Siegfried's murder at the hands of Gunther's vassal Hagen, and Kriemhild's treacherous revenge on Hagen and her brothers after inviting them to the hall of Kriemhild's new husband, Etzel (Attila). A direct reaction to the heroic nihilism of the Nibelungenlied is found in the Kudrun (1230?), in which material also found in Old English and Old Norse about the heroine Hildr serves as the prologue to the - likely invented - story of her daughter, Kudrun.

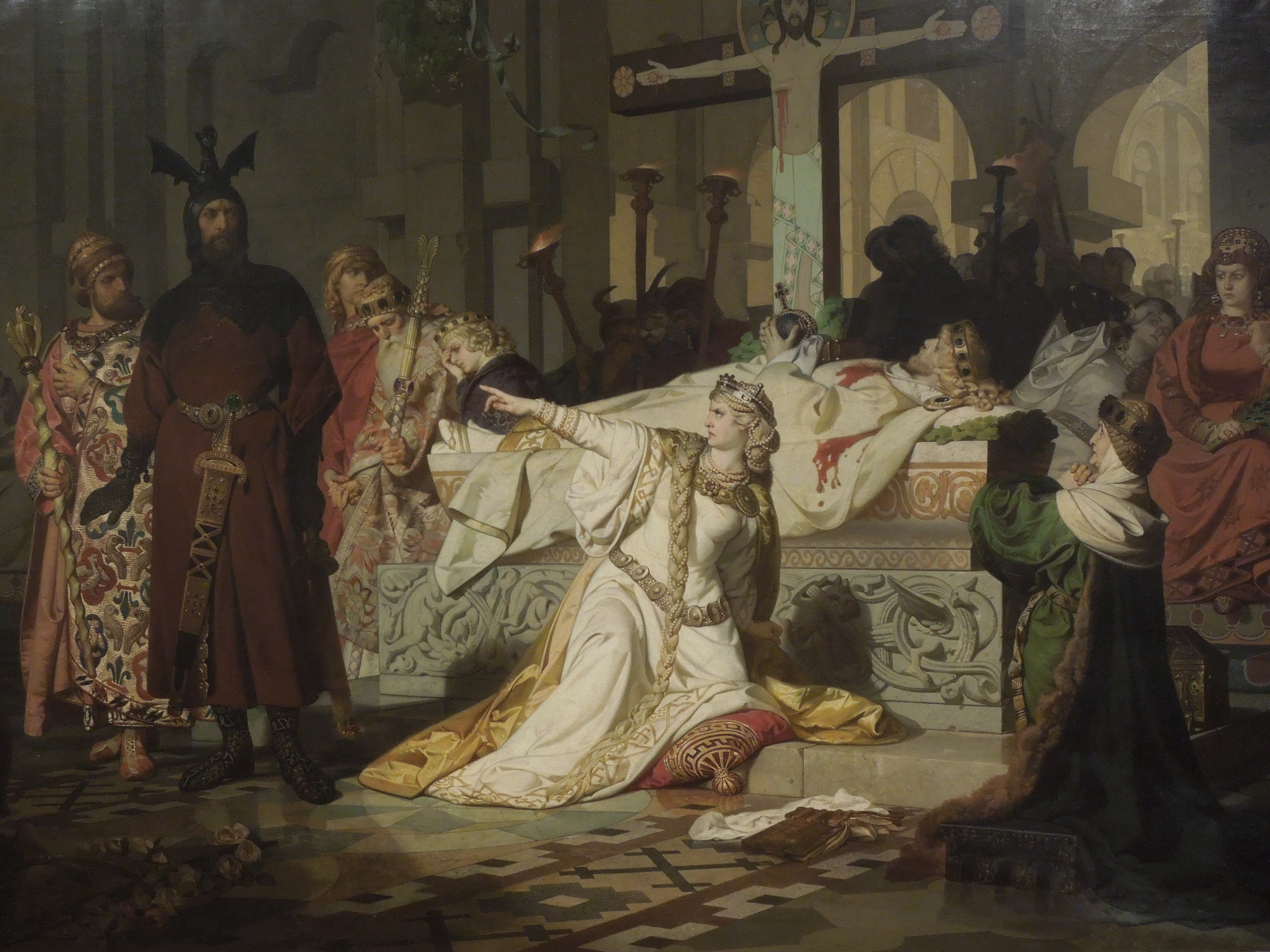
Kriemhild accuses Hagen of murdering Siegfried after Siegfried's wounds begin to bleed in Hagen's presence. Painting by Emil Lauffer, 1879.

From 1230 onward, several heroic epics, of which 14 are known to us, were written concerning the hero Dietrich von Bern, forming a literary cycle comparable to that around King Arthur (the Matter of Britain) or Charlemagne (the Matter of France). These texts are typically divided into "historical" and "fantastical" epics, depending on whether they concern Dietrich's battles with Ermenrich (Ermanaric) and exile at the court of Etzel (Attila) or his battles with mostly supernatural opponents such as dwarfs, dragons, and giants. The "historical" Dietrich epic Rabenschlacht (c. 1280) narrates the death of the sons of Etzel (Attila) and of Dietrich's brother Diether at the hands of his traitorous vassal, Witege and may have origins in the Battle of Nedao (454). The "fantastical" Dietrich epics are typically thought to be later material, possibly invented on the basis of earlier motifs in the 13th century, although Dietrich's battles with giants are already mentioned in the Old English Waldere fragment. The earliest attested of the "fantastical" epics is the Eckenlied, of which a single stanza is contained in the Codex Buranus (c. 1230). Closely connected to the Dietrich epics, the combined epics Ortnit and Wolfdietrich (both c. 1230) have unclear connections to the Migration Period and may be inventions of the thirteenth century, although Merovingian origins are also suggested for Wolfdietrich.

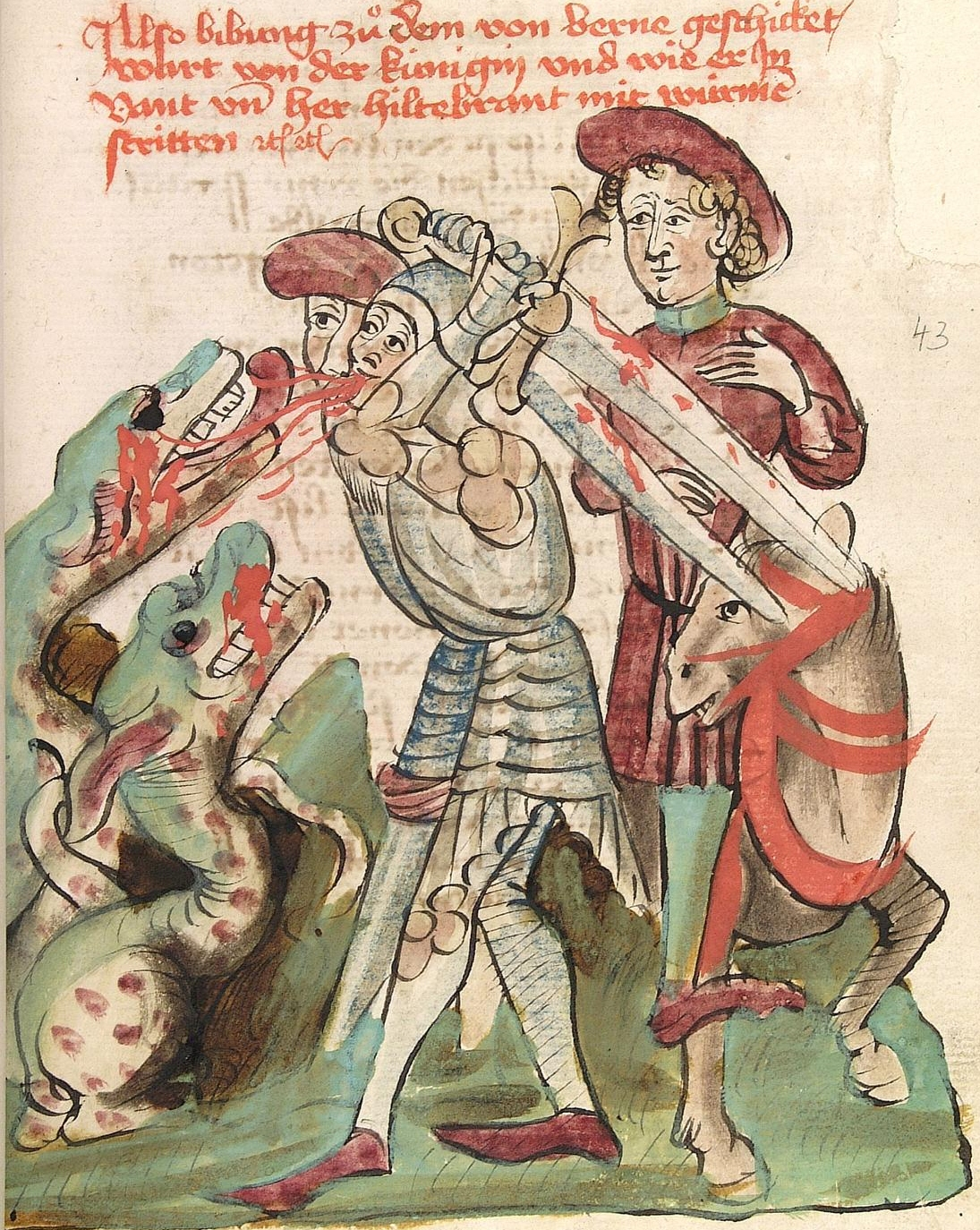
Scene from the poem Virginal: Dietrich von Bern and Hildebrand fight against dragons, with Dietrich breathing fire. UBH Cod.Pal.germ. 324 fol. 43r, (c. 1440).

Almost all of the texts originate in the Bavarian-speaking areas of Bavaria and Austria, with several texts about Dietrich von Bern having origins in Tirol; a few others seem to have originated in the Alemannic dialect area in modern south-west Germany and Switzerland. Evidence for the continued existence of heroic legends in what is now Northern Germany and the Low Countries is provided by the Þiðreks saga on the one hand, and the early modern ballad Ermenrichs Tod (printed 1560 in Lübeck) on the other. The latter tells a garbled version of the killing of Ermenrich (Ermanaric) also found in early medieval Latin sources and the Eddic poem Hamðismál.

Very few new heroic poems, and no new heroic epics, were written after 1300, although the existing ones remained popular. Beginning in the 14th century, heroic poems come to be collected together in so-called Heldenbücher ("books of heroes"); the Heldenbuch of Diebolt von Hanau (after 1475) contains a text known as the Heldenbuch-Prosa which provides a brief history of the entire heroic world. Possibly originating in the 14th century but only attested in 1530, the Lied vom Hürnen Seyfrid recorded a number of details about the hero Siegfried absent in the Nibelungenlied but attested in Old Norse tradition. The ballad the Jüngeres Hildebrandslied (c. 1450) concerns the same material as the early medieval Hildebrandslied. Finally, a number of heroic texts were adopted as carnival plays (Fastnachtsspiele), including by the Nuremberg poet Hans Sachs (1494-1564).

== Heroic poetry ==
=== Heroic lay and heroic epic ===
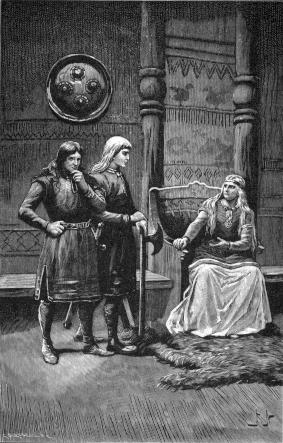
Gudrun inciting her sons in Guðrúnarhvöt.

There is disagreement about the relationship between heroic lay and heroic epic in current scholarship. According to the influential model developed by Andreas Heusler (1905), Germanic heroic poetry mostly circulated in heroic lays (Heldenlieder): relatively short pieces, of similar length to the Eddic poems, that had fixed wording and were memorized. These poems could then later be expanded into full-sized epics in writing. "Neo-Heuslerians" continue to follow this model with some adjustments, emphasizing in particular that the common Germanic form was short, as found in the Scandinavian examples. Hermann Reichert argues that only the Hildebrandslied is a genuine example of an early heroic lay, discounting the age of Norse examples that are generally dated early, such as Atlakviða.

Other scholarship has instead argued that the poems could be of variable length and were improvised with each performance, according to the oral forumulaic theory of oral poetry, According to Edward Haymes, common Germanic heroic poetry appears to have been "oral epic poetry", which made heavy use of repetitions and formula within the metrical scheme of alliterative verse. Some signs of oral epic style in Beowulf are inconsistencies from scene to scene, as details, such the presence of objects or individuals, are mentioned or omitted from performance to performance. Nevertheless, no "oral" heroic poetry has survived, as all the written attestations appear to be written compositions.

Eddic poems, including the supposedly oldest, the Atlakviða, show important differences from typical oral formulaic style and the style of Old English, Old Saxon, and Old High German heroic poetry. Haymes, an adherent of the oral epic, suggests that this means that the Eddic poems were not improvised, but instead memorized verbatim according to Heusler's model, something also suggested by the use of similar techniques in oral traditions such as Somali oral poetry. It is possible that the sort of literal memorization required of Norse skaldic poetry resulted in the loss of oral formulaic improvised poetry in an Old Norse context; Haymes and Samples suggest that this same fixed quality may have driven the change from heroic poetry to prose sagas in Iceland and Scandinavia.

=== Poetic form ===
Originally, the Germanic-speaking peoples shared a metrical and poetic form, alliterative verse, which is attested in very similar forms in Old Saxon, Old High German and Old English, and in a modified form in Old Norse. The common form consists of lines of four stressed beats, with a caesura dividing the line in half. At least two beats must alliterate across the caesura, forming what in German is called a Langzeile ("long line"). The final beat generally receives no alliteration. Any vowel could alliterate with any other vowel. Klaus von See gives the following examples from Old English, Old High German, and Old Norse (stressed syllable underlined, alliteration bolded, and || representing the caesura):

Oft Scyld Scēfing || scēaþena þrēatum (Beowulf v. 4)

forn her ostar giweit || floh her Ōtachres nīd (Hildebrandslied v. 18)

Vilcat ec reiði || rícs þióðkonungs (Grípisspá v. 26)

The poetic forms diverge among the different languages from the 9th century onward. Thus, the Old High German line shows a higher number of unstressed syllables than is typical for Old English or Old Saxon alliterative verse. Eddic poetry is written in stanzas, as opposed to the non-stanzaic form found in Old Saxon, Old High German, and most Old English poetry. The main meter used in the Eddic heroic poems is Fornyrðislag; it tends to short lines, with only four syllables in each half-line. Lines with more syllables are called málaháttr, following Snorri Sturluson, although it was probably not an independent meter.

In Middle High German, alliterative verse is replaced by stanzas featuring end-rhyme. These stanzas existed in a variety of forms and tend to use a form of Langzeile of undetermined origin consisting of three stresses, a caesura, and then three stresses. The epics use various stanzaic forms, including the Nibelungen-stanza, the Kudrun-stanza, the Hildebrandston, Heunenweise and the Bernerton. These stanzas often feature variant Langzeilen. The Nibelungen stanza can serve as an example, as its final half-line has an additional stress (|| represents the caesura, an acute accent represents a stressed syllable):

Ze Wórmez bí dem Ríne || si wónten mít ir kráft.
in díente vón ir lánden || vil stólziu ríterscáft
mit lóbelíchen éren || unz án ir éndes zít.
si stúrben sit jǽmerlíche || von zwéier édelen fróuwen nít. (Nibelungenlied, stanza 6)

Many stanzas of the Nibelungenlied are constructed in a much less regular manner. The Middle High German rhyming stanzas were meant to be sung, and melodies survive for the Hildebrandston, Heunenweise, and Bernerton.

=== Style ===
In heroic poetry, the use of poetic epithets, compounds, and formulaic language is frequent. The openings of poems such as the Hildebrandslied, Beowulf, and the Nibelungenlied all use a similar opening formula referring to the oral nature of the legends. The shorter poems such as the Hildebrandslied and the Eddic lays have a fast-paced style that heavily mixes dialogue with action. West Germanic style tends more to have longer lines and sentences with an emphasis on the use of poetic synonyms (copia), whereas Old Norse poetry tends to be narrated tersely.

Eddic poetry rarely features enjambment across lines. West Germanic heroic poetry tends to use what Andreas Heusler called Bogenstil ("bow style"): sentences are spread across various lines and often begin at the caesura. Middle High German heroic poetry follows a similar style, including occasional enjambment across stanzas.

=== Singers and authors ===
A minstrel sings of famous deeds by J. R. Skelton (c. 1909)

Written heroic poems are typically anonymous. There is no information as to whether a class of professional singers were responsible for composing heroic poetry in Germanic times. Sources are also vague for most of the Early Middle Ages. By the late 9th century, a figure known in Old English as a scop, in Old High German as a skof, and in Latin texts as a vates or psalmista is attested as a type of singer or minstrel resident at the court of a particular lord. A scop is depicted singing heroic material in Beowulf. The scop could also function as a þyle, a keeper of past knowledge (þula). It is generally assumed that the poem was recited with musical accompaniment.

In Scandinavia there was also the figure of the skald. However, skaldic poetry was considered a separate genre from heroic poetry, so that the role of skalds in transmitting or composing heroic poetry is unclear. In any case, knowledge of the heroic tradition was necessary in order to compose and understand skaldic poetry, and skaldic poetry shows a number of stylistic similarities to Norse heroic poetry. Saxo Grammaticus refers to a "Saxon singer" (cantor saxonicus) who sings a heroic song in Denmark.

For the Middle High German period, it seems likely that heroic poems were transmitted by the same class of minstrels as Spruchdichtung. The Spruchdichter Der Marner refers in one verse to constantly being asked to sing songs on heroic subjects.

== End of the heroic tradition ==
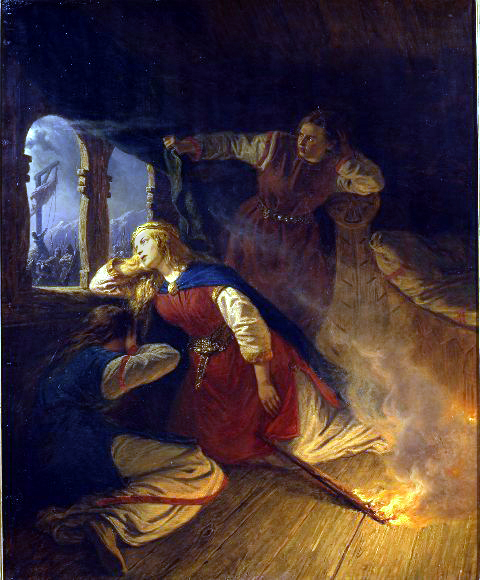
"Signhild" from the legend of Hagbard and Signy (1861) by Josef Wilhelm Wallander.

The heroic tradition in England died out with the Norman Conquest, which replaced the Germanic-speaking aristocracy who had cultivated Germanic heroic legend with a Romance-speaking one.

In Germany, the heroic tradition largely disappears from writing around 1600; it is likely that the oral tradition had been dying out prior to this. The primary audience had already changed from the nobility to the urban bourgeoisie. Some texts continued to be read in the form of Heldenbücher, while a prose version of the Lied vom Hürnen Seyfrid, in which the original names and most connections to heroic legend were altered, continued to be printed into the 19th century. The Jüngeres Hildebrandslied continued to be printed into the 18th century and is found in 19th and 20th century collections of ballads. Versions of the epic Kudrun were preserved in the Südeli ballads (18th century) and a ballad called Die Meererin, recorded in 1867 from Gottschee, while elements of the legend of Wolfdietrich were also preserved in some popular ballads.

The Gök runestone (c. 1010- c. 1050 (Note: The style is Pr1-Pr2. Pr1 is dated to 1010-1050 and Pr2 is dated to 1020-1050.)) has been said to be a case in point of how the older heroic poetry dissolved in Sweden, as it uses the same imagery as the Ramsund carving, but a Christian cross has been added and the images are combined in a way that completely distorts the internal logic of events. The insertion of explanatory prose into some poems of the Poetic Edda is argued by Edward Haymes and Susan Samples to represent a similar loss of tradition, showing that audiences no longer understood the poems in their original forms. Victor Millet writes that the heroic tradition in Scandinavia barely survives its literary blossoming in the 13th century. However, the heroic poetry survived in a new form in the Pan-Scandinavian medieval ballads, as the heroic ballads. The medieval ballads stayed popular from their origin in the Middle Ages, until the 20th century, and from the rural illiterate to the middle and upper classes that collected and printed them.

== Modern influence ==
=== Early Modern Era ===
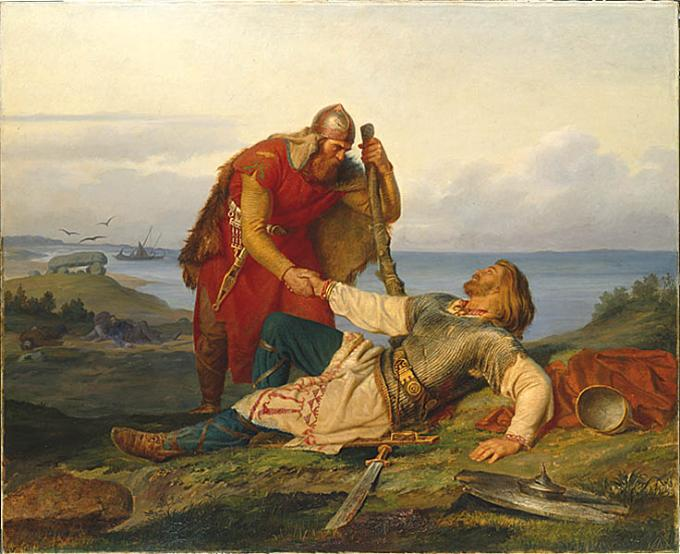
Orvar-Odd and Hjalmar bid each other farewell Mårten Eskil Winge (1866).

In 1514, the Danish work Gesta Danorum by Saxo Grammaticus was published for the first time, and in 1555, Olaus Magnus published his Historia de Gentibus Septentrionalibus.

During the late 17th c. and the early 18th, there was a series of first publications of legendary sagas by Swedish scholars, with translations in Latin and Swedish, done in support of Sweden's "noble past" and "Age of Greatness". In 1672, Olaus Verelius published Hervarar saga for the first time, and in 1697, Johan Peringskiöld published the Heimskringla. In 1719, his son Johan Fredrik Peringskiöld published Sögubrot af nokkrum fornkonungum, and in 1722 Ásmundar saga kappabana. In 1737, Eric Julius Björner published the collection Nordiska kämpadater of legendary sagas, which consisted of sagas such as the Völsunga saga, Friðþjófs saga hins frœkna, Hrólfs saga kraka, Norna-Gests þáttr, and Ragnars saga loðbrókar. (Note: The others were Áns saga bogsveigis, Frá Fornjóti ok hans ættmönnum, Hálfdanar saga Brönufóstra, Hálfdanar saga Eysteinssonar, Hálfs saga ok Hálfsrekka, Helga þáttr Þórissonar, Hrómundar saga Gripssonar, Sörla saga sterka and Þorsteins þáttr bæjarmagns.) The Prose Edda would be published in Latin by Johan Göransson in 1746.

In Denmark, in 1665, parts of the newly rediscovered Poetic Edda were published by Peder Resen, but these Eddic poems did not cover the heroic matter. The most influential work from this time may have been the Thomas Bartholin's Antiquitatum Danicarum de causis contempta a Danis adhuc gentilibus mortis (1689), with long scenes from sagas where heroes are followed while they smiling meet death and earn well-deserved places with Odin in Valhalla.

=== Romantic movement ===
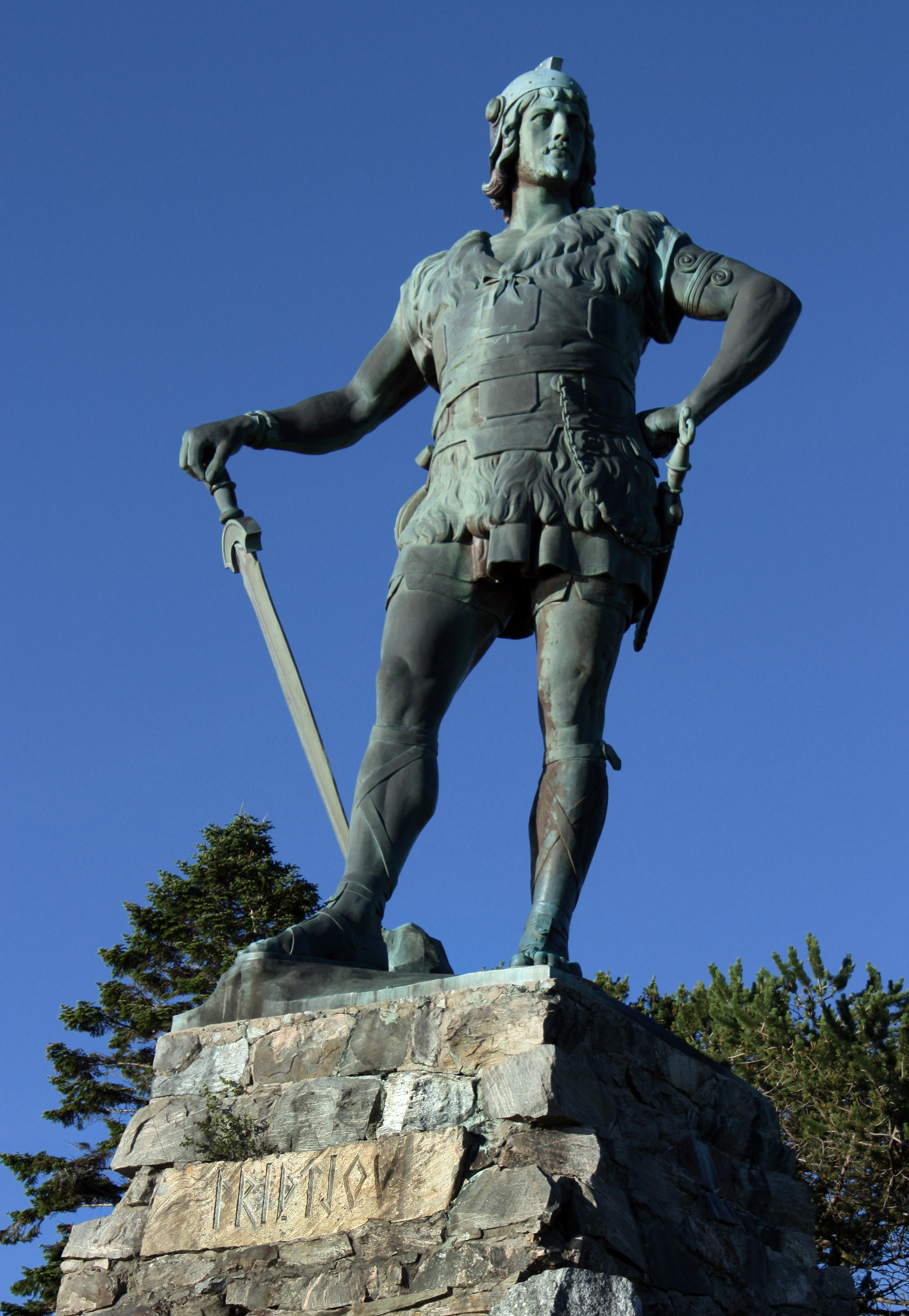
Statue of Fridtjof Max Unger (1913)

The period from the late 18th century to the 1830s was characterized by an interest in folklore and folk practice (such as folk ballads), and works that had previously been ignored from the Middle Ages and the Renaissance.

==== Translations ====
The manuscript of the Nibelungenlied was first rediscovered in 1755. It was quickly dubbed the "German Iliad" (deutsche Ilias) by Swiss scholar Johann Jakob Bodmer, who published his own partial adaptation of the second half of the epic. Although the poem had many detractors, it received support from the proto-Romantic Sturm und Drang movement and later from important Romantic thinkers such as August Wilhelm Schlegel. Romantic figures such as Ludwig Tieck, Christian August Vulpius, and Friedrich Heinrich von der Hagen worked on producing adaptations or editions of older heroic materials. The Nibelungenlied appeared in a popular modern German translation by Karl Simrock in 1827. This translation remains influential today. Simrock also translated other heroic poems such as the Kudrun, Alpharts Tod, and the Rosengarten zu Worms, connecting them as Das kleine Heldenbuch.

In Great Britain in 1768, Thomas Gray published Norse Odes and in 1770, Thomas Percy published Five Pieces of Runic Poetry, which included The Incantation of Hervor and The Dying Ode of Regner Lodbrog. Old Norse heroic matter would from then on be a part of the literary circles of Britain.

The first attempt to create a modern edition and translation of the poems of the Poetic Edda was undertaken by the Danish Arnamagnæan Institute in 1787, however only a partial volume was ever produced. The first modern edition was undertaken by Friedrich von der Hagen in 1812; he followed it with a German translation in 1814. Jacob and Wilhelm Grimm produced their own edition and translation in 1815. Translations of some heroic poems into English were undertaken by William Herbert. (Note: He translated Helreið Brynhildar in 1804, Atlakviða and Sigurðarkviða inn skamma in 1839, and Vǫlundarkviða in 1840.) Modern study of heroic legend began in 1829 when Wilhelm Grimm published his Deutsche Heldensage, a compilation of various attestations to the heroic tradition that included some reconstructed legends and Grimm's theories on their origins.

In 1818, Danish scholar Peter Erasmus Müller published a compendium of the legendary sagas, and in 1829–30 Carl Christian Rafn published 31 sagas in Fornaldarsögur Norðrlanda, which became influential in defining the genre.

The first modern English translation of Beowulf appeared in 1833 (Grímur Jónsson Thorkelin having published the first scholarly edition in 1815). It is intrinsically connected to the evolution of romantic nationalism during the 19th century. It was used by early scholars to recover lost cultural memories, and as confirmation of their national identities.

==== Derivational works ====
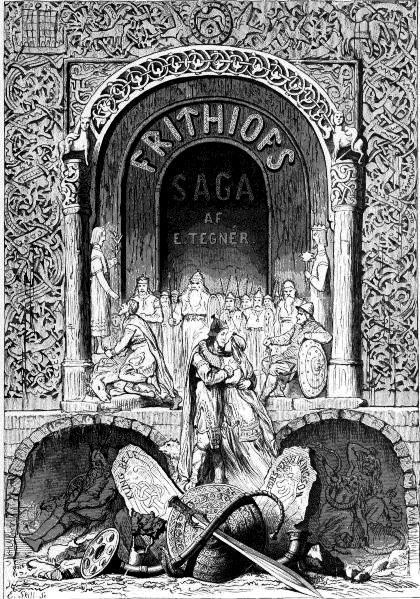
The title page of Fritiofs saga (1876)

Sir Walter Scott, often considered the originator of the historical novel, often commented that he was inspired by Old Norse sources, and he mainly acquired them from Thomas Bartholin, Olaus Magnus and Torfaeus. He subscribed to the sagas that were printed from 1770 by the Arnamagnæan Institute in Copenhagen, and when he died in 1832, he had an impressive library on the then available Old Norse literature. Some of the elements that he found in Scandinavian legends were dwarfs, magic swords, werewolves, Valkyries, spae wives, and dragons. (Note: Scandinavian influence is evident in novels such as Ivanhoe, The Pirate and The Antiquary, and it is also evident in poems, such as The Lay of the Last Minstrel, The Lady of the Lake, The Lord of the Isles, Rokeby and Harold the Dauntless.)

In the romantic period, several plays were written in German on the basis of the Nibelungenlied, as well as many ballads, such as Siegfrieds Schwert ("Siegfried's Sword") by Ludwig Uhland. The first German author to adapt Norse sources was the Romantic Friedrich de la Motte-Fouqué, who in 1808-1810 wrote a popular three-part play, Sigurd: Held des Nordens ("Sigurd: The Hero of the North"), mostly on the basis of the Latin translations of the Völsunga saga and the Prose Edda.

In 1825, Esaias Tegnér published Frithiof's Saga, a retelling which rose quickly to international fame. It was admired by people like Johann Wolfgang Goethe, Kaiser Wilhelm II, William Morris and Selma Lagerlöf, and it inspired undergraduate textbooks, statues, paintings, engravings, seafaring anthologies, travel literature, children's books, works of theater, operas and musicals. Only during the 19th c. it was translated 15 times into English, and into almost every major language in Europe, where it was of immense popularity. Some of its cultural influence can be found in Longfellow's poetry, bridal quest romance, the Victorian view of Norway, national epics inspired by folklore, and in the history of ice skating.

=== 1840s to World War 1 ===
From 1843 to 1849, Karl Simrock, who had already translated the Nibelungenlied and various other poems, attempted to create a new German national epic in the same meter as the Nibelungenlied, the Amelungenlied, based on material about Dietrich von Bern. However, the epic did not become popular with the public. In 19th century Germany, the Nordic tradition with its many mythological elements came to be seen as more original than the German heroic texts, and thus many adaptations relied primarily or partially on Nordic texts. Friedrich Hebbel's three-part tragedy Die Nibelungen (1861), for instance, added mythical elements from the Norse tradition to the plot of the Nibelungenlied.

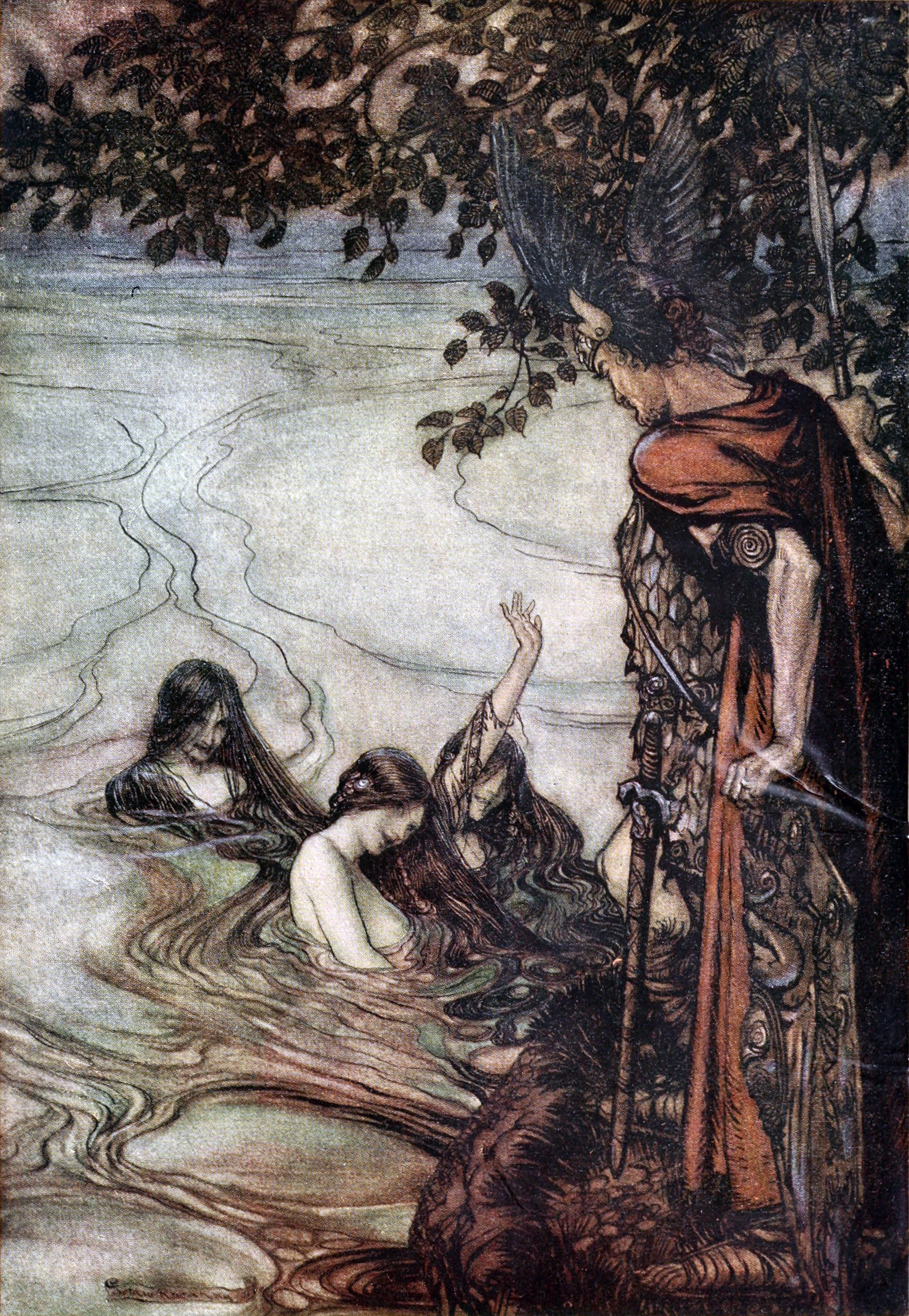
The Rhine maidens tease Siegfried. Illustration by Arthur Rackham from Siegfried and the Twilight of the Gods, English translation of Wagner's libretto for Götterdämmerung (1911).

William Morris, one of the founders of modern fantasy, became heavily involved with Iceland and its old literature between 1868 and 1876. In collaboration with the Icelander Eiríkur Magnússon (1833-1913), he translated and published Old Norse sagas, some of which had not been published in English before. Some of his sonnets were based on this matter, and addressed to the hero of Grettis saga. In the 1890s he produced translations of at least five Sagas of Icelanders, and the monumental Heimskringla. One of his most famous poems is The Story of Sigurd the Volsung and the Fall of the Niblungs, which Matthias Teichert describes as the most important English-language work based in the Nibelungen legend.

The most famous modern adaptation of Germanic heroic legend is Richard Wagner's operatic cycle The Ring of the Nibelung (Der Ring des Nibelungen. It was first performed in 1876, although an earlier version of Wagner's libretto was first published in 1853. The cycle consists of four operas: Das Rheingold, Die Walküre, Siegfried, and Götterdämmerung. Wagner's opera mixed elements of the Poetic Edda, the Völsunga saga, and the Nibelungenlied, as mediated by the theories, editions, and translations of the brothers Grimm, von der Hagen, Simrock, and other romantics. Klaus Böldl writes that Wagner's work has made a much broader circle of people aware of heroic legend and Norse mythology while at the same time suppressing knowledge of the original mythology. Outside of Germany, most reception of the Nibelungen material has taken place via Wagner.

The second most important German adaptation of the Germanic legend in late 19th century Germany was an epic poem in alliterative verse called Nibelunge, written by Carl Friedrich Wilhelm Jordan. The epic was published in two parts, Sigfridsage ("Legend of Sigfrid") in 1868, mostly based on the Nibelungen legend, and Hildebrands Heimkehr ("Hildebrand's Home-Coming") in 1874, mostly based on material about Dietrich von Bern. The epic was very popular, experiencing a dozen printings before the First World War, including an abbreviated edition for use in schools.

=== From World War 1 to World War 2 ===
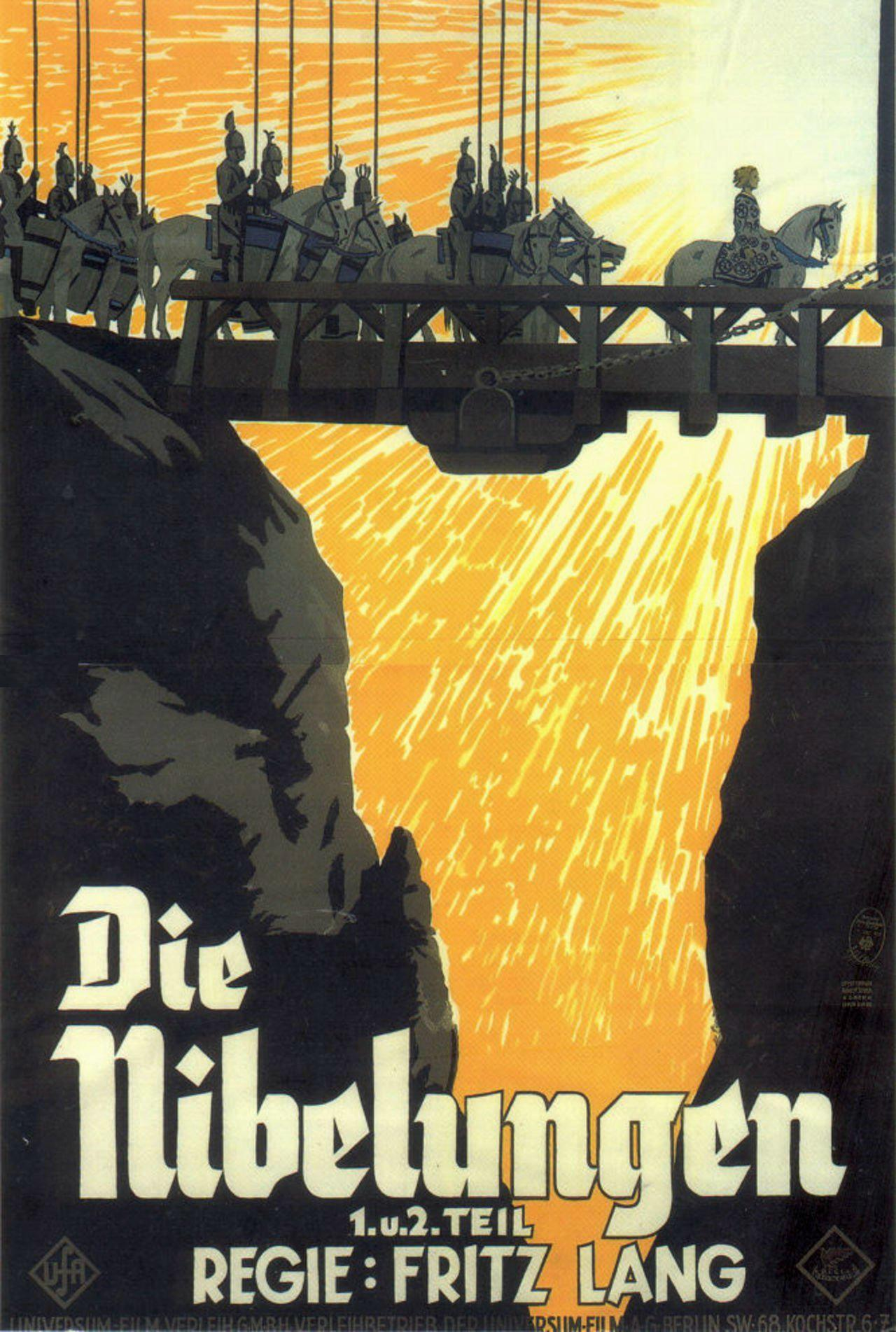
Film poster for Fritz Lang's two-part Die Nibelungen (1924/25).

The interwar period saw heroic legend enter the world of cinema in Fritz Lang's two part film Die Nibelungen (1924/1925). The film adapts the plot of the Nibelungenlied as a way to distance itself from Wagner's more heavy reliance on Scandinavian sources. The opening frames of the film dedicate it as inherent to the German people, implying that the film was intended as a form of national epic.

Already in the German Empire, the figure of Siegfried had become an identifying figure for German nationalism. In the First World War, the alliance between Germany and Austria-Hungary came to be described as possessing Nibelungentreue (Nibelungen loyalty), referring to the loyalty to the death between Hagen and the Burgundians. In the interwar years, the Nibelungenlied was heavily employed in anti-democratic propaganda following the defeat of Germany and Austria-Hungary: the epic supposedly showed that the German people were more well suited to a heroic, aristocratic form of life than democracy. The betrayal and murder of Siegfried was explicitly compared to the "stab in the back" that the German army had supposedly received. At the same time, Hagen and his willingness to sacrifice himself and fight to the death made him into a central figure in the reception of the poem. During the Second World War, Hermann Göring would explicitly use this aspect of the Nibelungenlied to celebrate the sacrifice of the German army at Stalingrad and compare the Soviets to Etzel's (Attila's) Asiatic Huns.

=== Post-World War 2 ===
As a reaction to the use of heroic legends by the Nazis, engagement with the Nibelungenlied and Nordic myth was eliminated from German school curricula and even became somewhat taboo after the fall of the Third Reich. Harald Reinl's two part film Die Nibelungen (1966/67) was one of the first commercially successful postwar adaptations, and takes much inspiration from the Nordic versions.

Perhaps the most influential post-WW2 work inspired by Germanic heroic legends was The Lord of the Rings, by J.R.R. Tolkien. It was published in three volumes over the course of a year from 29 July 1954 to 20 October 1955. In a 1941 letter to his son Michael, Tolkien had expressed his resentment at "that ruddy little ignoramus Adolf Hitler ... Ruining, perverting, misapplying, and making for ever accursed, that noble northern spirit, a supreme contribution to Europe, which I have ever loved, and tried to present in its true light."

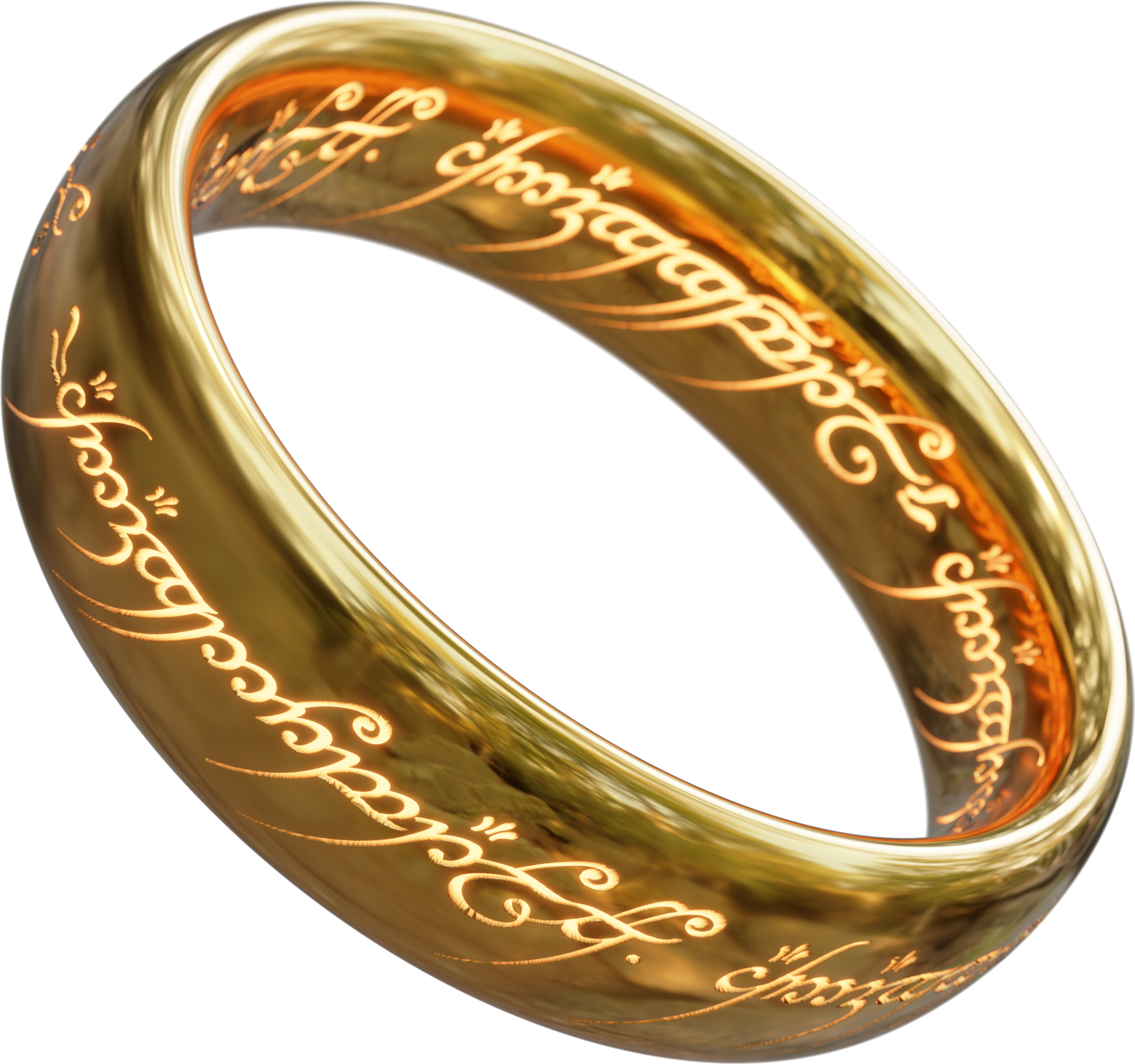
The one ring, based on Andvaranaut.

Tom Shippey calls Beowulf "the single work which influenced Tolkien most", but he was also inspired by other Germanic legends in many ways and he wished to imitate William Morris. Thus he wrote his own retelling of the Nibelung matter in The Legend of Sigurd and Gudrún. To name some of the influence it can be mentioned that in Hrólfs saga kraka, the hero Beowulf corresponds to the shapeshifting (bear-man) Bǫðvarr Bjarki, the latter of whom inspired the character Beorn, in The Hobbit. In the Norse accounts of the Nibelung matter, such as the Völsunga saga, there is a magical but cursed golden ring and a broken sword reforged, called Andvaranaut and Gram. They correspond broadly to the One Ring and the sword Narsil (reforged as Andúril), in The Lord of the Rings. In the Hervarar saga, there is the Hlöðskviða which provided a source for the horse-riding Rohirrim, in the form of the Goths, as well as the forest Mirkwood, a matter that also had inspired William Morris. Tolkien was influenced by the connection between the Goths and the Geats of Beowulf and the Völsunga saga, who he considered to be among the ancestors of the Anglo-Saxons. The Hervarar saga and Gestumblindi probably inspired the riddling contest in The Hobbit.

Adaptations of heroic legend continue to be produced. The trilogy Wodan's Children (1993-1996), by Diana L. Paxson, narrates the story of the Nibelungen from the perspectives of the female characters, and is one of the few English-language adaptations that is based directly on the medieval sources rather than Wagner's Ring cycle. Another recent adaptation is Stephan Grundy's Rhinegold (1994), which takes Wagner's ring as its basis but introduces many additional - mostly religious and mythical - elements from medieval sources. There have also been films, such as Dark Kingdom: The Dragon King (2004) based on the Nibelungen matter, a 2007 film adaptation of Beowulf, and TV-series, such as Vikings (2013 TV series) which is based on the heroic matter about Ragnar Lodbrok and his sons.

== Events ==
- Battle on the Ice of Lake Vänern
- Hjaðningavíg

== See also ==
- Lists of figures in Germanic heroic legend
- List of figures in Germanic heroic legend, A
- List of figures in Germanic heroic legend, B–C
- List of figures in Germanic heroic legend, D–E
- List of figures in Germanic heroic legend, F–G
- List of figures in Germanic heroic legend, H–He
- List of figures in Germanic heroic legend, Hi–Hy
- List of figures in Germanic heroic legend, I–O
- List of figures in Germanic heroic legend, P–S
- List of figures in Germanic heroic legend, T–Y
- List of named animals and plants in Germanic heroic legend
- List of named weapons, armour and treasures in Germanic heroic legend
