= Old High German literature =

German literature 750–1050

Old High German literature refers to literature written in Old High German, from the earliest texts in the 8th century to the middle of the 11th century.

== Scope ==
The term "literature" as it is used in connection with Old High German has a broader scope than for later periods in the history of German: it is not restricted to imaginative works but encompasses everything written in the language, including prayers and theological works as well as verse narratives. The surviving texts were written exclusively by clerics, in the main monks in a small number of monastic scriptoria, and serve almost entirely the purposes of the church in a region that was still being fully Christianized. Pre-Christian and non-clerical literary traditions are reflected in a small number of works, such as the Hildebrandslied and the charms, but otherwise there is little surviving evidence of the oral culture which must have been present outside clerical circles.

The earliest texts date from the second half of the 8th century: translation aids (glosses and glossaries) for those learning to read Latin and translations of Latin Christian texts (prayers, creeds, confessions) for use in missionary or pastoral work among the lay population. Translations and, later, adaptations of Latin Christian texts, continue throughout the period, and are seen in Otfrid's gospel harmony in the 9th century and the extensive works of Notker III in the early 11th century. After Notker, there is gap of some 40 years before evidence of a new tradition of biblical verse in a form of language now called Early Middle High German, which is followed by the flourishing secular literature of Middle High German.

== Language ==
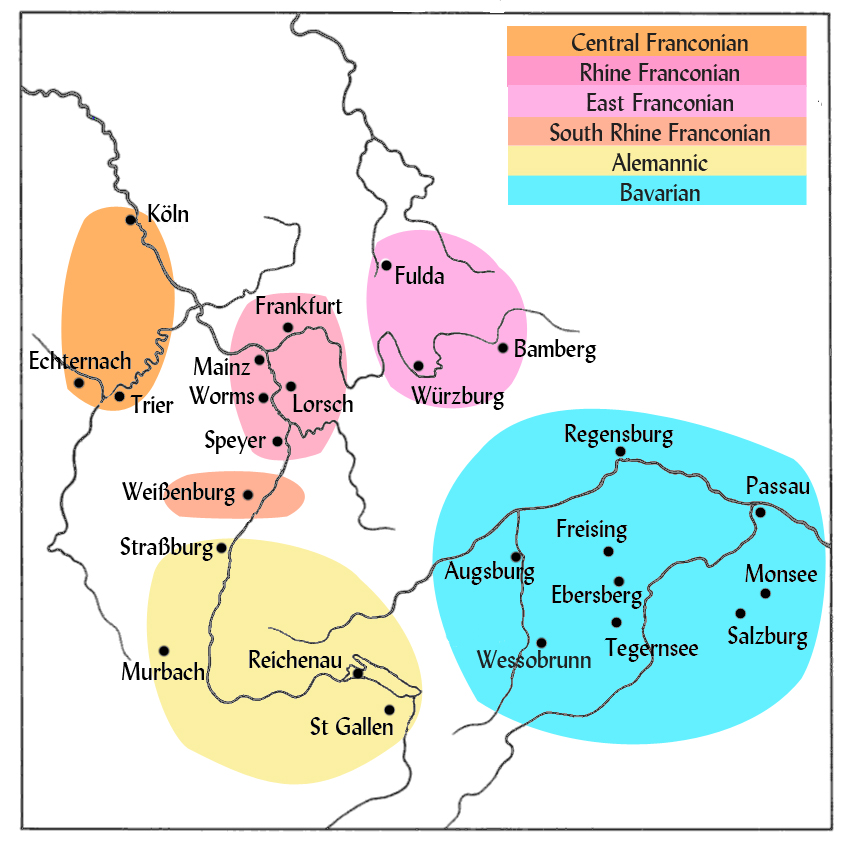
Map showing the main Old High German scriptoria and the areas of the Old High German "monastery dialects"

The Old High German period sees the first attempts to use the Latin alphabet for writing German, something which Otfrid of Weissenburg, writing c. 830, recognized as fraught with difficulty. As Murdoch explains, "Written down without prescriptive rules in more or less isolated monasteries, then, it is to be expected that Old High (and Old Low) German texts show a bewildering amount of linguistic variation." The result is that there is no standard Old High German — each text presents a particular dialect (or dialect mixture), and in the absence of contemporary evidence for dialect boundaries, they have been termed "monastery dialects" (German Klosterdialekte).

== Genres ==
=== Epic poetry ===
The most famous work in OHG is the Hildebrandslied, a short piece of Germanic alliterative heroic verse which besides the Muspilli is the sole survivor of what must have been a vast oral tradition.

=== Lyric poetry ===
Works include the short Ludwigslied, celebrating the victory of the Frankish army, led by Louis III of France, over Danish (Viking) raiders at the Battle of Saucourt-en-Vimeu on 3 August 881. There is also the incomplete Das Georgslied about the life of Saint George, and the Wessobrunn Prayer, a praise of Creation and a plea for strength to withstand sin.

=== Other literature ===
Works include the Evangelienbuch of Otfrid von Weissenburg, the Latin-German dictionary Abrogans, the magical Merseburg Charms and the Old High German translation of the theologian Tatian's Gospel harmony.

== Text collections ==
- Braune, Wilhelm; Ebbinghaus, Ernst A., eds. (1994). Althochdeutsches Lesebuch: Zusammengestellt und mit Wörterbuch versehen (17th ed.). Tübingen: Niemeyer. ISBN 3-484-10707-3.
  - Braune, Wilhelm, ed. (1921). Althochdeutsches Lesebuch: Zusammengestellt und mit Wörterbuch versehen (8th ed.). Halle: Niemeyer.
- Steinmeyer, Elias von, ed. (1916). Die kleineren althochdeutschen Sprachdenkmäler. Berlin: Weidmannsche Buchhandlung.
- Schlosser, Horst-Dieter, ed. (2004). Althochdeutsche Literatur: Mit altniederdeutschen Textbeispielen. Auswahl mit Übertragungen und Kommentar. Berlin: Erich Schmidt. ISBN 978-3503079032.(with German translations)
- Müller, Stephan, ed. (2018). Althochdeutsche Literatur. Eine kommentierte Anthologie. Stuttgart: Reclam. ISBN 978-3-15-018491-2.(with German translations)
- Murdoch, Brian O., ed. (2025). Old High German Poetry. An Anthology. London: Uppsala. ISBN 9781961361270.

== Sources ==
- Archibald, Linda (2004). "Otfrid of Weissenburg". In Murdoch, Brian (ed.). German Literature of the Early Middle Ages. New York, Woodbridge: Camden House. pp. 139–156. ISBN 1-57113-240-6.
- Bostock, J. Knight (1976). King, K. C.; McLintock, D. R. (eds.). A Handbook on Old High German Literature (2nd ed.). Oxford: Oxford University Press. ISBN 0-19-815392-9.
- de Boor, Helmut (1971). Geschichte der deutschen Literatur. Vol. Band I. Von Karl dem Großen bis zum Beginn der höfischen Literatur 770-1170. München: C.H.Beck. ISBN 3-406-00703-1.
- Gibbs, Marion; Johnson, Sidney, eds. (2002). Medieval German Literature: A Companion. New York, London: Routledge. ISBN 0-203-90660-8.
- Haubrichs, Wolfgang (1995). Die Anfänge: Versuche volkssprachlicher Schriftlichkeit im frühen Mittelalter (ca. 700-1050/60). Geschichte der deutschen Literatur von den Anfängen bis zum Beginn der Neuzeit. Vol. 1/1 (2nd ed.). Tübingen: Niemeyer. ISBN 978-3484107014.
- Murdoch, Murdoch, ed. (2004). German Literature of the Early Middle Ages. The Camden House History of German Literature. Vol. 2. New York, Woodbridge: Camden House. ISBN 1-57113-240-6.
- Sonderegger, Stefan (2003). Althochdeutsche Sprache und Literatur (3rd ed.). de Gruyter. ISBN 3-11-004559-1.
- Wells, C. J. (1987). German: A Linguistic History to 1945. Oxford: Oxford University Press. ISBN 0-19-815809-2.
- West, Jonathan (2004). "Late Old High German Prose". In Murdoch, Brian (ed.). German Literature of the Early Middle Ages. New York, Woodbridge: Camden House. pp. 227–245. ISBN 1-57113-240-6.
- Young, Christopher; Gloning, Thomas (2004). A History of the German Language through texts. London, New York: Routledge. ISBN 0-415-18331-6.
