= Heroic lay =

The heroic lay (German: Heldenlied) is a genre of Germanic epic poetry characteristic of the Migration Period and the Early Middle Ages. A lay is a short narrative poem of between 80 and 200 lines concerning a single heroic episode in the life of a warrior from Germanic legend. It is distinct from the heroic epic (Beowulf, Nibelungenlied) which combines a sequence of episodes into a longer narrative.

== Examples ==
- Old High German
  - The Hildebrandslied
- Old Norse
  - Atlakviða
  - Hamðismál
- Old English
  - The Finnesburg Fragment
