= Wolfgang Haubrichs =

German philologist and medievalist

- Born: 22 December 1942 (age 83); Saarbrücken, Germany

Academic background
- Education: Saarland University; University of Bonn
- Doctoral advisor: Hans Eggers

Academic work
- Discipline: Germanistics
- Institutions: Saarbrücken University
- Main interests: Old High German literature

Wolfgang Haubrichs (born 22 December 1942) is a German philologist and medievalist who specializes in the study of Old High German literature.

== Biography ==
Wolfgang Haubrichs was born in Saarbrücken, Germany on 22 December 1942. He is the son of lawyer Willi Haubrichs and Erika Schaap.

After graduating from high school in Saarbrücken, Haubrichs studied Germanistics, history and philosophy at Saarland University and the University of Bonn. Haubrichs earned his doctorate under the supervision of Hans Eggers in 1967 with a thesis on Otfrid of Weissenburg. He subsequently spent two years researching Old High German literature with funding from the Deutsche Forschungsgemeinschaft. During this time he was a research assistant of Hans Eggers at Saarland University, where he became Assistant Professor in the Department for Modern Linguistics and Literary Studies. He habilitated in 1975 with a dissertation on the Georgslied, and was subsequently appointed Professor of Medieval Studies and Old German Philology at the University of Saarbrücken. Haubrichs retired from this position in 2007, but continued to teach at Saarbrücken from 2011 to 2015.

== Selected works ==
- Ordo als Form. Strukturstudien zur Zahlenkomposition bei Otfrid von Weißenburg und in karolingischer Literatur, 1969
- Georgslied und Georgslegende im frühen Mittelalter: Text und Rekonstruktion, 1979
- Die Anfänge: Versuche volkssprachiger Schriftlichkeit im frühen Mittelalter (ca. 700–1050/60), 1995

== Sources ==
- Albrecht Greule, Hans-Walter Herrmann, Klaus Ridder, Andreas Schorr (eds.): Studien zu Literatur, Sprache und Geschichte in Europa. Wolfgang Haubrichs zum 65. Geburtstag gewidmet. Röhrig Universitätsverlag, St. Ingbert 2008. ISBN 3-86110-436-9.
