= Ludwigslied =

Old High German poem

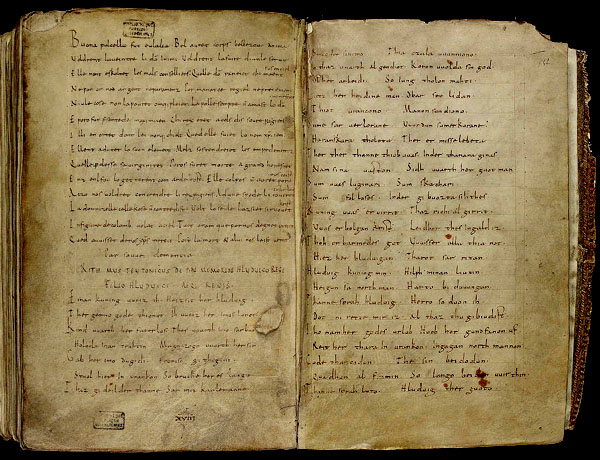
The first two pages of the Ludwigslied

The Ludwigslied (in English, Lay or Song of Ludwig) is an Old High German (OHG) poem of 59 rhyming couplets, celebrating the victory of the Frankish army, led by Louis III of France, over Danish (Viking) raiders at the Battle of Saucourt-en-Vimeu on 3 August 881.

The poem is thoroughly Christian in ethos. It presents the Viking raids as a punishment from God: He caused the Northmen to come across the sea to remind the Frankish people of their sins, and inspired Louis to ride to the aid of his people. Louis praises God both before and after the battle.

The poem is preserved over four pages in a single 9th-century manuscript formerly in the abbey of Saint-Amand, now in the Bibliothèque municipale, Valenciennes (Codex 150, f. 141v–143r). In the same manuscript, and written by the same scribe, is the Old French Sequence of Saint Eulalia.

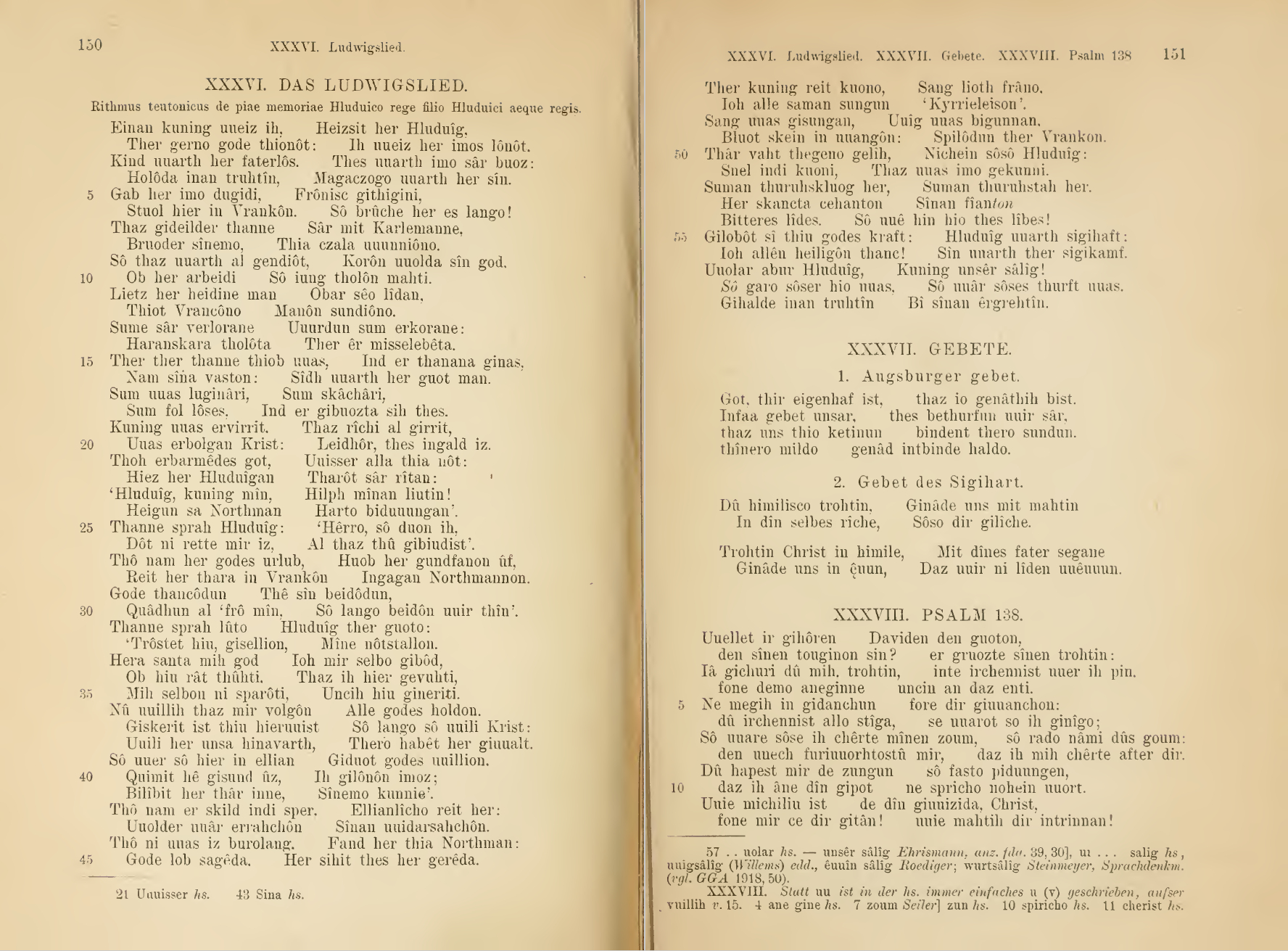
The Ludwigslied In Braune's Althochdeutsches Lesebuch, 8th edition, 1921

The poem speaks of Louis in the present tense: it opens, "I know a king called Ludwig who willingly serves God. I know he will reward him for it". Since Louis died in August the next year, the poem must have been written within a year of the battle. However, in the manuscript, the poem is headed by the Latin rubric Rithmus teutonicus de piae memoriae Hluduico rege filio Hluduici aeq; regis ("German song to the beloved memory of King Louis, son of Louis, also king"), which means it must be a copy of an earlier text.

== Synopsis ==
Dennis Green summarises the poem as follows:

After a general introductory formula in which the poet claims to know of King Ludwig (thereby implying the reliability of what he has to say) this king's prehistory is briefly sketched: the loss of his father at an early age, his adoption by God for his upbringing, his enthronement by divine authority as ruler of the Franks, and the sharing of his kingdom with his brother Karlmann. [ll. 1–8]

After these succinct eight lines the narrative action starts with God's testing of the young ruler in sending the Northmen across the sea to attack the Franks as a punishment for their sinfulness, who are thereby prompted to mend their ways by due penance. [ll. 9–18] The kingdom is in disarray not merely because of the Viking aggression, but more particularly because of Ludwig's absence, who is accordingly ordered by God to return and do battle. [ll. 19–26]

Raising his war-banner Ludwig returns to the Franks, who greet him with acclamation as one for whom they have long been waiting. Ludwig holds a council of war with his battle-companions, the powerful ones in his realm, and with the promise of reward encourages them to follow him into battle. [ll 27–41] He sets out, discovers the whereabouts of the enemy and, after a Christian battle-song, joins battle, which is described briefly, but in noticeably more stirring terms. Victory is won, not least thanks to Ludwig's inborn bravery. [ll. 42-54]

The poem closes with thanks to God and the saints for having granted Ludwig victory in battle, with praise of the king himself and with a prayer for God to preserve him in grace. [ll. 55–59]

== Genre ==
Although the poem is Christian in content, and the use of rhyme reflects Christian rather than pagan Germanic poetry, it is often assigned to the genre of Preislied, a song in praise of a warrior, of a type which is presumed to have been common in Germanic oral tradition and is well-attested in attested in Old Norse verse. Not all scholars agree, however. Other Carolingian-era Latin encomia are known for King Pippin of Italy (796) (Note: De Pippini regis Victoria Avarica) and the Emperor Louis II (871), (Note: Rythmus de captivitate Ludovici imperatoris) and the rhyming form may have been inspired by the same form in Otfrid of Weissenburg's Evangelienbuch (Gospel Book), finished before 871.

== Language and authorship ==
There is a consensus that the OHG dialect of the Ludwigslied is Rhine Franconian. However, this was a Rhineland dialect from the area around Mainz in East Francia, remote from St Amand and Ludwig's kingdom. Thus there is an apparent inconsistency between the language of the text on the one hand and the origin of the manuscript and the event described on the other.

However, the language also shows some features which derive from the German dialects closest to Saucourt, Central Franconian and Low Franconian. Additionally, the prothetic h before initial vowels (e.g. heigun (l.24) for correct eigun, "have") indicates interference from the Romance dialect. The fact that the scribe was bilingual in French and German also locates the text away from the Rhine Franconian area.

Taken together, this evidence suggests that the text was written in an area close to the linguistic border between Romance and Germanic. Bischoff's localising of the script to an unidentified known scriptorium Lower Lotharingia on the left bank of the Rhine strengthens this conclusion.

However, it is impossible to tell on purely linguistic grounds whether these local indications belong to the original text or arose only in local copying. A number of solutions have been suggested:

- the original text was written in East Francia and the other dialect features were introduced when the text was copied in West Francia by a locally educated, bilingual scribe;
- it was composed in West Francia by someone who either came from East Francia or had been educated there, but his language was affected by features from the local Frankish dialects and the Romance idiom of the area.
- while the general population of the area round Saucourt and St Amand spoke the local Romance dialect (Picard-Walloon), in court circles there was widespread French-German bilingualism amongst both senior clergy and aristocracy. Many nobles had connections with East Francia, and a local Frankish dialect, often referred to as West Frankish (Westfränkisch), may have been spoken at Ludwig's court.

The first of these options seems implausible: God gives Ludwig "a throne here in Francia" (Stuol hier in Vrankōn, l. 6), which only makes sense from a Western perspective. The personal commitment of the author to Ludwig ("I know a king", Einan kuning uueiz ih, l. 1) also indicates that he was a close to Ludwig's court rather than an outsider.

== Manuscript ==
=== Description ===
The Ludwigslied is preserved over four pages in a single 9th-century manuscript formerly in the monastery of Saint-Amand, now in the Bibliothèque Municipale, Valenciennes (Codex 150, fol. 141v-143r).

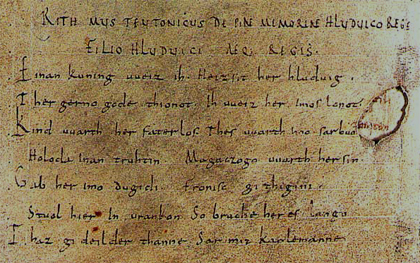
Fol. 141v, bottom
(ll. 1–7).

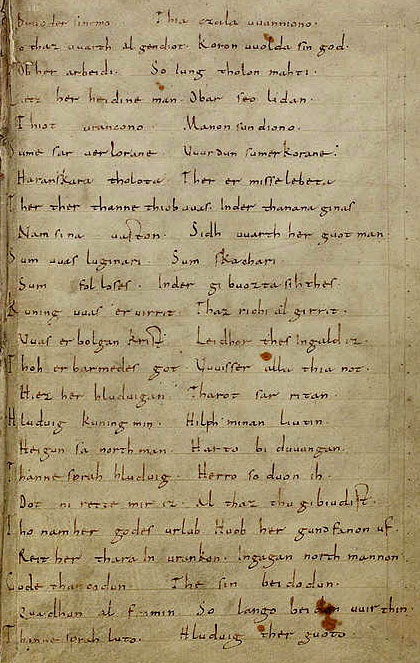
Fol. 142r
(ll. 8–31).

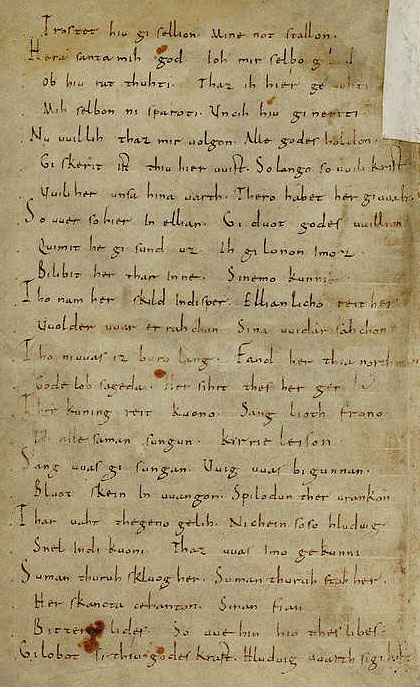
Fol. 142v
(ll. 32–55).

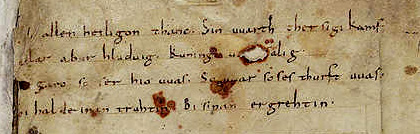
Fol. 143r, top,
(ll. 56–59).

The codex itself dates from the early 9th century and originally contained only works by Gregory of Nazianzus in the Latin translation by Tyrannius Rufinus (fol. 1v-140r). The blank leaves at the end of the codex contain later additions in four different hands:

- Dominus celi rex et conditor, a sequence in Latin (fol. 140v to 141r)
- Cantica uirginis eulalie, a 14-line sequence about Saint Eulalia in Latin (fol. 141r)
- the Sequence of Saint Eulalia in Old French (fol. 141v)
- the Ludwigslied (fol. 141v to 143r)
- Uis fidei tanta est quae germine prodit amoris, 15 couplets in Latin (fol. 143r to 143v).

The Sequence of Saint Eulalia and the Ludwigslied are written in the same hand. A Carolingian minuscule with rustic capitals for the rubric and first letter of each line, it differs from the other hands in the manuscript. The text of the Ludwigslied is presumed to be a copy made after August 882 as the poem describes a living king, while the rubric refers to Ludwig as being "of blessed memory" (Latin: piae memoriae).

=== Sources ===
St Amand's ownership of the codex is indicated by the note liber sancti amandi ("St Amand's book") on the verso of the final folio (143), but this dates from the twelfth century, and the long-held view that the text of the Ludwigslied was written in St Amand itself now seems unlikely to be correct. The hand of the Sequence of Saint Eulalia and the Ludwigslied does not show the characteristics of the scriptorium of St Amand, and the limp binding is untypical of the library.

The MS was unlikely to have been at St Amand before 883, when the abbey and its library were destroyed by Viking raiders. The monks returned after a few years and the library's holdings were rebuilt from 886 onwards under Abbot Hucbald. Hucbald himself provided 18 volumes, and further volumes seem to have been "scrounged" from around the region. MS 150 is likely to have been among these new accessions.

=== Rediscovery ===
In 1672 the manuscript was discovered in St Amand by the Benedictine monk Jean Mabillon, who commissioned a transcription, though, unfamiliar with Old High German, he was unable to appreciate its shortcomings (Willems later counted 125 errors). He forwarded this to the Strassburg jurist and antiquarian Johann Schilter. When he asked for a better transcription, the manuscript could no longer be found, presumably having gone astray when the abbey was hit by an earthquake in 1692. Schilter published the transcription in 1696 with a Latin translation, "together with an expression of his misgivings". (Mabillon published his own version in 1706.) Subsequent editions by Herder (1779), Bodmer (1780), and Lachmann (1825) were necessarily based on Mabillon's text, though attempts were made to identify and correct likely errors.

In 1837 Hoffman von Fallersleben set out to trace the fate of the manuscript, which he discovered, uncatalogued, in the Valenciennes library. He immediately made and published a new transcription, along with the first transcription of the Sequence of Saint Eulalia, with a commentary by Jan Frans Willems. It was Jacob Grimm who in 1856 gave it the title of Ludwigslied.

== Excerpt ==
The first four lines of the poem, with an English translation.

Old High German

Einan kuning uueiz ih, || Heizsit her Hluduig,
Ther gerno gode thionot: || Ih uueiz her imos lonot.
Kind uuarth her faterlos, || Thes uuarth imo sar buoz:
Holoda inan truhtin, || Magaczogo uuarth her sin.

Translation:
English translation

I know a king — his name is Hluduig —
who serves God zealously: I know He rewards him for it.
As a young man he became fatherless. This was at once made good to him:
The Lord took him and became his guardian.

== Editions ==
- Schilter, J (1696). Ἐπινίκιον. Rhythmo teutonico Ludovico regi acclamatum, cum Nortmannos an. DCCCLXXXIII. vicisset. Strassburg: Johann Reinhold Dulssecker.
- Mabillon, Jean (1706). Annales ordinis S. Benedicti occidentalium monachorum patriarchae... Vol. III. Paris: Charles Robustel. pp. 684–686.
- Hoffmann von Fallersleben, August Heinrich; Willems, J F (1837). Elnonensia. Monuments des langues romane et tudesque dans le IXe siècle, contenus dans un manuscrit de l'Abbaye de St.-Amand... Ghent: Gyselynck.
- von Steinmeyer, Emil Elias, ed. (1916). "XVI. Das Ludwigslied". Die kleineren althochdeutschen Sprachdenkmäler. Berlin: Weidmannsche Buchhandlung. pp. 85–88.
- Braune, Wilhelm; Ebbinghaus, Ernst A., eds. (1994). "XXXVI. Das Ludwigslied". Althochdeutsches Lesebuch (17th ed.). Tübingen: Niemeyer. pp. 84–85. doi:10.1515/9783110911824.136b. ISBN 3-484-10707-3. The standard edition of the text.

== Bibliography ==
- Bauschke, Ricarda (2006). "Die gemeinsame Überlieferung von 'Ludwigslied' und 'Eulalia-Sequenz'". In Lutz, E C; Haubrichs, W; Ridder, K (eds.). Text und Text in lateinischer und volkssprachiger Überlieferung des Mittelalters. Wolfram Studien. Vol. XIX. Berlin: Erich Schmidt. pp. 209–232. ISBN 978-3-503-07994-0.
- Bischoff, Bernhard (1971). "Paläographische Fragen deutscher Denkmäler der Karolingerzeit". Frühmittelalterliche Studien. 5 (1): 101–134. doi:10.1515/9783110242058.101.
- Bostock, J. Knight; King, K. C.; McLintock, D. R. (1976). A Handbook on Old High German Literature (2nd ed.). Oxford: The Clarendon Press. pp. 235–248. ISBN 0-19-815392-9. Includes a translation into English. Limited preview at Google Books
- Chambers, W W (1946). "Rhythmus Teutonicus ou Ludwigslied? by Paul Lefrancq". Modern Language Review. 41 (4): 447–448. doi:10.2307/3716756. JSTOR 3716756. (Review)
- Fischer, Hanns, ed. (1966). "Ludwigslied". Schrifttafeln zum althochdeutschen Lesebuch. Tübingen: Max Niemeyer. p. 25*. doi:10.1515/9783110952018.49a. ISBN 978-3-11-095201-8.
- Fouracre, Paul (1985). "The Context of the Old High German Ludwigslied". Medium Aevum. 54 (q): 87–103. doi:10.2307/43628867. JSTOR 43628867.
- ———— (1989). "Using the Background to the Ludwigslied: Some Methodological Problems". In Flood, John L; Yeandle, David N (eds.). "'Mit regulu bithuungan'": Neue Arbeiten zur althochdeutschen Poesie und Sprache. Göppingen: Kümmerle. pp. 80–93. ISBN 3-87452-737-9.
- Fought, John (1979). "The 'Medieval Sibilants' of the Eulalia–Ludwigslied Manuscript and Their Development in Early Old French". Language. 55 (4): 842–58. doi:10.2307/412747. JSTOR 412747.
- Freytag W (1985). "Ludwigslied". In Ruh K, Keil G, Schröder W (eds.). Die deutsche Literatur des Mittelalters. Verfasserlexikon. Vol. 5. Berlin, New York: Walter De Gruyter. cols. 1036–1039. ISBN 978-3-11-022248-7.
- Green, Dennis H. (2002). "The "Ludwigslied" and the Battle of Saucourt". In Jesch, Judith (ed.). The Scandinavians from the Vendel period to the tenth century. Cambridge: Boydell. pp. 281–302. ISBN 9780851158679.
- Grimm, Jacob (1856). "Über das Ludwigslied". Germania. 1: 233–235.
- Groseclose, J Sidney; Murdoch, Brian O (1976). "Ludwigslied". Die althochdeutschen poetischen Denkmäler. Stuttgart: Metzler. pp. 67–77. ISBN 3-476-10140-1.
- Handschriftencensus (2024). "Handschriftenbeschreibung 7591". Handschriftencensus.
- Harvey, Ruth (1945). "The Provenance of the Old High German Ludwigslied". Medium Aevum. 14: 1–20. doi:10.2307/43626303. JSTOR 43626303.
- Haubrichs, Wolfgang (1995). "Das Schlacht- und Fürstenpreislied". Die Anfänge: Versuche volkssprachlicher Schriftlichkeit im frühen Mittelalter (ca. 700-1050/60). Geschichte der deutschen Literatur von den Anfängen bis zum Beginn der Neuzeit. Vol. 1/1 (2nd ed.). Tübingen: Niemeyer. pp. 137–146. ISBN 978-3484107014.
- ———— (2023). "Rustica Romana lingua und Theotisca lingua – Frühmittelalterliche Mehrsprachigkeit im Raum von Rhein, Maas und Mosel". In Franceschini, Rita; Hüning, Matthias; Maitz, Péter (eds.). Historische Mehrsprachigkeit: Europäische Perspektiven. Berlin, Boston: De Gruyter. pp. 179–206. doi:10.1515/9783111338668-009. ISBN 9783111338668.
- Hellgardt, Ernst (1996). "Zur Mehrsprachigkeit im Karolingerreich: Bemerkungen aus Anlaß von Rosamond McKittericks Buch "The Carolingians and the written word"". Beiträge zur Geschichte der deutschen Sprache und Literatur. 1996 (118): 1–48. doi:10.1515/bgsl.1996.1996.118.1.
- Herweg, Matthias (2013). "Ludwigslied". In Bergmann, Rolf (ed.). Althochdeutsche und altsächsische Literatur. Berlin, Boston: De Gruyter. pp. 241–252. ISBN 978-3-11-024549-3.
- Horváth, Iván (2014). "When Literature Itself Was Bilingual: A Rule of Vernacular Insertions" (PDF). Ars Metrica (11).
- Marold, Edith (2001). "Preislied". In Beck, Heinrich; Geuenich, Dieter; Steuer, Heiko (eds.). Reallexikon der Germanischen Altertumskunde. Vol. 23. Berlin: De Gruyter. pp. 398–408. ISBN 3-11-017163-5.
- Maurer, Friedrich (1957). "Hildebrandslied und Ludwigslied. Die altdeutschen Zeugen der hohen Gattungen der Wanderzeit". Der Deutschunterricht. 9: 5–15. Reprinted in: Maurer, Friedrich (1963). Dichtung und Sprache des Mittelalters, Gesammelte Aufsätze. Bern: Francke. pp. 157–163.
- McKitterick, Rosamond (2008). The Carolingians and the Written Word. Cambridge: Cambridge University Press. pp. 232–235. ISBN 978-0521315654.
- Metzner, Ernst Erich (1997). "Neue Annäherungen an das Ludwigslied von 881". In Bovenschen, Silvia; et al. (eds.). Der fremdgewordene Text. Berlin, New York: de Gruyter. pp. 174–201. ISBN 3110149400.
- Metzner, Ernst E (2001). "Ludwigslied". In Beck, Heinrich; Geuenich, Dieter; Steuer, Heiko (eds.). Reallexikon der Germanischen Altertumskunde. Vol. 19. Berlin: De Gruyter. pp. 12–17. ISBN 3-11-017163-5.
- Murdoch, Brian (1977). "Saucourt and the Ludwigslied: Some Observations on Medieval Historical Poetry". Revue belge de Philologie et d'Histoire. 55 (3): 841–67. doi:10.3406/rbph.1977.3161.
- ———— (2004). "Heroic Verse". In Murdoch, Brian (ed.). German Literature of the Early Middle Ages. Camden House History of German Literature. Vol. 2. Rochester, NY; Woodbridge: Boydell & Brewer. pp. 121–138. ISBN 1-57113-240-6.
- Platelle, Henri (1961). "Les effets des raids scandinaves à Saint-Amand (881, 883)". Revue du Nord. 43 (169): 129.
- Rossi, Albert Louis (1986). Vernacular Authority in the Late Ninth Century: Bilingual Juxtaposition in MS 150, Valenciennes (Eulalia, Ludwigslied, Gallo-Romance, Old High German) (PhD thesis). Princeton University.
- Schneider, Jens (2003). "Les Northmanni en Francie occidentale au IXe siècle. Le chant de Louis". Annales de Normandie. 53 (4): 291–315. doi:10.3406/annor.2003.1453.
- Schützeichel, Rudolf (1966–1967). "Das Ludwigslied und die Erforschung des Westfränkischen". Rheinische Vierteljahrsblätter. 31: 291–306.
- Schwarz, Werner (1947). "The "Ludwigslied", a Ninth-Century Poem". Modern Language Review. 42 (2): 467–473. doi:10.2307/3716800. JSTOR 3716800.
- Wehrli, Max (1969). "Gattungsgeschichtliche Betrachtungen zum Ludwigslied". Formen mittelalterlicher Erzählung. Zürich, Freiburg: Atlantis. pp. 73–86.
- Wehrli, Max (1984). "Das "Ludwigslied"". Geschichte der deutschen Literatur vom frühen Mittelalter bis zum Ende des 16. Jahrhundert (2nd ed.). Stuttgart: Reclam. pp. 91–94. ISBN 3150102944.
- Wolf, Alois. "Medieval Heroic Traditions and Their Transitions from Orality to Literacy". In Vox Intexta: Orality and Textuality in the Middle Ages, ed. A. N. Doane and C. B. Pasternack, 67–88. Madison: University of Wisconsin Press, 1991. Limited preview at Google Books
- Yeandle, David N (1989). "The Ludwigslied: King, Church and Context". In Flood, John L; Yeandle, David N (eds.). "'Mit regulu bithuungan'": Neue Arbeiten zur althochdeutschen Poesie und Sprache. Göppingen: Kümmerle. pp. 18–79. ISBN 3-87452-737-9.
- Young, Christopher; Gloning, Thomas (2004). A History of the German Language through texts. London, New York: Routledge. pp. 77–85. ISBN 0-415-18331-6.
