= List of people, clan, and place names in Germanic heroic legend =

Names only appearing in Widsith with no further information are excluded from the list.

== A–C ==
Modernized name	Names in medieval languages	Name meaning and/or identification	Notes
Amals	Middle High German: Amelunge, Old Norse: Aumlungar, Old English: Amulinga in Alfred the Great's translation of Boethius.	The Gothic Amal dynasty, to which Theodoric the Great and Ermanaric belonged. Name probably derived from Gothic *amals (bravery, vigor). The medieval versions add the suffix -ung indicating "belonging to". Amelungenland (ON Amlungaland) refers to Dietrich's kingdom in northern Italy (see also Lombardy).	In Middle High German epic, used for Dietrich von Bern's relatives. This name is used exclusively and instead of the term "Goth". In Dietrichs Flucht and Rabenschlacht, Dietrich's followers are split between Amelungs and Wolfings, whereas in the Nibelungenlied, all his followers are Amelungs. The Þiðreks saga confuses Amlungaland with the land of the Harlungen, who in German sources are associated with Breisach and the south Rhine.
Amoþingas		See Hinnøya	
Ænenas	Old English: Ǣnenas	A people mentioned in Widsith that can not be identified. Perhaps, they are identical to the Nuithones of Tacitus, if the name is emended to Unithones.	
Angles	Old English: Engle, Old High German: Angil-, Old Norse: Englar	From PGmc *Angilaz, itself from the name of the Anglia peninsula, where they settled. Related to PGmc *angōn ("curve; neck") and *angulaz ("hook, tip").	
Agnafit	Old Norse: Agnafit	Located at the outflow of Mälaren where modern Stockholm is situated. In Ynglinga saga, it is reported that it got its name "Agne's meadow" from the story when the legendary Swedish king Agne's bride hanged him from a tree there, in his golden torc.	Ynglinga saga, Hervarar saga, Ásmundar saga kappabana, Orvar-Odd's saga and in the Saga of Olaf Haraldsson.
Álfheimr (region)	Old Norse: Álfheimr	In the Norse legendary sagas, the name of an area corresponding to Bohuslän, in Sweden.	
Andvari Falls, Waterfall of Andvari	Old Norse: Andvarafors	The waterfalls of the dwarf Andvari, who swam there in the form of a pike and owned the hoard that later became known as the Rhinegold. Loki later caught him and extorted from him all the gold, including the cursed ring Andvaranaut.	
Aquitaine	Latin: Aquitania, Middle High German: Wasconje lant	Region in modern western France.	The people of Walter of Aquitaine in the Waltharius, Walter's association with Aquitaine (MHG Wasconenlant, Wasconje lant, "Basque Land") and his encounter with Gunther and Hagen in the Vosges (MHG Waskenwalt) may have reinforced each other. The smith Hertrich dwells there in Biterolf und Dietleib.
Arastein	Old Norse: Arastein	The name means "eagle cliff".	After having killed Hunding's sons and just before meeting Sigrun in Helgakvíða Hundingsbana I, Helgi Hundingsbani rests at Arastein.
Arheimar	Old Norse: Árheimar	The "river home" on the Dniepr was the capital of the Goths in Hervarar saga. It has been identified with Kamjans'ke Horodyšče, near Kamianka-Dniprovska which has provided archaeological finds to support it. Kiev has also been proposed but does not fit archaeologically or historically.	
Baiuvarii (Bavarians)	Middle High German: Beier		In the Nibelungenlied, the Bavarians have a reputation for robbery and boastfulness. They attack the Burgundians as they travel to the Huns in Hungary.
Banings	Old English: Bāningas	A people mentioned in Widsith and perhaps located in central Germany.	It may be connected with the district name Bainab that appears Origo Gentis Langobardorum, and the people Βαινοχαῖμαι that Ptolemy located near the Elbe.
Bechelaren	Middle High German: Bechelâren, Old Norse: Bakalar	Pöchlarn in modern Austria. The Þiðreks saga places it on the Rhine rather than on the Danube.	The capital of the Hunnish march ruled by Rüdiger.
Bern	Middle High German: Berne, Old Norse: Bern	Verona, Italy. The change of v to b could show Romance or Gothic influence, while the remainder of the development of Verona to MHG Berne is regular. This was the first city south of the Alps on the usual route from Germany.	Home of Dietrich von Bern. The term Bernære (Berner/Veronan) is commonly used to refer to Dietrich in medieval German epic. In Dietrichs Flucht, Dietrich von Bern's father Dietmar founds Bern, whereas in the Heldenbuch-Prosa the city is constructed by Dietrich's real father, the demon Machmet (Mohammad), in three nights.
Bohemians (Czechs)	Middle High German: Bêheim	A Slavic people living in the modern Czech Republic.	Attila and Dietrich von Bern are challenged by Wenezlan, the ruler of the Bohemians, in Dietrich und Wenezlan. Bohemians also fight against Attila in Biterolf und Dietleib, in which they are said to fight with flails.
Bolmsö	Old Norse: Bólm	The home of the sons of Arngrímr, the twelve berserkers in the Samsey poetry. The island is situated in lake Bolmen in the Finnveden region of Götaland. The name is from the name of the lake, Bolmen, which is from Old East Norse *bolmber meaning "big one". Schütte argued that Angelstad at the lake was named after Angantyr, which is accepted by Pritsak.	This is according to the more original R version of Hervarar saga. The considerably more altered H and U versions place it in Hålogaland in Norway. Gesta danorum places the berserkers in Sweden.
Bragalund	Old Norse: Bragalundr	The name means "grove where great deeds are performed" and appears in the heroic poem Helgakvíða Hundingsbana II.	A fictive location where the hero killed bears.
Brálund	Old Norse: Brálundr	The element brá is the same as that of the real location Brávellir but Brálundr may have been created for alliterative purposes in the poems Helgakvíða Hundingsbana I and Helgakvíða Hundingsbana II.	The location where the hero of the poems was born to Sigmund and Borghild.
Brand Isle	Old Norse: Brandey	The word brandr may refer to "a stock in the front of a ship" and appears in the heroic poem Helgakvíða Hundingsbana I, it has been suggested to correspond to the island Brännholmen in Östergötland.	A location where the hero has assembled his fleet.
Brávellir, Bråviken	Old Norse: Brávellir, Old Norse: Brávík	The name Brávellir refers the plains (vellir, "wolds") near Norrköping in Östergötland, and Bråviken to the inlet (-viken) north-east of the city. The first element is the Old East Norse adjective *brar ("shining"), but the name of the inlet may originally have been *Brae meaning "the shining one" or the fjard to which the river *Bra (Motala ström) runs.	The location of the massive Battle of Brávellir between Danish king Harald Wartooth and Swedish king Sigurd Ring, the father of Ragnar Lodbrok. It was also the home of Sinfjötli in Helgakviða Hundingsbana I, stanza 42 (taunted for having had unnatural relations with Sigurd's horse Grani there).
Breisach	Middle High German: Brîsâch, Old Norse: Trelinnborg (?)	Breisach on the Rhine.	In German tradition, the home of the Harlungen. In the Þiðreks saga, Trelinnborg is one of three cities associated with the Harlungen and is usually identified with Breisach.
Brittany (Bertangaland)	Old Norse: Bertangaland	A Celtic-speaking region in modern Western France. The normal name for Brittany in Old Norse was minni Bretland ("lesser Britain") or syðri Bretland ("southern Britain"), and Bretons were called - the form in the Þiðreks saga is based on a genitive plural of a name *Bert, which, however, is not used in the saga. The name could have been altered by influence of and confusion with Bardengau, a region in Northern Germany.	In the Þiðreks saga, the kingdom of King Arthur, but it is seized by king Isung after Arthur's death. Dietrich von Bern faces twelve champions there, including Siegfried/Sigurd. Dietleib von Steier is killed there by the forces of Hertnið.
Brondings	Old English: Brondingas	The people of Breca and his father Beanstan.	The name is maybe from brond ("sword") or from ON brandr, which means "prow of a ship".
Black Forest	Old Norse: Svávaskógr	The Norse name means "Swabian Forest" and could also refer to the Swabian Jura around Switzerland.	In the Þiðreks saga, Sigurd/Siegfried's mother gives birth to the hero and dies in the "Swabian Forest". Sigurd/Siegfried is subsequently raised by a hind in the forest.
Bruna Bay	Old Norse: Brunavágar	Wessén translates the name as "bay of breaking waves" (the word allbruna appears in the Gotland dialect of Old Norse), while Bugge translates it as the "bay of burning and pillaging". It appears in the heroic poem Helgakvíða Hundingsbana II.	A fictive location where the hero rests with his fleet.
Burgundians	Old English: Burgendas, Middle High German: Burgonde, Old Norse: Burgundar	The Germanic tribe of the Burgundians, who settled first on the Rhine and then in Burgundy. Name possibly means "those who dwell in high places/forts" from PGmc *burg-. Their origins have been connected to Borgund, in Norway, and to the island of Bornholm (ON: Borgundarholmr, OE: Burgendaland).	The historical Burgundian kings Gunther/Gunnarr, Giselher, and Gernot are described as Burgundians in the German tradition. Widsith associated Gunther (Guðhere) with the Burgundians, and Gunnarr is described as "friend of the Burgundians" (Old Norse: vin Borgunda) in Atlakviða, but otherwise in ON, he and his brothers are called Niflungar. In Middle High German tradition, their kingdom is centered around Worms on the Rhine. In the Waltharius, the capital is Châlons; however, here Gunther and his brothers are Franks and Hildigund and her father Hericus are Burgundians.
Busiltjorn	Old Norse: Busiltjǫrn	Busi is a variant of buði and means "swollen", cf. busilkinna ("woman with swollen cheeks"), while tjǫrn means "lake".	When Sigurd chooses a horse, he drives a herd through the river Busiltjorn and the only horse that does not swim back is Grani.
Carpathians	Old Norse: Harvaða fjöllum	Most scholars have long agreed that Hervarar saga preserves an ancient Germanic form of the name "Carpathians" as Harvað-, from PGmc *χarfaþ-, from an earlier karpat, as it shows that it has been worked on by Grimm's law.	Mentioned in the Gothic legends in Hervarar saga.
Chatti, Chattuarii,	Old English: Hetware, Old English: Hætwerum	A people mentioned in both Beowulf (line 2363) in connection with Hygelac's historic raid into Frisia, and in Widsith (line 33), where they have a ruler named Hūn. The name derives from hæt ("hat") meaning "helmet" and -ware ("inhabitants"), so it means "helmet bearers" or "helmet dwellers". They were a "people on the lower Rhine" who were Frankish or allied with the Franks. They were raid's victims but also the ones who defeated the Geats.	They are also mentioned in connection with Hygelac's raid by Liber Historiæ Francorum where they are called Attoarii.
Cumans	Middle High German: Valwen	A nomadic Turkic people also known as the Polovtsi; Valwen is the German form of this second name.	The Cumans appear as archers in Attila's army in Biterolf und Dietleib and also in the minstrel epic König Rother.

== D–G ==
Modernized name	Names in medieval languages	Name meaning and/or identification	Notes
Daglings	Dǫglingar	In the Ynglinga saga, Dag the Great is the father of Dageiðr, who together with Alaric, the king of Sweden, had the son Alf^{1}. Dag's descendants were called the Daglings (dǫglingar).	In Snorri's source Ynglingatal 8, dǫglingar ("descendant of Dag") appears, but Elias Wessén comments that this probably refers to Dag the Wise an earlier king of Sweden, and Snorri's inclusion of a second king named Dag appears unmotivated. An ancestral Dag also appears in sources such as Hversu Noregr byggðist, Hervarar saga, Orvar-Odd's saga, and Ragnarssona þáttr.
Dean	Old English: Dēan	A people mentioned in Widsith, line 63, and who lived somewhere in southern Scandinavia. It appears to be the same name as the Daukíones reported by Ptolemy and Ptolemy's form is derived from PGmc *Dauhjaniz while Widsith's form is from the non-hypocoristic form *Dauhaniz, both from same PGmc base *dauh as the verb *dugan ("to be worth").	It has also been suggested that Dēanum should be emended to Denum ("Danes").
Danes	Old Norse: danir, Old English: Dene, Middle High German: Tenen	From PGmc *đaniz, of uncertain origin. Some suggestions are "valley inhabitants", "inhabitants of swampy borderlands in the south", and "forest people" (cf. modern German Tanne, pine tree). They are not mentioned before the 6th c.	In several medieval chronicles, a Danish tradition is preserved that an eponymous king Dan had ruled over Zealand, Møn, Falster and Lolland, a kingdom called Vihtesleth. Most Middle High German heroic poems include Danish heroes, and in the Nibelungenlied a distinction seems to be made between Tenenmark (a march of the Holy Roman Empire between the rivers Schlei and Eider inhabited by Danes) and Tenenlant (a separate kingdom).
Drecanflis	Old Norse: Drecanflis	Probably Drachenfels, a mountain on the Rhine that had a castle in the Middle Ages. The name is from MHG trache (dragon) and felse ("rock, cliff, stronghold on a mountain"); the form in the Þiðreks saga may show Middle Low German influence.	The Þiðreks saga locates the giant Ecke here. The name only occurs in the Þiðreks saga, but other indications suggest that the Ecke legend was placed on the Rhine in German tradition.
Dunheiðr	Old Norse: Dúnheiðr	Most scholars of Germanic languages have derived the name from *Dūnabisheiðr, the "Danube heath" or the "Danube plain". However, several historians have identified Dún with the Donets river, which was called Don in the Middle Ages.	Hervarar saga
Earnaness	Old English: Earnanæs	Earn means "eagle", and næs(s) means "headland, bluff". It is one of several legendary place names that have a fictive quality with an element from the natural world, and like several constructed with the name of an animal in the genitive + a common word for a natural feature, and it seems to be a poetic invention. Several locations with that name exist in southern Scandinavia, such as Årnäs in Västergötland, which is commonly believed to correspond to the kingdom of the Geats, and one on the coast near Kungsbacka ("king's hill"), where the Geatish royal seat has been conjectured to have been located.	The location, where Beowulf fights the dragon, and where their dead bodies are laid out.
East-Thuringians	Old English: Ēastþyringas	A people mentioned in Widsith, line 86, and identical to the Thuringians, below. The name may be due to their eastern location east of the Elbe.	The use of east may be to distinguish them from the Thoringi in the Netherlands.
Egyptians	Old English: Ēgypte	A people mentioned in Widsith, line 83.	
Eowan	Old English: Eowan	A people mentioned in Widsith, line 27, who were the inhabitants Öland.	
Exsyrings	Old English: Exsyringas	A people mentioned in Widsith, line 82, who were apparently the Assyrians.	
Etzelnburg	Middle High German: Etzelnburc	City of Etzel (Attila). Either Esztergom or Buda in Hungary.	The name of Etzel's capital in the Middle High German tradition.
Falstr scogr	Old Norse: Falstr scógr, Falar	Several thick forest once occupied the area of Holstein, from which the territory derives its name (Holta[z] "forest"). The name Falstr probably derives from a root fal, one of the ethnic names for a group of the Saxons, found in MLG as val, equivalent to Slavic pol(ije) ("flat land, field") with a suffix -str.	In the Þiðreks saga a forest lying between Denmark and Hunland (Northern Germany). Sequences involving the Veleti and Dietleib von Steyr occur here.
Fehmarn	Old Norse: Fimber	An island in the Baltic off the coast of Holstein. The name may derived from Slavic ve morju ("in the sea") or from the Ambrones, who appear in Widsith as Ymbrum (dative plural).	According to the Swedish version of the Þiðreks saga Vithga (Widege) fled here after he learned that Dietrich had become emperor, out of fear that Dietrich would avenge the death of his brother at Vithga's hands. The two fight a final duel here in which both are fatally wounded.
Fifeldore	Old English: Fīfeldor	A location mentioned in Widsith, line 43, which is identified with the estuary of the Eider. The word fīfel may mean "flooder, overflower".	The fight between Offa and the Myrgings was at this location.
Franks	Old English: Francan, Old English: Froncan, Middle High German: Franken, Old Norse: Frakkar	The ethnonym Franks is derived from PGmc *Frankan-, itself probably from PGmc *frankaz meaning "fierce, daring, eager to fight". An alternative etymology proposes to derive the ethnonym from the name of the Frankish weapon, the *frankōn, although it may be the other way around.	In Middle High German, the name is usually used for Franconians; in the Waltharius, the Burgundian kings are called Franci nebulones and in MHG they are sometimes called Rînvanken ("Rhine Franconians"). Separated from Rhine Franconia is East Franconia (Ostervranken), north and south of the Main River. Travelers going to or from the Burgundian kingdom from the East pass through it. In the Þiðreks saga "Frakland" refers roughly to the area in modern France under the control of the Capetian dynasty in the thirteenth century.
Frekastein	Old Norse: Frekastein	The name means "wolf cliff". It appears in the eddic poems, Helgakvíða Hjǫrvarðssonar, Helgakvíða Hundingsbana I and Helgakvíða Hundingsbana II, and in Völsunga saga. The location is considered unidentified, but a location in south-eastern Sweden has been suggested.	The location where Helgi Hjörvardsson dies after a duel, and where later Helgi Hundingsbane wins his battle against Hothbrodd.
Frisians	Old English: Frísan, Frēsan, Frȳsan,Middle High German: Friesen, Old Norse: Frísir	From PGmc *Frīsaz. Unclear origin; perhaps related to PGmc *frijaz ("free").	Conflict between the Frisians and Danes forms the basis of the Old English Finnsburh Fragment and is also alluded to in Beowulf and Widsith. In Kudrun, the Frisians are one of the people in Heoden (Hetel's) kingdom, but are otherwise absent from surviving continental tradition. In the Þiðreks saga, Attila is a Frisian prince who conquers the Hunaland, and there is an allusion to at least one other forgotten legend concerning them in the saga.
Frumtings	Old English: Frumtingas	A people mentioned in Widsith, line 68, who were the followers of the Suebian king Framta, in Spain. The name may originally have been Framtingas.	There was rivalry between the Framtings, the faction of king Framta and the Maldrings, the followers of king Maldras, when king Rechiar died in 457. The alliteration between Frumar and Framta suggests that they were near relatives. The faction may have been called Framtings when following Framta, and Frumtings when following Frumar. When Frumar died 464, Richimund could unite the Sueves and become sole king.
Fyn	Old Norse: Fjón	An island in what is today Denmark.	In Völsunga saga, Gudrun and Thora make a tapestry showing Sigar and Siggeir doing battle on the island.
Fyrisvellir	Old Norse: Fýrisvellir	The plains (vellir, "wolds") south of Uppsala. The first element is from Old East Norse *føre "soggy hay meadow" or "inundated area" and there are remains of the name in the small lakes (Övre Föret and Nedre Föret). The phoneme ø was misinterpreted in the Icelandic tradition and replaced with y.	Mentioned in Ynglinga saga, Styrbjarnar þáttr Svíakappa, Hervarar saga and Hrólfs saga kraka.
Garda	Middle High German: Garte	Garda in medieval Lombardy, modern Veneto.	The home of Hildebrand and the capital of Ortnit. Ortnit's analogue in the Þiðreks saga is instead associated with Novgorod (Holmgarðr).
Geats	Old Norse: gautar, Old English: Gēatas	There are several arguments that connect the Geats and the Goths, and some of them are linguistic ones. The Geatas/gautar ethnonym is derived from PGmc *gautaz a different ablaut grade of the same root that gave Goths (*gutaniz), and ablauting was used to connect related geographic entities. The two names probably meant "pourers (of semen)", i.e. "men".	The ethnonym originally probably referred exclusively to the population of Gautland ("Geatland"), modern Västergötland, but in Old Norse, it could also include the people of Östergötland. Later it was extended to the population of Götaland ("lands of the Geats"), which was coined to separate it from the core territory Västergötland. The Anglo-Saxons seem to have confused the Geats with the Jutes once the latter people were no longer important. The nature of how they were subsumed into Sweden is an old and inflammatory debate, influenced by a strong movement of popular modern Geatish revisionism.
Gefflegan	Old English: Gefflēgan	A people mentioned in Widsith, line 60. Malone analyses it as gefl, an epithet cognate with Gothic gifla ("pinnacle"), an Ēgan which would refer to the Aviones. Their location may have been in Jutland.	
Gepids	Old English: Gifðas, Old English: Gefþan Latin: Gepidae	The Gepids had migrated from southern Sweden to the mouth of the Vistula by the 1st c. In the next century they moved to the Hungarian plain, where they together with other Germanic tribes defeated the Huns in 454. In the 6th c. the Lombards defeated them and they disappear from history.	According to Beowulf they were still associated with their old homeland in Sweden.
Gjukungs/Gibichungen	Old Norse: Gjúkungar	The sons of Gjuki, alternative name for the Burgundian kings.	The name appears to be an Old Norse neologism and is absent from the German tradition.
Glasir Grove	Old Norse: Glasislundr	Glasir means "resplendent". It is one of several poetic place names found in Helgakvíða Hjǫrvarðssonar.	
Glæsisvellir	Old Norse: Glæsisvellir	Glæsisvellir was the mythical kingdom of Guðmundr in the north-east of Scandinavia that appears in several legendary sagas and in Gesta Danorum. According to Rudolf Simek, it was most likely not based on pagan Germanic traditions but created in medieval Scandinavia through foreign influence.	
Glomman	Old English: Glomman	A people mentioned in Widsith, line 69, who may have referred to the Lemovii mentioned by Tacitus, or the people at the Glomma river in Norway.	Both the Lemovii and the Glomma have been analysed with ON glammi ("wolf" i.e. "barker").
Gnipalund or Gnipa Grove	Old Norse: Gnípalundr	Gnípa means "peak", but the location is unidentified.	In the Völsunga saga a good harbour in Granmar's kingdom. In Helgakvíða Hundingsbana I, a location in Granmar's kingdom, where Sinfjötli is said to have been castrated by gýgjar.
Gnipafjord	Old Norse: Gnipafjǫrðr	For gnipa, see above.	A fjord mentioned in connection with the town Hvítabœr, in Ragnars saga Loðbrókar.
Gnitaheath	Old Norse: Gnitaheiðr	Possibly meaning "heath of debris."	The heath where the dragon Fafnir lives. In the twelfth century, the Icelandic pilgrim Nikulús Bergsson was shown the location of Gnitaheath south of Paderborn in Germany.
Götaland	Old Norse: Gautland, Old English: Geatland	See Geats.	
Goths	Old Norse: gotar, Old English: gotan	A Germanic tribe that moved from the Baltic sea area and settled in Ukraine before splitting up into Visigoths and Ostrogoths. The ethnonym Goths is derived from PGmc *Gutaniz (pl.) from PGmc *geutan meaning "to pour, to mould" and it is the same as that of the population of Gotland, The ethnonym is closely related to that of the Geats with which it shares etymology, probably meaning "pourers (of semen)", i.e. "men".	Old Norse does not differentiate between Gotlanders and Goths and Old English between them and Geats. In Middle High German epic, the name Goths is not used, despite the prominence of Gothic heroes such as Dietrich von Bern.
Gothiscandza	Latin: Gothiscandza	Presumably from *Gutisk-andja, i.e. "Gothic end", or from *Guti-Skandia which means "Gothic Scandinavia", and possibly the origin of the city names Gdańsk and Gdynia, in northern Poland, where the Goths are reported to have settled after their migration from Scandinavia.	The vast majority of scholars consider Jordanes' account of a Gothic migration from Scandinavia to the mouth of the Vistula, c. 100 B.C. to be trustworthy in its general outline.
Greeks	Old English: Crēacas, Middle High German: Krieche(n), Old Norse: Grecia, Girkland	The Greeks are an Indo-European people living in Greece but also ruling the Byzantine Empire; the name probably derives from a single Greek tribe. The name derives in Germanic languages via Gothic, regularly showing initial k for g.	Widsith places the Greeks under the rule of Caesar (Old English: Casere), reflecting the Byzantine Empire. In Middle High German epic, a number of characters are associated with Greece or the Eastern Roman Empire, including Dietrich von Kriechen, Hugdietrich, and Wolfdietrich. In the Þiðreks saga, it is treated as part of the domains of other kings, such as Ermanaric or the Russian Hertnið (Ortnit). The conquests by the Rus' rulers in the saga could reflect historical attacks by the Rus' on Byzantium.
Greutungi	Latin: Greotingi, Old Norse: Grýtingar, Old English: Greotinʒas	Greuting was an East Gothic tribal name derived from PGmc *ʒreutan, meaning "stone, gravel". It is preserved in German Graudenz from Old Prussian Graudingis.	Appears in the Hlǫðskvíða part of Hervarar saga
Grindir	Old Norse: Grindir	A location that appears in Völsunga saga based on a misreading of í grindom ("within a harbour marked out with stakes") in Helgakvíða Hundingsbana I.	Granmar reports that Helgi Hundingsbane has a large force there.
Grove of Bondage	Old Norse: Fjǫturlundr	In Helgakvíða Hundingsbana II, Helgi ("dedicated to the gods") is killed by his brother-in-law Dag using a spear that he has been given by Odin.	This has long been compared to an account by Tacitus on the Semnones. They had a grove that could only be entered when they were fettered, and the god who was worshiped was probably Odin, and being fettered may have been an imitation of Odin's self-sacrifice.

== H–K ==
Modernized name	Names in medieval languages	Name meaning and/or identification	Notes
Hald (North and South)	Old English: Hæleþan	The Hæleþan were a people mentioned in Widsith, line 81. The name Halla herred is attested in the Doomesday book of Valdemar II of Denmark for an area at the Randers Fjord in north Jutland. The attestation in Widsith has also been emended to Hæreþan and connected to the Charudes.	The North Germanic form is from *halþar, while the OE name shows another grade, haluþi, which changed into halyþi, to hæliþi, and finally to Hæleþ. The ON Hǫlðar corresponds to the OE form, and was a heiti for "men", and such words were commonly derived from ethnonyms. The people are probably attested as the Chali by Ptolemy.
Hälsingland	Old Norse: Helsingjaland, Helsingjar, Hælsingaland, Old English: Hælsingas?	The name is originally an ethnonym, the Helsings, with the element -land, signifying their "territory". The ethnonym is a genitive plural of hals ("neck") referring to a narrow strait, and in this case the narrow part of the Gulf of Bothnia. It was long an independent region of Scandinavia, and it probably did not become a part of Sweden until the Christianization in the 11th c. The laws of the Helsings concerned all of the northern 2/3 of Sweden, Norrland, until at least 1436.	During the Roman era, the region was the principal recipient of Roman objects in what today is Sweden, and it is also where the earliest finds of Samanid coins have been made in Sweden.
Hælsingas	Old English: Hælsingas	A people that is mentioned in Widsith as ruled by Wade. Müllenhoff connected the name with hals ("neck") although he considered them fictive. They cannot be identified securely, but are generally considered to have been a real people. Most scholars localize them somewhere on the shores of the Baltic Sea. They were identified as early as Price (1826) as the people of Hälsingland (see above), he considered Helsinki (Helsingfors), Helsingborg and Helsingör to be traces left by their settlers. That these names were spread by colonizers is a view also shared by Chambers (1912).	Chambers comments that philologists around 1912 generally have connected this people with the name of a river that appears in Ptolemy, the Χάλουσος ποταμός, but the location of this river is disputed.
Hatafjord	Old Norse: Hatafjorðr	The name means "Hati's fjord" and is where lived the jötunn Hati, whose names means "hateful", in Helgakvíða Hjǫrvardssonar.	The location where Helgi Hjörvardsson kills the jötunn Hati. The jötunn's daughter Hrímgerðr is upset and starts a raunchy flyting contest with Helgi and his companion Atli^{2} that ends with Hrímgerðr being caught by sunrise and turning to stone.
Hatun	Old Norse: Hátún	The name means the "high enclosure".	A location mentioned in Helgakvíða Hundingsbana I among the estates given to the hero at his naming ceremony.
Heaðobards	Old English: Heaðubeardan	The Heaðobards are sworn enemies of the Danes, who are mentioned in Beowulf and Widsith. A Germanic people who were possibly a remnant of the Langobards. The name is from PGmc *χaþuz ("war") and *barđaz ("beard").	In Beowulf, Hróðgar's daughter Freawaru will marry their king Ingeld to bring peace between the tribes. At the wedding a young Dane will offend the Heaðobards by carrying one of their captured swords. An old Heaðobard will cause a young Heaðobard to kill the Dane and escape with the sword. After this Ingeld's interest in the bride will diminish and the feud will start again.
Heaðoreamas		See Romerike.	
Hebrews	Old English: Ebrēas	A people mentioned in Widsith, line 83, possibly referring to the people of Judah in contrast to those of Israel.	
Heðinsey	Old Norse: Heðinsey	It may be the same island as Hiddensee near Rügen.	It is mentioned in Helgakvíða Hundingsbana I as a location from where a fleet with warriors was sent to him. The location is probably taken from the tradition of the island of Hjaðningavíg (see below).
Hedmark	Old Norse: Heiðmǫrk, Heiðnir, Heinir, Old English: Hǣðnas	The people of Hedmark are mentioned in Widsith, line 81, as the Hǣðnas.	The people may be mentioned in Ptolemy as the χαιδεινοι.
Helmings	Old English: Helmingas	The name is from Helm means "protector", and a Wulfing called Helm is mentioned in Widsith, line 29. Wealhtheow, Hrothgar's wife is called ides Helminga ("lady of the Helmings") in Beowulf (610), which means that she belonged to Helm's clan and was a Wulfing.	
Heodenings	Old English: Heodeningas, Old Norse: Hjaðningar, Middle High German: Hegelinge	*Heðaningas, from the personal name Heoden or maybe meaning "people of the skins". The German form may show a phonetic development of -tl- to -gl- or have been influenced by the place name Högling near Tegernsee.	Ethnic name of Heoden's people. In Widsith, he is king of the "island-Rugians" (Holmryg[as]), in Kudrun his kingdom seems to be in Denmark, and in Sörla Þattr, he is king of "Serkland", which may mean Africa.
Heorot	Old English: Heorot	The hall of the Danish king Hrothgar, and it appears in Widsith, line 49, and in Beowulf.	The name has been connected to the Danish champion Hort(ar) from Lejre, who appears in the account of the Battle of Brávellir in Gesta Danorum.
Herefaran	Old English: Herefaran	A people who are mentioned in line 34, in Widsith, but whose identity is unknown, but the name may mean "pirate".	
Herelings	Old English: Herelingas, Middle High German: Harlunge	A people mentioned in Widsith, line 112, whose name means the "followers of Herela". The name Herela means "he of the army", which fits the god Odin, and corresponds to king Herla, the leader of the Wild Hunt (Odin).	The name corresponds to the Harlungs of the Þiðrikssaga.
Himin Fells, and Himin Meadows	Old Norse: Himinfjǫll and Himinvangar	The two locations are mentioned in Helgakvíða Hundingsbana I and mean "sky fells" and "sky meadows". Himinfjǫll may be simply a descriptive word, but both are probably created for poetic purposes.	
Hindarfjall	Old Norse: Hindarfjall	ON for "Hind mountain". It is called Hindarheið in Norna-Gests þáttr, and Skatalund ("grove of heroes") in Helreið Brynhildar, and Norna-Gests þáttr.	The mountain in the land of the Franks where Brunhild is asleep behind flames in the Norse tradition.
Hinnøya	Old Norse: Ǫmð, Old English: Amoþingas	An island whose people are mentioned in Widsith. It is the largest island what is today Norway.	The island was the seat of the 6th c. petty king Goðgestr, an ancestor of the earls of Lade, and notable because of his death. Ynglinga saga relates that the Swedish king Aðils (Eadgils) sent Goðgestr a horse named Hrafn that threw him off so that he died.
Hlé Fells	Old Norse: Hlébjǫrg	The word hlé means "leeward".	In ''Helgakvíða Hundingsbana II, it is where Helgi Hundingsbane killed the sons of Hrollaugr.
Hlymdalir	Old Norse: Hlymdalir	Hlymr means "clash, as of hooves", and dalir means "dales".	The place where Aslaug is raised by Brunhild's fosterfather Heimir.
Hocings	Old English: Hōcingas	A people mentioned in Widsith, line 29, and it is the plural form of a patronym and used for a people ruled by a dynasty. In Beowulf it is explained that Hoc was the father of the Danes Hnæf and Hildeburh, so it appears that the Hocings were a Danish group. The fact that there is h-alliteration, and Hnæf and his men are referred to has Healfdene and Scyldings, suggests that the Hocings were related to the ruling dynasty of the Danes, the Scyldings.	The patronym appears in no other context for a group of people, but Charlemagne's wife Hildegard had a great-grandfather named Huoching, and Høkingr is a sea-king in an Icelandic poem, where it means Hoc's sword.
Hofferdh	Old Norse: Hofferdh	An unidentified town in Suáwen (Swabia, but meaning generally southern Germany). The name is probably allegorical and from ON hofferd ("pride," "pomp") from MHG Hoverde/Hôchvart ("pride" also "noble, elegant living"), from MHG hôch ("high") and varn ("to live, to fare").	According to the Swedish version of the Þiðreks saga, Dietrich saved himself from being carried to hell by a black horse by praying to God and Mary. He then hunted down Vithga (Widege) to the island of Fehmarn off Holstein, where both were mortally wounded in a duel. Dietrich then went to the nearby town of Hofferdh and died.
Holmrugians	Old English: Holmryc[g]as	The "island Rugians", a people mentioned in Widsith, line 21, and the name may refer to the Holmrygir of Rogaland or to the Rugians.	Malone points out the usual sense of holm in Old English was "sea" and suggest that this indicates that Widsith referred to the Continental Rugians.
Hreith-Goths	Old English: Hrædas, Old Norse: Hreiðgotar	The identification is disputed: Otto Höfler argues that the name applies to all Goths, whereas Otto von Friesen argued that it referred only to Goths who lived near the Vistula. The name is given five possible explanations by Jan der Vries: 1) it could be ON hreiðr (nest), referring to those Goths who did not migrate from the Baltic; 2) it could be from hróðr (fame), but de Vries rejects this; 3) it could be a Germanization of the Adriatic Sea (from Gothic: *Hraiðimari-gutans, from Latin: Hadriatica mare); 4) it could be from an unattested PGmc *hreid- ("elite, chosen"); 5) it could come from a root hreiðr meaning first "fence" and then "assembly" (de Vries rejects this as well).	Widsith locates the Hrædas on the Vistula, and the Hervarar Saga similarly located Hreiðgotaland adjacent to Garðaríki, Hunaland, and Saxland, while Haukr Erlendsson placed them in eastern Poland. West Norse sources such as Snorri tend to instead localize Hreiðgotaland in Jutland. The Rök runestone mentions a Hraiðmaraʀ (Hreith-sea).
Hreosnaburh	Old English: Hreosnaburh	The name may mean "hill of sorrows", but Orchard considers it meaningless unless emended as Hrefnaburh ("raven's stronghold"). It is one of several legendary place names that have a fictive quality. Just like the names of the Danish rulers alliterated with their residence Heorot/Hleiðr, the Yngling rulers' names alliterated with their residence Uppsala, the names of the Geatish rulers alliterate with their seat Hreosnaburh.	When the Geatish prince Haethcyn accidentally had killed his brother Herebeald with arrow, their father Hrethel died of grief because he couldn't avenge his dead son on his last son. With Haethcyn left as the king of the Geats, the Swedes took advantage of the situation and successfully raided the Geats at Hreosnaburh.
Hringstaðir	Old Norse: Hringstaðir and Old Norse: Hringstǫð	The two locations are mentioned in Helgakvíða Hundingsbana I as estates given to the hero at his naming ceremony, and they are probably inspired by Ringsted in Denmark.	
Hronan	Old English: Hronan	A people who are mentioned in line 63, in Widsith, but whose identity is unknown. The two other ethnonyms that appear in the same line belong to the southern part of the Scandinavian peninsula. The name corresponds to the Icelandic hrani ("coarse, crude, heedless person") and the Old Norse name Hrani ("blusterer, boaster"). The word hrani has been explained as "the one who squeals like a pig".	Several scholars have identified them as the Ranii of Jordanes, and others with Hronesness in Beowulf. Other suggested identifications are "whale hunters" and the people of Hærnborg in Jutland.
Hronesness	Old English: Hrones Næs	Hron means "whale", and næs(s) means "headland, bluff". It is one of several legendary place names that have a fictive quality with an element from the natural world, and like several constructed with the name of an animal in the genitive + a common word for a natural feature, and it seems to be a poetic invention.	Where the Geats raise the barrow over Beowulf's remains.
Hundings	Old English: Hundingas	A people who are mentioned in Widsith lines 23 and 81. It means "sons of dogs" and may be an old derogatory term for the Lombards and that later was narrowed down to those who lived in East Holstein. The epithet may have an old history with the Lombards and be related to Hungar (*hund-gãr, i.e. "dog spear") or Lamicho, who was the second king of the Lombards according to Paul the Deacon.	The king Hunding who appears in the Poetic Edda and king Hundingus in Gesta Danorum are also related.
Hundland	Old Norse: Hundland	It is probably a creation by the poet to give a country for king Hunding to rule in Helgakvíða Hundingsbana II. It is not the same as Hunland, the land of the Huns.	
Huns	Old English: Hūnas, Old Norse: Húnar, Middle High German: Hiunen	The Huns, a non-Germanic nomadic tribe.	In Old Norse, Húnar is used both for Atli's subjects and as a general name for people from south of Scandinavia. In Middle High German epic, the Huns are identified with the Hungarians. In the Þiðrekssaga Húnaland is located in Northern Germany and roughly corresponds to the Duchy of Westphalia.
Hvítabǿr	Old Norse: Hvítabǿr	In Ragnars saga loðbrókar, the city seems to be Vitaby in Scania, however the saga may preserve a connection of the English town Whitby.	A city raided by Ragnar's sons in Ragnars saga loðbrókar. Rognvald is killed there.
Idumings	Old English: Idumingas	A people who are mentioned in Widsith, line 87. The name may refer to a Livonian population, the Ydumaei, who were mentioned by Henricus Lettus.	
Indians (India)	Old English: Indēas	The inhabitants of South Asia, mentioned in Widsith line 83.	A misreading of the name as Judeum was adopted by several scholars.
Ilwan	Old English: Ilwan or Old English: Eolum (dative)	A people who are mentioned in Widsith, line 87. The name refers to the same Germanic people on the lower Vistula, as the Helveconae of Tacitus and the Elvaeones of Ptolemy.	The difference between the three forms of Widsith, Tacitus and Ptolemy is that Elvaeones has a ja-suffix, Helvecones has a k-suffix, while Ilwan has a nil-grade of the Ptolemaic suffix.
Isenstein	Middle High German: Îsenstein	From Middle High German îsen ("iron") and stein ("stone"). Brunhild's castle in the Nibelungenlied.	Localized on Iceland (Middle High German: Îsland) in the Nibelungenlied, possibly showing knowledge of Old Norse traditions. However, "Iceland" shows no similarities to Iceland besides being an island far away from the Burgundian realm.
Island of the Hjaðningavíg	Middle High German: Wülpenwerde or Wülpensand, Old Norse: Höð or Háey	Assuming an origin in the Baltic sea, the original location may have been Hiddensee, (Old Norse: Heðinsey, island of Heoden), an island in the Baltic and the location given by the Gesta Danorum.	The battle is variously located: the German tradition places it on the island of Wulpen in the Scheldt estuary. The Norse tradition places it on the island of Hod off Norway or on Hoy in the Orkneys, while the Gesta Danorum places it at Hiddensee.
Israelites	Old English: Isrāhelas	A people mentioned in Widsith, line 82, possibly referring to the people of Israel in contrast to those of Judah.	
Iste	Old English: Īste	A people mentioned in Widsith, line 87, and identified by Malone as Ostrogoths at the Baltic Sea, and not identical to the Greutungi of Ukraine. They have also been identified with the Aesti of Tacitus, with the Istaevones and with the Istrians.	Malone rejects the other identifications on linguistic and historic grounds.
Italian Peninsula	Old English: Eatul	A location mentioned in Widsith, line 70, and the name is the Old English form of Italy.	
Jassarfjǫll	Old Norse: Jassarfjǫll	Several theories have been proposed such as the Czech Jeseniky Mountains, the north Hungarian Jaszygi mountains and hills in Croatian Banovina. However, Jas- can be connected to the Alans and so Jassarfjǫll were probably the Jas/Alan hills, the Donets Ridge which were considered sacred by locals until the 16th century.	
Jochgrimm	Middle High German: Jochgrîm	Mountain in South Tyrol.	The three queens who send Ecke out to seek Dietrich von Bern in the Eckenlied reside here.
Jutes	Old Norse: jótar, Old English: Ēotas, Ēotan Latin: Iutae, Eucii?	The derivation is unclear, but suggested meanings are "people" (cf. ON ýtar), "land" (cf. Greek οὖδας) or "waterland" (cf. the Swedish lake names Juten and Jutern). They are associated with Jutland and took part in the Anglo-Saxon migration to England, which implies early Scandinavian elements among the Anglo-Saxons, but it is also possible that the West Germanic Jutes that left for England were replaced by North Germanic people who inherited their name.	There is a long-standing debate in Beowulf studies whether the word for Jutes actually refer to eotenas (sometimes translated as "giants") and whether the Frisians refer to "Jutes". Moreover, it has been proposed that the Geats of Beowulf were in fact Jutes.
Kerlingen	Middle High German: Kerlingen, Old Norse: Tarlungaland (Þiðreks saga)	French/Franks, the land or people of Charlemagne. The form in Þiðreks saga appears to be a distortion of Karlunga-land, from the MHG name.	In German tradition, the name is especially associated with Walter of Aquitaine. In the Þiðreks saga, the location of Sigurd/Siegfried's kingdom, south of Frakland (France).

== L–S ==
Modernized name	Names in medieval languages	Name meaning and/or identification	Notes
Laganess, Saga Ness	Old Norse: Láganes, Old Norse: á nesi Ságu	In Völsunga saga called Láganes instead of á nesi Ságu that appears in Helgakvíða Hundingsbana I. Lágr (as in Láganes) means "low", whereas Sága (as in á nesi Ságu) was the name of a Norse goddess.	In the Völsunga saga and Helgakvíða Hundingsbana I, Sinfjötli says that he made Granmar/Gudmund pregnant with nine wolves in the location.
Læsø	Old Norse: Hlésey	The name means "leeward island". In ''Helgakvíða Hundingsbana II, the hero lies that he lives there. In Oddrúnargrátr, the heroine reports that she visited Geirmund in his castle on the island.	
Lejre	Old Norse: Hleiðr or Old Norse: Hleiðargarðr	According to the Skjöldunga saga, the oldest residence of the Skjöldung clan. Beowulf mentions the hall of Heorot in the location, and it is supposedly the site of Harald Wartooth's grave. Thietmar of Merseburg reported of great pagan sacrifices very much like those in Uppsala. His report may be substantiated by finds of 10th c. buildings on the location. The names of the Danish rulers alliterated with their residence Heorot/Hleiðr, just as the Geatish rulers with Hreosnaburh, and the Yngling rulers' names alliterated with their residence Uppsala.	Generally identified with the location of Heorot in Beowulf
Leonas	Old English: Lēonas	A people mentioned in Widsith, line 80, and identified by Malone as the ljónar of Ynglingatal, i.e. the liunar or Östergötland, but Iversen, who partly bases a study on Malone's analysis of Widsith, considers this identification too speculative to even be mentioned.	Other identifications suggested by scholars are the Leonas in Armorica, the Asturians of León, Spain and the Liothida of Jordanes.
Lidings, Lidvikings	Old English: Lidwicingas, Lidingas, Old Norse: Liðungar	Lidingas is an emendation of the MS' Lidwicingum as Lidingum. A people mentioned in Widsith, line 80, and mentioned as Liðungar in Íslenzkir Annálar, and generally accepted as the inhabitants of the Oslo region.	Another identification is the Letavici of Armorica whose name has forms like Lidwiccas in Old English annals.
Limfjord	Old Norse: Limfjorðr	In Atlamál, the Limfjord in northern Jutland separates the kingdom of the Huns from the kingdom of the Gjukungs.	
Locheim	Middle High German: Loch	A town once located between Mainz and Worms on the Rhine that was destroyed by a flood in the thirteenth century.	The place where Hagen has the hord of the Nibelungs sunk in the Rhine in the Nibelungenlied.
Logafjöll	Old Norse: Logafjǫll	The means "flame mountains". It is mentioned in Helgakvíða Hundingsbana I and Helgakvíða Hundingsbana II.	In shining splendour, the Valkyrie Sigrún meets Helgi Hundingsbane for the first time, and the poet gives the place the fitting name "flame mountains".
Lombards, Lombardy	Latin: Langobardi, Middle High German: Lamparten, Old English: Longbeardan, Old Norse: Langbarðar	A Germanic tribe, their name means "men with long beards". In the medieval period, the name "Lombardy" referred to a larger area than the modern Lombardy region in northern Italy.	The Kingdom of Ortnit, Wolfdietrich, and Dietrich von Bern is referred to as "Lombardy" (Lamparten), which is also used as a people name. The Þiðreks saga sometimes distinguishes it from "Amlungaland" (see Amals).
Lorsch Abbey	Middle High German: Lôrs	A Benedictine monastery located 15 kilometers from Worms, founded 764.	According to the Nibelungenlied C, Kriemhild and her mother Ute both stayed at the monastery. A large sarcophagus in the chapel is said to be Siegfried's coffin.
Mälaren	Old Norse: Lǫgrinn, Loginn, Lauginn, í Leginum	The name Lǫgrinn is the definite form of lǫgr which means "water" and "lake", and is cognate with lake. It is located west of Stockholm.	In Norse mythology it was created by the goddess Gefjun when she tricked the Swedish king Gylfi into giving her the amount of land she could plough during a day and a night. She pulled away a large piece of land and put it between the island of Fyn and Scania, creating Zealand. What remained was filled with water creating Mälaren. The lake is mentioned in e.g. Ragnarsdrápa, Heimskringla and Ásmundar saga kappabana.
Merovingian	Old English: Merewīoing		
Maerings, Maeringa burg	Old English: Mǣringa burg, Old Norse: Mæringa[r] (corrected from marika). A 12-c. gloss from Regensburg gives Middle High German: Meranare for Goths.	Possibly the clan name of Theodoric the Great, from mer/mær (famous), thus "the famous Goths". The element was commonly used in his family; his father was Theodemer, and his uncles Valamer and Vidumer. Possibly connected to Maronia (Istria, (MHG Mêrân)) or Meran in South Tyrol.	People/place name associated with Dietrich von Bern in Deor and on the Rök runestone.
Mautern an der Donau	Middle High German: Mûtâren, Middle High German: Mûter	A town in Austria located on the Danube.	The Burgundians pass through Mautern on their way to Attila's court. In Virginal, Mautern is the location of Dietrich von Bern's captivity among giants, and the place is referred to in connection with Dietrich and Heime (Háma's) liberation by Witige in Alpharts Tod as well.
Mofdings, Ofdings	Old English: Mōfdingas, Ōfdingas	The Widsith manuscript reads Mofdingum in line 86, and whom it referred to is unknown, but Malone emends it as Ofdingum and derives it from Ovida. As a dynastic name it would have referred to the Ostrogoths of Geberic's time.	It may be assumed that the Ostrogoths of Geberic's time (4th c.) still controlled the Vistula basin.
Moinsheim and Moinsheimar	Old Norse: Móinsheim and Móinsheimar	Mentioned in Helgakvíða Hundingsbana I and Helgakvíða Hundingsbana II. Bugge who tried to locate the heroic lays in Denmark, suggested Møn. See also Moin in Norse mythology.	
Møn	Old English: Moide, Old Norse: Mói	The Moide were a group people mentioned in Widsith line 84, and identified as the inhabitants of the island of Møn. The old name of the island was Mói and it appears in Adam of Bremen's work as Moiland. The name is derived from *mōh with an aja-suffix and the Old English form regularly evolved from it. It is also identified with a battle mentioned in the Poetic Edda, see Móinsheim-, above.	Older scholarship interpreted the name as referring to the "Medes".
Moors	Middle High German: Mœre	From medieval Latin Maurus ("Moor").	The hero Siegfried von Moorland and some others are described as Moors in medieval German epic. In Siegfried von Moorland's case, Moor may be used synonymously with "heathen," as he appears to be a Viking.
Mornaland	Old Norse: Mornaland	Mentioned in Oddrúnargrátr ("Oddrun's lament"), but it is not known from anywhere else. Jónsson commented that he name reminded him of the Myrgings (see below), and Cleasby & Sigfússon suggest Moravia. The verb morna means "to mourn".	
Munarheim	Old Norse: Munarheimr	The name means the "home of love". It is one of several poetic place names found in Helgakvíða Hjǫrvarðssonar.	
Munarvágr	Old Norse: Munarvágr or Unavágar	The name appears with variations in spelling. If the first element is Una-, it means "where life is good". The element Munr means "mind", "desire" and "love", and vágr which means "wave". It is located on the island of Samsø in the sagas.	It is mentioned in e.g. Hervarar saga, Orvar-Odd's saga, Ragnar Lodbrok's saga and Helgakvíða Hundingsbana I, 31
Mirkwood	Old Norse: Myrkviðr	The name means "dark forest." It is unclear if the forest had any geographical meaning originally. As for the location in the Battle of the Goths and the Huns, Omeljan Pritsak identifies it with what would later be called the "dark blue forest" (Goluboj lěsь) and the "black forest" (Černyj lěsь) near the Dnieper. German chronicler Thietmar von Merseburg (died 1018) uses Miriquidui to refer to the Ore Mountains, which would be on the route taken by a messenger crossing from the Rhine (Burgundians) to the Danube (Huns).	A forest mentioned almost exclusively in Old Norse heroic poems that is often on the border between one land and another, as between the Burgundians and Huns in Atlakviða. It is often between the Goths and Huns.
Myrgings	Old English: Myrgingas	In Widsith lines 42–43, king Offa of Angel marked the border to the Myrgings at the Eider (Fifeldore). The word murge or myrge means "pleasing" and "agreeable", modern merry, from PGmc *murʒuz ("short"), and according to Much it was a derogatory nickname that was raised to a title of honour for Langobards. However, they are also identified as Saxons or Suebians. Clarke notes that it is difficult to establish their identity as it may have been a dynastic name, and while Saxo (Gesta Danorum) calls them Saxons, his contemporary Sven Aggesen calls them Alamani. Also in the end of the Offa part in Widsith (line 44) it is said that the border established by Offa was upheld by Angles (Offa's people) and Suebians (Swæfe), which was a collective name for the tribes in the Elbe basin.	The reason why king Eadgils of the Myrgings appears in 12th c. Danish sources (Saxo and Aggesen) as a king of Sweden may be that he was originally called Swebe kyning and that Sweba was replaced with Svea ("Swedes") which was by then more familiar.
Myrkheim	Old Norse: Myrkheimr	The name is ON for "World of Darkness" and is probably a deliberately irreal location.	The place where Gunnar is thrown into the snake pit in Atlakviða. Icelander Nikulús Bergsson identified as having taken place in the city of Luni, Italy.
Nibelungs	Middle High German: Nibelunge, Old Norse: Niflungar, Latin: Franci nebulones (Waltharius)	Name could originate with the Nibelungids, a Frankish dynasty installed in the conquered Burgundian kingdom in southern Gaul. The etymology is uncertain, possibly named after Nivelles (Gmc *Niuwa-alha "new sanctuary"). The word has been influenced by PGmc *nebula- ("mist, darkness") or *nibila- ("low, deep, dark").	The name is consistently applied to the Burgundians in the Old Norse sources, including the Þiðreks saga, but in the German tradition it can also refer to magical beings under the control of Siegfried. In the Nibelungenlied, the Burgundians are not called "Nibelungen" until the second half of the poem.
Niederland	Middle High German: Niderlant	Not the Netherlands, but the low country around Xanten.	Sigmund and Siegfried's kingdom.
Njarar	Old Norse: Niarar	It's uncertain if the name represents a historical people. They have been connected to the Swedish region of Nerike or with the Belgic Nervii tribe.	In Völundarkviða, the people of King Nithhad, which it apparently places in Sweden.
Normans, Normandy	Middle High German: Ormanie		The land of Ludwig and Hartmut in Kudrun. Certain elements seem to derive from knowledge of the Normans of Sicily rathar than Normandy in France.
Norvasund, Orvasund	Old Norse: Nǫrvasundr, Old Norse: Ǫrvasundr	Norvasund means "narrow strait" and was the name for the Strait of Gibraltar. Orvasund means "arrow sound".	In the Völsunga saga a location from where troops were sent to aid Helgi Hundingsbane. In the first lay of Helgi Hundingsbane named Örvasund.
Oium	Latin: Oium	Oium is a Gothic word in the dative plural from and means "in the fruitful fields" or "on fruitful island", and it was located in Ukraine.	In Jordanes' Getica, king Filimer is reported to have led the Goths there from Gothiscandza.
Ongendmyrgings	Old English: Ongendmyrgingas	A group of people mentioned in Widsith line 85, and the name may have referred to a branch of the Myrgings living in western Schleswig.	Malone compares the word ongen(d) with name of the Swedish king Ongentheow He connects ongen to ing and ang that may be in grade relation, which would be the simplest way of explaining the form Ingentheow in Widsith for the name Ongentheow. The words relate to "spear", "sting" and "prick" and thus to phallus, and the god Ing (Freyr) was a phallic god.
Pechenegs	Middle High German: Petschenære	A nomadic Turkic people, who attacked Constantinople in the eleventh century.	Depicted as skilled bowmen who can shoot a bird while riding who are subject to Attila in the Nibelungenlied.
Perse	Old English: Perse	A group of people mentioned in Widsith, line 84, and it may refer to the Celtic Parisi tribe at the Humber. If it were emended to werse it would refer to the versir, the inhabitants of Voss near Bergen, Norway, and if emended to Merse it would refer to the inhabitants of Mors, an island in the Limfjord.	Traditionally the name has been connected to the Persians.
Picts	Old English: Peohtas	A group of people mentioned in Widsith line 79, and the name refers to the Picts of Scotland.	
Poles, Poland	Middle High German: Pôlân or Middle High German: Bôlân, Old Norse: Pulinar	A Slavic people living in modern Poland. The name derives from Slavic pole ("field, prairie") + the derivative suffix -jane and means "prairie dwellers".	In the Nibelungenlied, they are subject to Attila. In Biterolf und Dietleib, Biterolf leads Attila's armies against the rebellious Poles and Rus'. Several heroes, including Hornboge, are associated with Poland. In Þiðreks saga, the area is vaguely located between Hunaland and Rus' and is partially ruled by Rus', partially by the Veleti. This may be because Poland had lost Pomerania by the time of the saga's composition and thus had no direct connection to Scandinavia via the Baltic. The saga also uses the names Smáland for Lesser Poland and Þioðland for Greater Poland.
Pomeranians, Pomerania	Middle High German: Pomerân	A Slavic tribe inhabiting the area east of the Oder River.	Dietleib conquers the Pomeranians for Attila in Biterolf und Dietleib. In the Kaiserchronik, the Pomeranians are among Dietrich von Bern (Theodoric the Great)'s force invading Italy to fight Odoacer.
Prussians	Middle High German: Priuzen	A Baltic people who were either wiped out or conquered by the Teutonic Knights.	In Biterolf und Dietleib, Attila's Huns conquer the Prussians, and they are mentioned in other epics as well.
Raben	Middle High German: Raben(e), Old Norse: Rana, possibly Gronsport	Ravenna, Italy. The Þiðreks saga locates the same battle at a place called Gronsport on the Moselle river in northern Germany; this could reflect a corruption of Gregenborg ("Greek-city"), one of the names given to Ravenna in the saga. It may instead reflect an alternative localization in Northern German legend, in which case various explanations for the name have been offered.	Site of an enormous battle between Dietrich von Bern and Ermanaric's forces, during which Witige slays Dietrich's brother Diether and the sons of Attila and Helche. In the Þiðreks saga, Ermanaric gives Ravenna to Witige after he has killed the Harlungen.
Ramsta	Old Norse: Hrafnista	A small homestead in Northern Norway that has given its name to four legendary sagas, the Hrafnistumannasögur.	
Raudabjorg	Old Norse: Rauðabjǫrg	Rauða- means "red" while bjǫrg means "help, deliverance out of need or danger".	A location mentioned in Völsunga saga as the location where Helgi Hundingsbane assembled his army.
Ravenswood	Old English: Hrefna Wudu, Old English: Hrefnes Holt	A forest in Sweden. The name Hrefna Wudu is mentioned line 2925, and Hrefnes Holt in line 2935.	In the battle of Ravenswood against the Geats, the Swedish king Ongentheow fell, and Ohtere succeeded him.
Rodulsvoll, Rodulsfell	Old Norse: Rǫðulsvǫll and Rǫðulsfjall	Rǫðull may mean "the sun", but it may also mean "glory" and "halo", or "crest". Fjall means "mountain". For the meaning of vǫll, see Fýrisvellir.	Rǫðulsvǫll is mentioned by the Valkyrie Svafa as the location where the hero of the poem was born, and Rǫðulsfjall is mentioned by the hero as place near his home.
Rogheim	Old Norse: Rogheimr	Cleasby & Sigfússon suggest Rogaland.	Mentioned in Helgakvíða Hjǫrvarðssonar, as a location where the hero of the poem lives.
Romerike	Old English: Heaðoreamas, Old Norse: Raumar, Old Norse: Raumaríki, Latin: Raumariciae	The people of Romerike are mentioned as the Heaðoreamas ("battle raumar") in Beowulf and as the Raumariciae in Jordanes' Getica. The name is derived from the river Raumelfr, where raumr is derived from rjúmi or rjómi which means "calm".	North Germanic tribe
Rondings	Old English: Rondingas	A group of people mentioned in Widsith line 24. Chambers translates it as the "shield men", while Malone compares it to rondburgum ("border strongholds") and interpretes the name as the "borderers" and referring to the people of Telemark.	Other scholars have identified the name with the Reudigni of Tacitus.
Rosomoni	Latin: Rososomoni,	The name of the family of Sunilda and Ammius and Sarus in Jordanes Getica: the name may derive from Pre-Germanic **rudh-s-mn̥- "those bearing red", possibly indicating natural or dyed hair or skin color.	In the 19th century, Karl Müllenhoff believed that the name was of mythological origin, while Richard Heinzel suggested a connection to the early Slavs. Other suggestions are that the name is a version of Iranian Roxolani; however, the names given in Jordanes are clearly Germanic. Herwig Wolfram suggested a connection to the Heruli, however Helmut Castritius argues that they were a Gothic noble family.
Rugii	Old English: Rondingas	A group of people mentioned in Widsith line 69. According to Malone identical to the Holmrugians of the same poem.	Chambers located them on the Danube, which Malone considers to be incorrect.
Rumwalas	Old English: Rūmwalas	A group of people mentioned in Widsith line 69, and identifiable with the Eastern Roman Empire.	The vowel ū instead of o shows transmission through Gothic intermediaries.
Rus'	Middle High German: Riuze(n), Old Norse: Ruzi (Þiðreks saga), Old Norse: Garðar, Old Norse: Garðaríki and many other names	OES Rus' is generally accepted to derive from Finnic ruotsi ("Swedes") from the ON root roðr meaning "rower crew") and initially, it referred to the Swedes active on the waterways of Eastern Europe. Later it became the name of the state they founded, Kievan Rus'. The ON name Garðar(íki) is probably from the network of forts (garðar, cf. Slavic gorod) built to protect the routes. There are many other ON names for the region, but several of them were written down with vague geographic knowledge, distant in time and location from those who coined them.	The region and its people are often mentioned in Old Norse legendary sagas. In the Nibelungenlied, they are Attila's subjects. In Ortnit, the hero Iljas von Russland is from Rus'. In Biterolf und Dietleib, they rebel against Attila, and a reference by the poet Der Marner suggests their may have been additional songs about them. In Þiðreks saga, their king Valdemarr attacks Attila's kingdom and is killed.
North European hunters and gatherers, Sami people (Lapps), Finns	Old Norse: Finnr	Of contested origin, from e.g. PGmc *Finnaz, of unclear origin, or from PGmc *fanþian- "wandering people". Non-Germanic people that were more widespread over northern Scandinavia, Finland and northern Russia.	
Samsø	Old Norse: Samsey	A Danish island where the Swedish hero Hjalmar and the Norwegian hero Örvar-Oddr fought twelve infamous berserkers in Norse legends.	It was also the location of Munarvágr.
Sævarstath	Old Norse: Sævarstað	The name means "place by the sea", "sea-stead".	After Nidud's men had hamstrung Wayland, they confined him to an island named Sævarstað.
Saxons	Old English: Seaxe, Middle High German: Sahse(n), Old Norse: Saxar	From PGmc *Sahsaz or *Sahsōn, from the PGmc noun *sahsan, which designated a kind of small sword similar to a knife or a dagger.	The Saxons are described as proverbially fierce in Medieval German epic. In the Þiðreks saga, the name Saxland is used for northern Germany.
Scania, Scandinavia	Old English: Scedeland, Old English: Scedenig, Old Norse: Skáney, Latin: Sca(n)dinavia, Latin: Scandza	The name is derived from PGmc *skaþōn ("harm, damage") and *aʒwjō/aχwjō ("island"), and may be reconstructed as *Skaðinawiō with the same meaning ("damage island"). It may have originally denoted the south-westernmost point at Falsterbo with its dangerous shallows. In Beowulf the names Scedeland and Scedenig are used to denote the Danish territory reflecting the fact that Scania was part of the Danish realm (it stayed Danish until 1658).	The hero Biterolf is the king of Scania (Skane) in the Þiðreks saga - this may derive from his associate with Spain (Spanje) in medieval German epic.
Scoti	Old English: Scottas	A group of people mentioned in Widsith line 79, and referring to the Irish.	It can hardly refer to the Highland Scots as one scholar thought.
Scridefinns	Old English: Scridefinnas	Probably the Sámi people of Northern Scandinavia, and mentioned in Widsith, line 79, see also entry.	The prefix scride refers to skiing.
Scyldings	Old English: Scylding, Old Norse: skjǫldungr	Traditionally derived from Scyld or Skjöldr, the eponymous founder of the clan.	The Skjöldungs, the ruling clan in Lejre among whom several Norse legends and the first part of Beowulf take place.
Sea-Danes	Old English: Sǣdene	A group of people mentioned in Widsith line 29, and referring to the Danes.	The prefix sea possibly narrows them down to the Danes that had settled on the Danish islands, or it refers to the maritime might of the Danes.
Secgan	Old English: Secgan, Old English: Sycgan	In the Finnsburg fragment, there is a warrior named Sigeferth from the Secgan tribe, who Klaeber identifies as a coastal people, and Gillespie locates them on the northern coast of Germany. He notes that Sigeferth is probably the same character as Sǣferð of the Sycgan in Widsith 31. Clarke also identifies the two characters and comments that based on the name Ymber ("Ammerland"), the form sycg in Widsith may originally have been secg. He suggests that it was originally a dynastic name among the Anglo-Saxons. Sometimes they are considered to have belonged to the "half Danish tribes", although evidence is lacking, but they were in any case a "very minor ethnic group".	Klaeber derives Secgan from segc meaning "sword" and compares it to seax as in Saxons. Otherwise it is derived from PGmc *sagjaz which means "companion", "man" or "warrior" and it has cognates in OS segg and ON seggr, and also in Latin socius. This shows that they derive from a PIE form *sok^{w}i̯ós, of which the stem would be *sok^{w}h_{2}- ("friend").
Segard	Old Norse: Segarðr	In Old Norse, the name means "fortress city by the sea," whereas in the presumed German original, it would mean "enclosure by a lake." A manuscript variant Regarðr could indicate the island of Rügen as the original location.	Brunhild's stronghold in the northern Alps in Swabia in the Þiðreks saga. The iron door of the castle suggests a link to her stronghold in the Nibelungenlied Isenstein (MHG îsen = iron).
Sercings	Old English: Sercingas	A group of people mentioned in Widsith line 75, and possibly referring to the Siraces at the Black Sea, mentioned by Tacitus. It may also refer to Serkland.	Malone rejects the derivation of Serkland from Saracens because the form would have been *Serkjaland. He instead derives it from sērica, see below.
Serings	Old English: Seringas	A group of people mentioned in Widsith line 75, and the name refers to the Sēres, the people of Central Asia, a region that was in close contact with the Baltic Sea area due to the Neva and Volga river trade routes.	
Sevafjoll	Old Norse: Sevafjǫll	The name means "wet mountains". It appears in Helgakvíða Hundingsbana II.	The place where Helgi Hundingsbane lived with his Valkyrie Sigrún after having fought and won a war for her sake. They had several sons, but soon Sigrún's brother killed him in revenge for their father.
Sigarsholm, Sigarsvöll	Old Norse: Sigarsholmr and Sigarsvǫll	Sigarsholm is place where swords are hidden in Helgakvíða Hjörvardssonar and the name means Sigar's island. Sigarsvöll mentioned in the same poem means "Sigar's plain", and is the location where the hero dies in a duel. The second location is also mentioned in Helgakvíða Hundingsbana I as an estate given to the hero when he was born.	The place names are probably symbolical, like other place names in the poem.
Signhildsberg	Old Norse: Sigtún	The derivation is contested but may be cognate with the Celtic toponym Segodunum, from PGmc *siga-tūna ("strong fortress").	Founded by Odin according to the Prose Edda. It also appears in e.g. Hervarar saga, in Heimskringla and Gesta Danorum. It is mentioned in the legend of Hjalmar and Ingeborg in Hervarar saga, but was renamed in honour of another legendary couple, Hagbard and Signy (Signhild) in the 17th c.
Siklings	Old Norse: Siklingar	The dynasty of king Sigar (OE Sighere). The name applied to the house of Sigar suggests a hypocoristic eponym *Sikki (OE *Secca), based on Sig and a k-suffix.	In Skáldskaparmál, in the Prose Edda, its members include both the Geatish king Siggeir and the Danish king Sigar.
Slavs	Old English: Winedas, Old High German: Winida Old Norse: Vindr	The (Western) Slavs were called in PGm *Weneđaz. Of unknown origin; perhaps related to *weniz ("friend").	
Soest	Old Norse: Susat	Soest in Westphalia.	In the Þiðreks saga, Atli's capital is at Soest, which was one of the most important cities in the Hanseatic League in the thirteenth century. It is unclear if the localization in Soest was a feature of north German legend or a creature of the Þiðreks saga.
Sok, Sogn	Old Norse: Sǫk, Old Norse: Sǫgn	An island which in Helgakvíða Hundingsbana I is called Sǫgn, which means "report, but in Völsunga saga called Sǫk, which means "legal action", "instigation".	In Helgakvíða Hundingsbana I, Gudmund^{2} reports that their enemy Helgi has 7000 warriors on the island, but in Völsunga saga, this is reported by his father Granmar.
Solheim	Old Norse: Sólheimr	Sól means "sun", and heimr means "home".	Solheim castle is where the adversary Hothbrodd lives in Helgakvíða Hundingsbana I.
Sparin's Heath	Old Norse: Sparinsheiðr	Sophus Bugge connected the name to Sparta. Sparin is unknown elsewhere. The location appears in Helgakvíða Hundingsbana I.	A location where Hothbrodd and Granmar have allies against Helgi Hundingsbane.
Stave Ness	Old Norse: Stafsnes	Stafn means the "stem of a ship". It appears in Helgakvíða Hundingsbana I.	A location from where allies come with warships to aid Helgi Hundingsbane in his war against Hothbrodd.
Staraya Ladoga	Old Norse: Aldeigja, Old Norse: Aldeigjuborg, Old Norse: Aldogaborg,	Staraya Ladoga is mentioned about 40 times in Old Icelandic literature. Archaeological finds from the mid-8th c. and onwards show that there was a Norse settlement there and that it was a transit point on the route from Sweden to Novgorod (Holmgarðr) where ships were repaired and built. Although, the name Aldeigja is connected to the name of Lake Ladoga, there are several theories about its Finnic origin such as *aaldokas, aallokas ("wavy"), *Alode-joki ("lowland river") or from Olhava, the name of a nearby river. When the Slavs later arrived, they borrowed the name Aldeigja as Ladoga.	In the U version of Hervarar saga, Angantyr's father-in-law is earl there.
Styr Cliffs	Old Norse: Styrkleifar	The word styrr means "tumult", "brawl".	In ''Helgakvíða Hundingsbana II, it is where Helgi Hundingsbane killed Starkad.
Styria	Middle High German: Stîre	A region in modern Austria.	The heroes Biterolf and his son Dietleib are associated with Styria in medieval German epic. Attila grants Biterolf Styria as a fief following Biterolf's excellent service to him, although the hero is originally from Spain. Moritz Haupt and Hermann Schneider both believed that Dietleib was originally a Danish hero, as in the Þiðreks saga, and that Styria (MHG Stîre) might be a south German adaptation of the Stör river in Schleswig-Holstein.
Suebi (Swabians)	Old English: Swǣfas, Middle High German: Swâben, Old Norse: Sváva[r]	From PGmc *swēbaz, from *swē- ("one's own"). The Swabians in modern southern Germany. The name is first attested in Caesar and then attested referring to a number of tribes in northern Germania in Tacitus.	The Swabians are frequently mentioned in German epic, as characters travelling from the Rhine to Hungary or Italy must pass through their territory. Several minor heroes are Swabians. In the Þiðreks saga, the name Svávaland is used to refer to southern Germany in general. Widsith makes the Hundings the neighbors of the Swabians.
Svarin's Hill	Old Norse: Svarinshaugr	The name has been connected to Schwerin. It appears in Helgakvíða Hundingsbana I and in Helgakvíða Hundingsbana II.	It is where the adversary king Granmar lives.
Swedes	Old English: Swēon, Old Norse: svíar, Latin: suiones, Latin: sueones, Latin: suehans	The ethnonym may be derived from *suī and refer to "swine". The Swedes wore helmets decorated with boars. Moreover, the Swedish Yngling dynasty were called descendants of the god Freyr whose animal was the boar. The boar was likely their regal insignia. The boar also represented both Sweden and Freyr iconographically. Another theory, suggests *swe- ("one's own"), meaning "confederates" or "independent", and be related to OHG giswīo (< -swiho) "in-laws". The name may also be derived from a root *swi, as in OHG swīnan, "to ebb out" and be related to water, as in the Swedish body of water Svinnegarn, or from the Proto-Germanic word for "sea", *saiwi.	Located in the Mälaren basin with their tribal centre in Uppsala, where resided the scylfing (Yngling) dynasty. Their realm is believed to have included the provinces Uppland, Södermanland, Västmanland and Närke.
Sweordweras	Old English: Sweordweras	A group of people mentioned in Widsith line 62, and they have the same name as the Suardones of Tacitus, which is derived from a word for "pig skin". In Tacitus' work they belong to seven peoples located in an area often identified as Jutland.	Older scholarship interpreted the name as "men of the sword".

== T–Z ==
Modernized name	Names in medieval languages	Name meaning and/or identification	Notes
Thuringians	Latin: Thuringii, Old English: Þyringas, Middle High German: Düringen	Etymology uncertain, possibly from *þuringoz ("the brave") or related to the Celtic tribal name Teurii, or related to the Germanic Hermanduri tribe. The tribe ruled an independent kingdom until 531 when it was incorporated into Francia.	In the MHG tradition, represented most prominently by Hermanafrid (Irnfrid) and Iring, which is the only clear example of a heroic legend developing within modern Germany. The Thuringians, with Hermanafrid as an exiled margrave, appear among Attila's men in the Nibelungenlied.
Tischcal	Middle High German: Tischcâl	The name may refer to Dijon in Burgundy.	In Wolfdietrich D, Wolfdietrich retires to the monastery of Tischcal, which is under the "Order of Saint George", and becomes a monk. He aids the monastery in fighting off a giant named Tarias. He does penance for his sins and is visited by the souls of all those he has slain. According to the Eckenlied, Wolfdietrich bequeathed the invincible suit of armor of Ortnit to Tischcal, where Queen Seburg of Jochgrimm acquired it and gave it to Ecke. The armor was then taken by Dietrich von Bern after he kills Ecke.
Thor's Ness, Thrasness	Old Norse: Þórsnes, Old Norse: Þrasnes	In Helgakvíða Hundingsbana I called "Thor's Ness", but in Völsunga saga called Thrasness. Þras means "quarrel". In ''Helgakvíða Hundingsbana I, the location of Gnípalundr (Gnipa Grove).	In the Völsunga saga, a location in Granmar's kingdom, where Sinfjötli is said to have been castrated by daughters of jötnar.
Trøndelag	Old Norse: Þrøndr, Old English: Þrōwend	A district whose people mentioned in Old Norse sources and in Widsith line 64.	One scholar identified the people of Widsith with the Treveri of the Moselle valley.
Tronu Strand	Old Norse: Trǫnueyrr	The first element of Trǫnueyrr means "crane", while the second means "gravelly bank".	A location where the hero of Helgakvíða Hundingsbana I has ships in his fleet.
Tronje	Middle High German: Tronege	No clear identification: proposals include a castle Troneck in Hunsrück, Kirchberg in Alsace, Troyes, France, Tournai or Tongeren, Belgium, or Trondheim.	Place of origin of Hagen/Högni^{1} in German tradition. In the Waltharius, explained as deriving from Hagen's descent from the ancient Trojans.
Troy	Middle High German: diu alte Troye or Elsentroye	An ancient city in modern Turkey. The Franks claimed Trojan descent. In medieval German epic, Troye can also refer to Troia, Apulia, hence the use of terms such as "old Troy".	The wild woman Else is the queen of Troy in Wolfdietrich, and it is called "Elsentroye" in Dietrichs Flucht. Hagen/Högni is also sometimes connected to Troy (see Tronje).
Tyrol	Middle High German: Tirol	Region in the Alps in modern Austria bordering Italy.	Dietrich's adventures fighting supernatural beings are frequently set in Tyrol. The dwarf kingdoms of Virginal and Laurin are also located there, as is the mountain Jochgrim from which the giant Ecke is sent out.
Ulleråker	Old Norse: Ullarákr, Latin: Laneo Campo or Latin: Campus Laneus	The legendary location Ullarakr was located near Uppsala, Sweden. The name referred to a hundred district named after the local thing (assembly location), which was some 100m south of the later Uppsala Cathedral. Uller is the genitive form of the theonym Ullr and åker means "field". Since ull can also mean "wool" it has been mistranslated as Laneo Campo "field of wool", see also McTurk's translation (1991). In Gesta Danorum, Saxo appears to have moved Campus Laneus to western Scania.	Mentioned in Heimskringla and in the Lodbrok lay Krákumál, and in the legendary sagas Þorsteins saga Víkingssonar and Hrólfs saga Gautrekssonar.
Varin's Fjord, Varin's Isle	Old Norse: Varinsfjǫrðr and Old Norse: Varinsey	The name Varin is a personal name based on the ethnonym Varini, but the location has been connected with Warnemünde.	In a flyting with his opponent Sinfjötli accuses his opponent Gudmund of having been a witch on Varin's Isle and of having played the female part to him in sexual intercourse. Varin's Fjord appears in Helgakvíða Hundingsbana I as a location where the hero's fleet was moored. It also appears in Helgakvíða Hjǫrvarðssonar as the place where the gýgr Hrimgerd wants to meet the hero.
Veleti	Middle High German: Wilzen, Old Norse: Wilcinaland	A Slavic tribe living between the Elbe and Oder rivers whose name was extended to mean all Polabian Slavs.	References in the poet Der Marner suggest that the Veleti featured in German heroic legend, but stories are only found in the Þiðdrekssaga, where Attila's wife Helche comes from the Veleti. The Veleti kill Ermanaric's son Frederich after Sibeche contrives to have him sent their to demand tribute.
Vendel, Vendsyssel, Vandals	Old English: Wendlas, Wenlas, Old Norse: Vendill	The name Wendlas in Beowulf may refer to the Vandals, the inhabitants of Vendel (see Vendel Period) near Uppsala, in Sweden, or to Vendsyssel in northern Jutland. Neither is it always clear in ON sources, whether Vendil refers to Vendel or Vendsyssel, as in the case of the location of the death of the Swedish king Ohthere, where it appears to have moved from Sweden to Denmark in Icelandic sources.	From PGmc *Wanđilaz, itself from PGmc *wanđaz ("turned, twisted") or from the PGmc root *wanđ- ("water"), presumably because the tribe was originally located near the Limfjord (cf. Old High German: wentilsēo, "sea"), but they were also linked to Vendel, in Sweden.
Vífilsborg	Vífilsborg	It is identified by Nikulás of Þverá as Avenches in Switzerland, whose former German name was "Wuflisburg".	A city raided by Ragnar's sons in the Holy Roman Empire.
Vinbjorg and Valbjorg	Old Norse: Vinbjǫrg and Old Norse: Valbjǫrg	Locations that are given to Gudrun as compensation for the killing of her husband and son, in Völsunga saga, and Guðrúnarkvíða hin forna, but they are otherwise unknown.	
Vistula Woods	Old English: Wistlawudu	The areas around the river Vistula where the formerly were Germanic-speaking populations, see Hreith-Goths, above.	
Vlachs (Romanians)	Middle High German: Walâchen, Middle High German: Vlâchen	A nomadic people in South East Europe, in MHG usage probably identical with the Romanians.	The Vlachs are among Attila's subject peoples in the Nibelungenlied and are described as riding like flying birds. Hornboge and some other heroes are associated with this people.
Völsungs	Old English: Wælsing[as], Old Norse: Vǫlsungar	George Gillespie states that the name is probably based on PGmc *wala- ("selected, beloved"), comparing Gothic walisa ("beloved"). It could also derive from the equivalent of ON völsi ("phallus"), possibly as a name for Odin. There are no clear historical origins for the clan, except that they were probably originally Frankish.	In Norse Tradition, the clan of Sigmund and Sigurd. Sigmund is called a Wælsing in Beowulf.
Vosges	Middle High German: Waskenwalt or Waskenstein, Old Norse: Vaskasteinn	A low mountain range on the border between modern France and Germany. Waskenstein may mean "sharp rock" (Old High German: (h)was, "sharp").	The site of Siegfried's murder in most versions of the Nibelungenlied, as well as of Walther of Aquitaine's battle against Gunther and Hagen in Waltharius and probably in the fragmentary Walther und Hildegund (Walter is called "von Wasgenstein" elsewhere and is being escorted through the "Waskenwalt" in the fragment).
*Walhōz	Old English: Wealh, Walas, Old High German: Walaha, Old Norse: Valir or Vǫlir	A PGmc term (singular Walhaz) designating the Romance or Celtic speakers. Probably borrowed from the Celtic Volcae tribe, and later applied to the Romanized Celts.	In Widsith, the word is used twice to mean "Romans" (Rumwalum and Wala ric) rather than the usual OE meaning of "Celts"; this matches Old High German and Old Norse usage in e.g. "The Battle of Goths and Huns". In Middle High German, used for the Italians.
Warini	Old English: Wærne, Werne	A people mentioned in Widsith lines 25 and 59, and the same people as the Varni of Procopius and probably the same as the Varini of Tacitus, and possibly the Varinnae of Pliny the Elder. They may have lived in the 6th c. between the Elbe and the Saale rivers.	
Wedinghausen Monastery	Old Norse: Wadincúsan	A monastery formerly located near Arnsberg, Westphalia; however, the Þiðreks saga locates it in Lombardy.	Heime goes into a hiding as a monk at the monastery in the Þiðreks saga, defending it from the giant Aspilian; however, after he is recognized by Dietrich von Bern he rejoins Dietrich, burns down the monastery, and kills all the monks.
Wicings	Old English: Wīcingas	A people mentioned in Widsith lines 47 and 59, and identified with the Heaðobards or the people of the Viken region.	The identification has made two scholars identify the Oslo region as the original home of the Heaðobards.
Wilten Monastery	German: Wilten	A monastery near Innsbruck in Tirol.	According to an early modern broadsheet from Wilten Monastery (printed 1601), the hero Heime become a monk and was the founder of the monastery, which he defended against a giant named Thurso and also a dragon. Heime's grave at Wilten had earlier been mentioned by the North German chronicler Albert von Stade in the 13th century.
Withmyrgings	Old English: Wiþmyrgingas	A people mentioned in Widsith line 118, and perhaps the same as the Ongendmyrgings. The element with points to them being located at the River Vid, near Schleswig.	
Woings	Old English: Wōingas	A people mentioned in Widsith line 30, and which is otherwise unknown. Malone suggests Veierland as it was known in Old Nose as Vár or Vóm.	
Wolfdales and Wolf Lake	Old Norse: Ulfdalir and Old Norse: Ulfsjar	The names of the locations mean "Wolfdales" and "Wolf Lake".	In Vǫlundarkvíða, the place where Wayland lived with his brothers, where they met the three Valkyries, and where he stayed waiting for his Hervor until Nidud captured him.
Worms	Middle High German: Wormez, Old Norse: Verniza, Latin: Wormatia	Worms, a city located on the Rhine, founded by the Romans and captured by the Burgundians in 413.	Capital of the Burgundian kingdom in the Middle High German tradition. Although the city was part of the Burgundian kingdom on the Rhine, there is no evidence that it was their capital.
Wrosnan	Old English: Wrosnan	A people mentioned in Widsith line 33, and identified by Malone as those of Vræsen, an island south-east of the Danish island Fyn.	The island Vræsen was depopulated during the Migration period and its inhabitants may have joined the Angles and the Saxons in their migration to England.
Wulfings	Old English: Wylfingas, Old Norse: Ylfingar, Middle High German: Wülfinge	"People of the wolf." In Scandinavian sources, a Geatish dynasty in Östergötland, and it is possible that the Anglo-Saxon Wuffing dynasty is descended from this clan of what is today southern Sweden. Possibly a Geatish dynastic name that was used by the Gothic Amals, or the name could be created from "wolf" independently in Middle High German epic. They are by some authors considered a clan in northern Germany.	In Middle High German epic and the Þiðreks saga, used for the relatives of Hildebrand. In the Völsunga saga, Wulfings is an alternative name for the Völsungs, due to the absorption of the story of Helgi Hundingsbane into that of the Völsungs.
Ymbran	Old English: Ymbran	A people mentioned in Widsith line 32. Perhaps they were the Ambrones and the people of the island of Amrum (formerly Ambrum).	
Ynglings	Old English: Scylfing, Old Norse: Skilfingr and Old Norse: Ynglingr	The name Ynglingr comes from Yngvi, one of the names of the god Freyr, the founder of the dynasty, and Sweden, in Norse mythology. The name Scylfing/Skilfingr is of uncertain meaning. Just like the names of the Danish rulers alliterated with their residence Heorot/Hleiðr, the Geatish rulers with Hreosnaburh, the Yngling rulers' names alliterated with their residence Uppsala.	The Norwegian Fairhair dynasty claimed to be descended from this dynasty.
Xanten	Middle High German: Santen	Xanten in Westphalia.	Siegfried is associated with the city of Xanten in the Nibelungenlied, but not elsewhere, possibly via association of his name ("victory-peace") with saint Viktor of Xanten.

== Sources ==
- Anderson, Carl Edlund (1999). Formation and Resolution of Ideological Contrast in the Early History of Scandinavia (PDF) (Thesis). University of Cambridge.
- Andersson, Martin (August 2012). "Of Regner Lodbrog, Hugh Blair, and Mistranslations". Lovecraft Annual (6): 36–42. JSTOR 26868447.
- Andersson, Thorsten (1996). "Göter, Goter, Gutar" [Geats, Goths, Gutes]. Namn og Bygd (in Swedish). 84: 5–21. ISSN 0077-2704.
- Beck, Heinrich; Geuenich, Dieter; Steuer, Heiko (1995). Reallexikon der germanischen Altertumskunde. Vol. 9 (2 ed.). Walter de Gruyter. ISBN 978-3-11-014642-4.
- Bellows, Henry Adams (1928). The Poetic Edda. Library of Alexandria. ISBN 1465573828.
- Boyer, Régis; Renaud, Jean (2012). Sagas légendaires islandaises. Anacharsis. ISBN 978-2-914777-896.
- Brink, Stefan (2002). "Sociolinguistic Perspectives And Language Contact In Proto-Nordic". In Bandle, Oskar [in German] (ed.). The Nordic Languages. Vol. 1. Walter de Gruyter. pp. 685–690. ISBN 9783110148763.
- Brink, Stefan (2008). "People and Land in Early Scandinavia". In Garipzanov, Ildar H.; Geary, Patrick J.; Urbańczyk, Przemysław (eds.). Franks, Northmen, and Slavs: Identities and State Formation in Early Medieval Europe. Brepols. pp. 89–112. ISBN 978-2-503-52615-7.
- Brinker-von der Heyde, Claudia (1999). "Hagen". In Beck, Heinrich; Geuenich, Dieter; Steuer, Heiko (eds.). Reallexikon der Germanischen Altertumskunde. Vol. 13. New York/Berlin: de Gruyter. doi:10.1515/gao_RGA_2193 (inactive 12 July 2025).
- Byock, Jesse (1999). The Saga of King Hrolf Kraki. Penguin Classics. ISBN 014043593X.
- Byrd, Andrew Miles (2015). The Indo-European Syllable. Brill; Leiden, Boston. ISBN 978-90-04-29254-3.
- Stories and Ballads of the Far Past. Translated by Chadwick, Nora Kershaw. Cambridge at the University Press. 1921.
- Chambers, R. W. (1912). Widsith, a Study in Old English Heroic Poetry. Cambridge: at the University Press.
- Clark Hall, John R. (1916). A Concise Anglo-Saxon Dictionary for the Use of Students (2 ed.). New York, The Macmillan Company.
- Cleasby, Richard; Vigfússon, Gudbrand (1874). An Icelandic-English dictionary. Oxford Clarendon Press.
- Cronan, Dennis (1918). "Eotena, Eotenum 'Jutes' in the Finnsburg Episode in Beowulf". Modern Philology. 116 (1): 1–19. doi:10.1086/697668. S2CID 166023863.
- Ebel, Else (2000). "Hreiðgoten". In Beck, Heinrich (ed.). Reallexikon der germansichen Altertumskunde. Vol. 15 (2 ed.). pp. 153–154.
- "Skaldskaparmal". Snorri Sturluson Edda. Translated by Faulkes, Anthony. Everyman. 1995.
- The Saga of King Heidrek the Wise (PDF). Translated by Finch, R. G. London and Edinburgh: Nelson. 1965.
- Sturluson, Snorri (2016). Heimskringla (PDF). Vol. 1. Translated by Alison, Finlay; Anthony, Faulkes. Viking Society for Northern Research, University College London. ISBN 978-0-903521-86-4.
- Friis-Jensen, Karsten, ed. (2015). Saxo Grammaticus Gesta Danorum, The History of the Danes. Vol. 1. Translated by Fisher, Peter. Oxford University Press. ISBN 978-0-19-82052-34.
- Fulk, R. D. (2018). A Comparative Grammar of the Early Germanic Languages. Amsterdam, Philadelphia: John Benjamins Publishing Company. ISBN 978-90-272-6312-4.
- Gentry, Francis G.; McConnell, Winder; Müller, Ulrich; Wunderlich, Werner, eds. (2011) [2002]. The Nibelungen Tradition. An Encyclopedia. New York, Abingdon: Routledge. ISBN 978-0-8153-1785-2.
- Gillespie, George T. (1973). Catalogue of Persons Named in German Heroic Literature, 700-1600: Including Named Animals and Objects and Ethnic Names. Oxford: Oxford University. ISBN 978-0-19-815718-2.
- Grane, Thomas (2007). The Roman Empire and Southern Scandinavia - a Northern Connection! (Thesis). SAXO-Institute, University of Copenhagen.
- Harrison, Dick (2009). Harrison, Dick (ed.). Sveriges historia. Vol. 2 (1 ed.). Norstedts. ISBN 9789113023779.
- Hellquist, Elof (1922). Svensk etymologisk ordbok. Lund: C.W.K. Gleerups förlag.
- Hermodsson, Lars (1993). Goterna. Ett krigarfolk och dess bibel. Stockholm.
- Clarke, M. G. (1911). Sidelights on Teutonic History During the Migration Period, being Studies of Beowulf and Other Old English Poems. Cambridge University Press.
- Damico, Helen (1984). Beowulf's Wealhtheow and the Valkyrie Tradition. University of Wisconsin Press. ISBN 0-299-09500-2.
- Eggers, M. (2002). "Myrkviðr". In Beck, Heinrich (ed.). Reallexikon der germansichen Altertumskunde. Vol. 20 (2 ed.). Walter de Gruyter. pp. 460–461. ISBN 9783110171648.
- Gruszczyński, Jacek (2019). Viking Silver, Hoards and Containers. Routledge, London and New York. ISBN 9780815373360.
- Gschwantler, Otto (1971). "Zum Namen der Rosomonen und an. Jónakr". Die Sprache. 17 (2): 164–176.
- Gustavson, Helmer (1991). Rökstenen. Riksantikvarieämbetet. ISBN 91-7192-822-7.
- Gwara, Scott (2008). "The Foreign Beowulf and the "Fight at Finnsburh"". In Gentry, Francis G. (ed.). Heroic Identity in the World of Beowulf. Vol. 2. Leiden, Boston: Brill. pp. 135–180. ISBN 978-90-04-17170-1.
- Harris, Joseph C. (2004). "Myth and Literary History: Two Germanic Examples". Oral Tradition. 19: 3–19. doi:10.1353/ort.2004.0090. hdl:10355/64983. S2CID 162591015.
- Heggarty, Paul; Renfrew, Colin (2014). "Europe and the Mediterranean: Languages". In Renfrew, Colin; Bahn, Paul (eds.). The Cambridge World Prehistory. Vol. 3. Cambridge University Press. ISBN 978-1-107-02379-6.
- Hiatt, Alfred (2010). "Beowulf off the map". Anglo-Saxon England. 38. Cambridge University Press: 11–40. doi:10.1017/S026367510999010X. JSTOR 44938015. S2CID 162848558.
- The Poetic Edda. Translated by Hollander, Lee M. Texas University Press. 1928.
- Iversen, Frode (2020). "4 Between Tribe and Kingdom–People, Land, and Law in Scandza AD 500–1350". In Skre, Dagfinn (ed.). Rulership in 1st to 14th century Scandinavia. De Gruyter 2020. pp. 245–304. doi:10.1515/9783110421101-004. ISBN 9783110421101. S2CID 213596339.
- Jackson, Tatjana N. (2009). "Aldeigjuborg of the sagas in the light of archaeological data". Á austrvega. Saga and East Scandinavia. Preprint papers of the 14th International Saga Conference Uppsala, 9th–15th August 2009. 1: 438–442.
- Jansson, Sven B.F. (1987). Runes in Sweden. Kungl. Vitterhetsakademien. ISBN 9789178440672.
- Jones, Gwyn (1969). A History of the Vikings. Oxford University Press.
- Kaufmann, Hennig (1968). Ergänzungsband zu Ernst Förstemann: Personennamen. Wilhelm Fink.
- Klaeber, Friedrich (2008). Fulk, R.D.; Bjork, Robert E.; Niles, John D. (eds.). Klaeber's Beowulf and The Fight at Finnsburg. University of Toronto Press. pp. 274–277. ISBN 978-0-8020-9843-6.
- Klein, Ernest (1966). A Comprehensive Etymological Dictionary of the English Language. Vol. 1 A-K. Elsevier Publishing Company, Amsterdam, London, New York.
- Koch, John T. (2020). Celto-Germanic, Later Prehistory and Post-Proto-Indo-European vocabulary in the North and West (PDF). Aberystwyth: Canolfan Uwchefrydiau Cymreig a Cheltaidd Prifysgol Cymru University of Wales Centre for Advanced Welsh and Celtic Studies.
- Kurzjurin, V.C.; Jarošenko, A.A. (2019). "The Viking Activities in the East and Their Role in The Foundation of The Kievan Rus" (PDF). In Maksimuk, L.M.; Povch, I.V.; Predko, T.I.; Kalilec, L.M; Kovalenko, O.N.; Levonjuk, L.E.; Milač, S.V.; Poleva, I.A. (eds.). Foreign Languages and Contemporary World. Brest State University. pp. 154–156.
- Larsson, Mats G. (2004). "Götarnas riken". Upptäcktsfärder till Sveriges enande. Atlantis, Stockholm. pp. 179–170. ISBN 9789173535182.
- Lawrence, William Witherle (1915). "Beowulf and the Tragedy of Finnsburg". PMLA. 30 (2): 372–431. doi:10.2307/457101. JSTOR 457101.
- Lienert, Elisabeth (2015). Mittelhochdeutsche Heldenepik. Berlin: Erich Schmidt. ISBN 978-3-503-15573-6.
- Lindow, John (2001). Handbook of Norse Mythology. Handbooks of World Mythology. ABC-CLIO, Inc. ISBN 1-57607-217-7.
- Mägi, Marika (2018). "The Historical Reality: Places, Place Names, and Ethnonyms in Written Sources". In Sigurðsson, Jón Viðar; Gorecki, Piotr; Murdoch, Steve; Heß, Cordelia; Pedersen, Anne (eds.). In Austrvegr: The Role of the Eastern Baltic in Viking Age Communication across the Baltic Sea. Vol. 84. Brill. pp. 141–216. ISBN 9789004363816.
- De Gamle Eddadigte. Translated by Jónsson, Finnur. G. E. C. Gats forlag, København. 1932.
- Malone, Kemp (1926). "Agelmund and Lamicho". The American Journal of Philology. 47 (4): 319–346. doi:10.2307/289994. JSTOR 289994.
- Malone, Kemp (1953). "Royal Names in Old English Poetry". Names. 1 (3): 153–162. doi:10.1179/nam.1953.1.3.153.
- Malone, Kemp (1962). Widsith. Rosenkilde and Bagger, Copenhagen.
- McTurk, Rory (1991). Studies in Ragnars saga Loðbrókar and its Major Scandinavian Analogues. The Society for the Study of Mediæval Languages and Literature, Oxford. ISBN 0-907570-08-9.
- McTurk, Rory W. (2006). "Kings and Kingship in Viking Northumbria" (PDF). In McKinnell, John S.; Ashurst, David; Kick, Donata (eds.). The Fantastic in Old Norse Icelandic Literature, Preprint Papers of the 13th International Saga Conference, Durham and York 6th-12th August 2006. Vol. 2. pp. 681–688.
- Much, Rudolf (1919). "Der germanische Osten in der Heldensage" (PDF). 57: 145–176.
- Nedoma, Robert; Anton, Hans H. (1998). "Gibichungen". In Beck, Heinrich; Geuenich, Dieter; Steuer, Heiko (eds.). Reallexikon der Germanischen Altertumskunde. Vol. 12. New York/Berlin: de Gruyter. pp. 66–69. doi:10.1515/gao_RGA_19403 (inactive 12 July 2025).
- Neidorf, Leonard (2013b). "The Dating of Widsið and the Study of Germanic Antiquity". Neophilologus. 97 (1): 165–183. doi:10.1007/s11061-012-9308-2. S2CID 163940868.
- Neidorf, Leonard (2018a). "Beowulf as Pre-National Epic: Ethnocentrism in the Poem and its Criticism". ELH. 85 (4): 847–875. doi:10.1353/elh.2018.0031. S2CID 165792664.
- Neidorf, Leonard (2021). "The Gepids in Beowulf". ANQ: A Quarterly Journal of Short Articles, Notes and Reviews. 3 (1): 3–6. doi:10.1080/0895769X.2019.1584028. S2CID 166373368.
- Neumann, Günter; Castritius, Helmut (2010) [2003]. "Rosomonen". Germanische Altertumskunde Online. de Gruyter.
- Nerman, Birger (1925). Svenska rikets uppkomst. Stockholm: Generalstabens litografiska anstalt.
- Newton, Sam (1993). The Origins of Beowulf and the Pre-Viking Kingdom of East Anglia. Cambridge University Press. ISBN 9780859914727.
- Niles, John (2007). "Anglo-Saxon Heroic Geography: How (on Earth) Can It be Mapped?". Old English Heroic Poems and the Social Life of Texts. Brepolis. pp. 119–140.
- Orchard, Andy (2003). A Critical Companion to Beowulf. D. S. Brewer, Cambridge. ISBN 0-85991-766-5.
- Orel, Vladimir E. (2003). A Handbook of Germanic Etymology. Brill. ISBN 978-90-04-12875-0.
- Paff, William J. (1959). The Geographical and Ethnic Names in the Þíðriks Saga: A Study in Germanic Heroic Legend. Mouton & co.
- Peel, Christine (2015). Guta Lag and Guta Saga, the Law and History of the Gotlanders. Medieval Nordic Laws. Routledge, London and New York. ISBN 978-1-138-80421-0.
- Peterson, Lena (2007). Nordiskt runnamnslexikon. Uppsala: Institutet för språk och folkminnen.
- Pritsak, Omeljan (1981). The origin of Rus'. Harvard University Press. pp. 188–225.
- Pritsak, Omeljan (1993). "Hlǫðskviða". In Pulsiano, Phillip; Wolf, Kirsten (eds.). Medieval Scandinavia, and encyclopedia. Garland Publishing, inc. New York & London. pp. 286–287. ISBN 9780824047870.
- Krause, Arnulf (2010). Reclams Lexikon der germanischen Mythologie und Heldensage. Reclam. ISBN 978-3-15-010778-2.
- Peterson, Lena (2004). Lexikon över urnordiska personnamn. Uppsala: Institutet för språk och folkminnen.
- Rahmqvist, Sigurd (2000). "Gamla Uppsala during the Middle Ages". Myth, Might, and Man. Ten essays on Gamla Uppsala. Riksantikvarieämbetets förlag. pp. 47–49. ISBN 91-7209-190-8.
- Reichert, Hermann (1998). "Runeninschrift als Quellen der Heldensagenforschung". In Düwel, Klaus; Nowak, Sean (eds.). Runeninschriften als Quellen interdisziplinärer Forschung: Abhandlungen des Vierten Internationalen Symposiums über Runen und Runeninschriften in Göttingen vom 4-9 August 1995. Walter de Gruyter. pp. 66–102. ISBN 3110154552.
- Reichert, Hermann (1994). "Heime in Wilten und in der Thidrekssaga". In Uecker, Heiko (ed.). Studien zum Altgermanischen. Festschrift für Heinrich Beck. Walter de Gruyter. pp. 503–512.
- Reichert, Hermann (1996). "Þiðreks saga und oberdeutsche Heldensage". In Kramarz-Bein, Susanne (ed.). Hansische Literaturbeziehungen: Das Beispiel der Þiðreks saga und verwandter Literatur. Berlin, New York: Walter de Gruyter. pp. 236–265.
- Rübekeil, Ludwig (2002). "Scandinavia In The Light of Ancient Tradition". In Bandle, Oskar [in German] (ed.). The Nordic Languages. Vol. 1. Walter de Gruyter. pp. 593–604. ISBN 9783110148763.
- Rübekeil, Ludwig (2017). "The dialectology of Germanic". In Klein, Jared; Joseph, Brian; Fritz, Matthias (eds.). Handbook of comparative and historical Indo-European linguistics (PDF). Berlin, Boston: De Gruyter. pp. 986–1002.
- Schneider, Hermann (1934). Germanische Heldensage, Bd. 2,2: Englische Heldensage - festländische Heldensage in nordgermanischer und englischer Überlieferung - verlorene Heldensage. de Gruyter.
- Schneider, Hermann (1962). Germanische Heldensage, Bd. 1: Deutsche Heldensage (2 ed.). de Gruyter.
- Shippey, Tom (2008). "The Case of Beowulf". Indo-European Studies (26): 223–239.
- Shippey, Tom (2014). "Names in Beowulf and Anglo-Saxon England". In Neidorf, Leonard (ed.). The Dating of Beowulf, a Reassessment. D. S. Brewer, Cambridge. pp. 58–78. ISBN 978-1-84384-387-0.
- Simek, Rudolf (1993). Dictionary of Northern Mythology. Translated by Hall; Angela. D. S. Brewer. ISBN 0-85991-369-4.
- Skre, Dagfinn (2019). "Rulership and Ruler's Sites in 1st–10th-century Scandinavia". Ergänzungsbände zumReallexikon derGermanischen Altertumskunde. Vol. 114. Walter de Gruyter. pp. 193–243. doi:10.1515/9783110421101-003. hdl:10852/83806. ISBN 978-3-11-042579-6. S2CID 213950135.
- Ståhl, Harry (1976). Ortnamn och ortnamnsforskning. AWE/GEBERS. p. 130. ISBN 91-20-04466-6.
- Staver, Ruth Johnston (2005). A companion to Beowulf. Greenwood Publishing Group, Inc. ISBN 0-313-33224-X.
- Strid, Jan Paul (2011). "Retracing the Goths". In Kaliff, Anders; Munkhammar, Lars (eds.). Wulfila 311-2011 (PDF). Acta Universitatis Upsaliensis. pp. 41–54. ISBN 9789155486648. Archived from the original (PDF) on March 5, 2020.
- Sundqvist, Olof (2002). Freyr's offspring, Rulers and religion in ancient Svea society. Uppsala universitet. ISBN 91-554-5263-9.
- Beowulf. Translated by Swanton, Michael. Manchester and New York: Manchester University Press. 1997. ISBN 9780719051463.
- The Saga of King Heidrek the Wise (PDF). Translated by Tolkien, Christopher. 1960.
- Uecker, Heiko (1972). Germanische Heldensage. Stuttgart: Metzler. ISBN 3476101061.
- de Vries, Jan (1962). Altnordisches Etymologisches Worterbuch (1977 ed.). Brill. ISBN 978-90-04-05436-3.
- de Vries, Jan (1962). Altnordisches Etymologisches Worterbuch (2000 ed.). Brill. ISBN 90-04-05436-7.
- The Sagas of Ragnar Lodbrok. Translated by Waggoner, Ben. Troth Publications. 1960.
- Wahlberg, Mats (2003). Svenskt ortnamnslexikon. Uppsala: Institutet för språk och folkminnen.
- Waßenhoven, Dominik (2008). ""Dort ist die Mitte der Welt". Ein isländischer Pilgerführer des 12. Jahrhunderts". In Rexroth, Frank; Huschner, Wolfgang (eds.). Gestiftete Zukunft im mittelalterlichen Europa. Festschrift für Michael Borgolte zum 60. Geburtstag. Akademie Verlag. doi:10.1515/9783050049823-003 (inactive 12 July 2025).
- Wessén, Elias (1927). "Eddadikterna om Helge Hundingsbane". Fornvännen.
- Wessén, Elias (1952). Wessén, Elias; Helgason, Jón; Knudsen, Trygve; Skautrup, Peter (eds.). Ynglingsaga. Svenska bokförlaget Norstedts, Stockholm; Ejnar Munksgaard, København; Dreyers forlag, Oslo.
- Wolfram, Herwig (2004). "Origo gentis: The Literature of German Origins". In Murdoch, Brian; Read, Malcolm; Fritz (eds.). Early Germanic Literature and Culture. Camden House. pp. 39–54. ISBN 157113199X.
