= Ringsjön =

Lake in Sweden

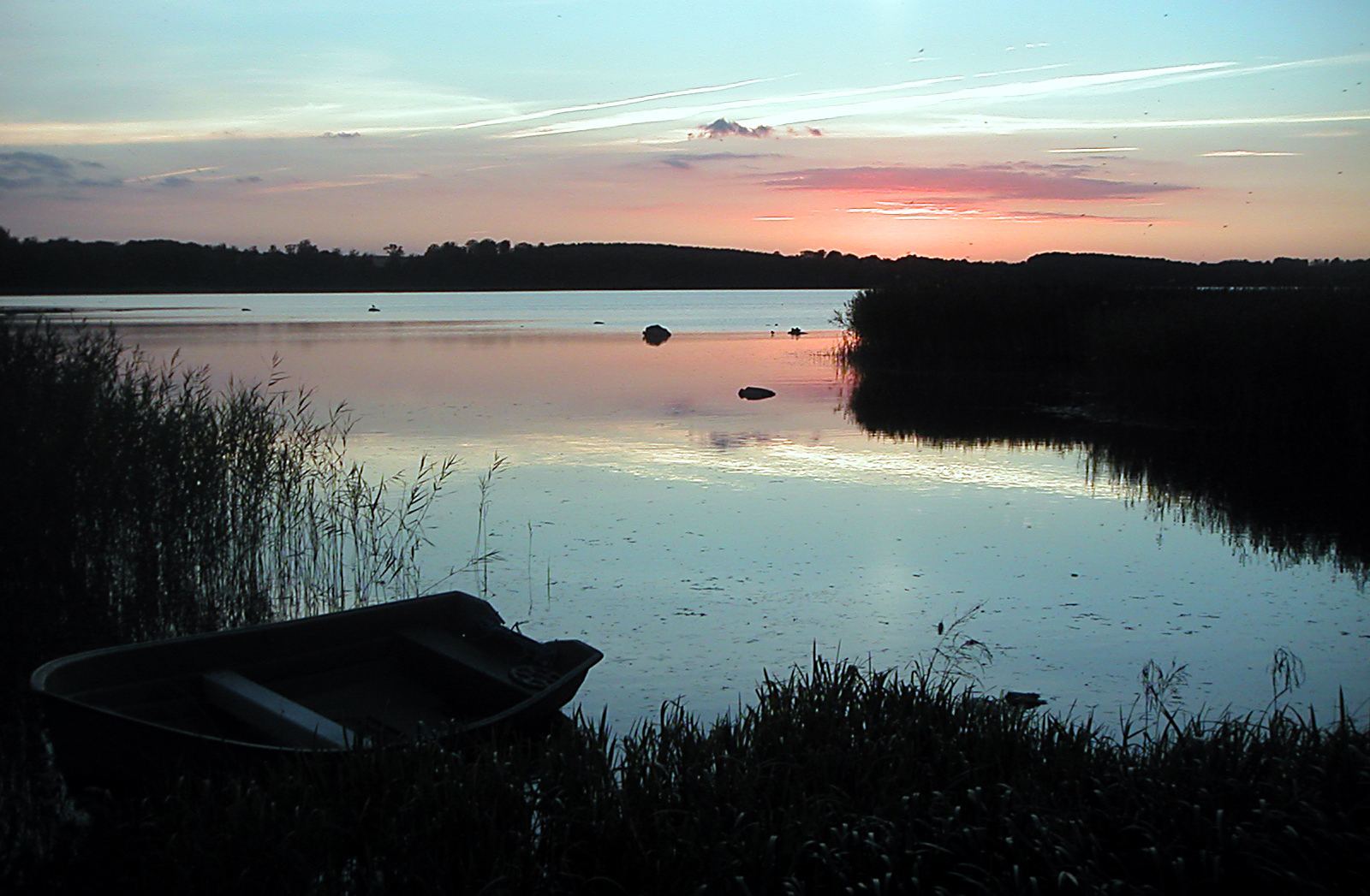
- Sunset over Ringsjön

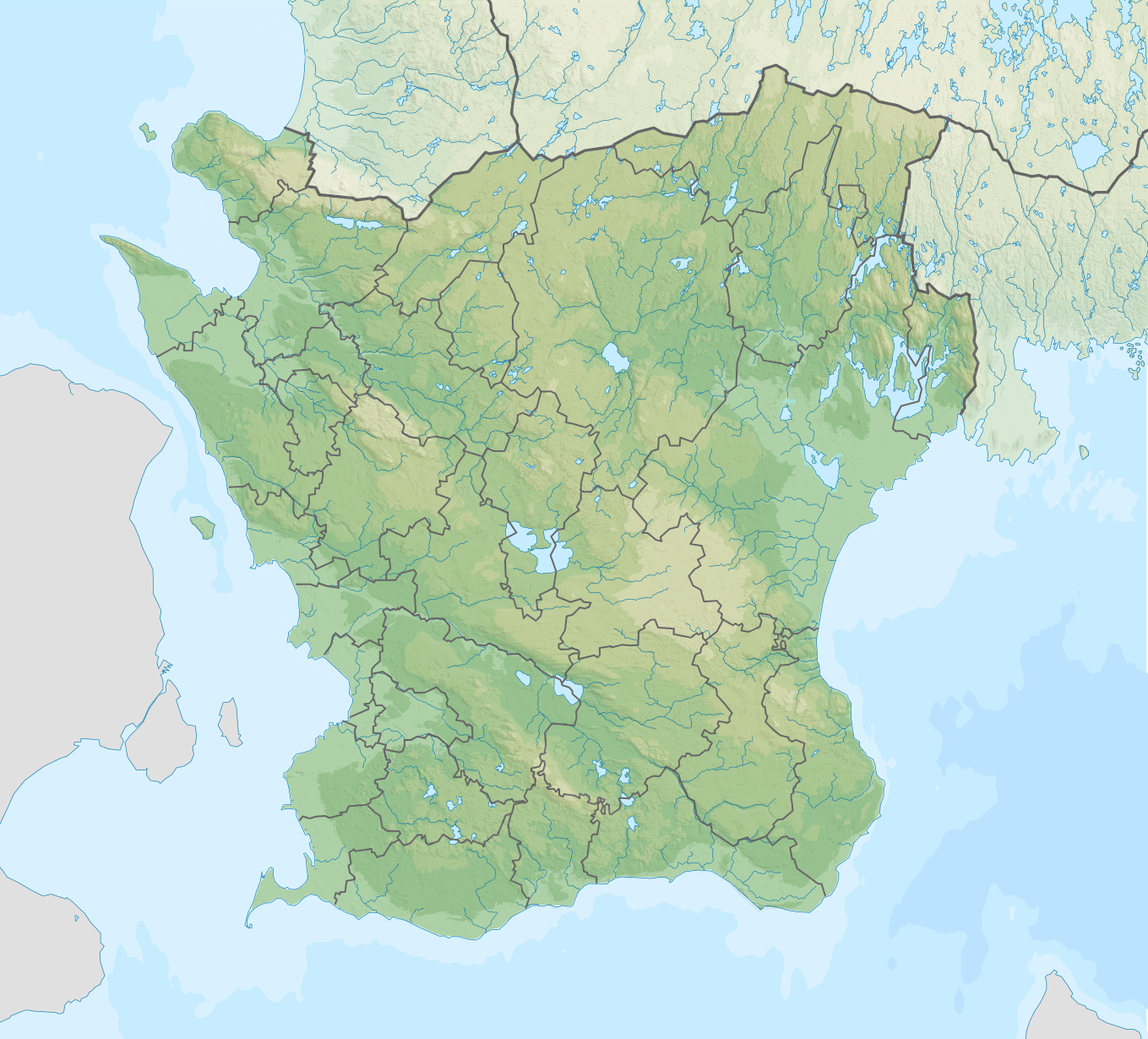
- Location within Skåne Location within Sweden
- Location: Skåne County, Sweden
- Coordinates: 55.862°N 13.54°E

Ringsjön is a lake situated in the middle of Skåne County, Sweden. At 41 square kilometres (10,100 acres), it is the second largest lake in the county. The western and eastern parts of the lake, called Västra Ringsjön and Östra Ringsjön respectively, are separated by a headland. Västra Ringsjön has a depth of 6 metres (20 ft) at its deepest known point, while Östra Ringsjön has a depth of 17 metres (56 ft).

Ringsjön provides drinking water for the inhabitants of Skåne if the water tunnel connected to the lake Bolmen would cease to work. This happened in 2009, when the tunnel was almost completely blocked after a collapse.

Fish species found in Ringsjön are European perch, carp bream, moderlieschen, northern pike, zander, common carp, burbot, common roach, rainbow trout, crucian carp, common rudd, common whitefish, tench, eel, and brown trout. Ringsjön has had an overpopulation of carp bream and common roach for a long time, leading to an increased algal bloom, and in 2005 work began on removing 80% of these species from the lake.

Many cranes make stopovers in Ringsjön on their migration to the northern parts of Sweden. They usually arrive to the lake at the end of March, but have been seen as early as 2 March.

In the winter, Ringsjön is a popular place for ice yachting because of its smooth ice, and the lake gets visitors from all over Europe. The European Championships in ice yachting were held on Ringsjön in 2006. A biking competition, titled Ringsjön Runt (English: Around Ringsjön), is held annually by the lake. It attracts an average of 4000–5000 cyclists, and has been held for over forty years. The course consists of four laps around Ringsjön; one lap is 3.5 Scandinavian miles (35 km) long.

Bosjökloster Castle is located on the shore of Ringsjön in Höör Municipality.
