= Bolmen Water Tunnel =

Water supply tunnel in Sweden

The Bolmen Water Tunnel (Swedish: Bolmentunneln) is a water supply tunnel, 82 km (51 mi) long. It goes from the lake Bolmen in Kronoberg County to the province of Skåne, all in Sweden, and it serves around 700,000 people with drinking water. It has a cross section area of 9 m^{2}, a diameter of more than 3 m. About 2 m³/s is transported through the tunnel, although the capacity is 6 m³/s. The tunnel was built during the period 1975 to 1987.

== Background ==
The tunnel was built because of the foreseen lack of tap water because of the growth of the population in the province of Scania in the 1960s and the high calcium level of the local water. That water was groundwater or came from the lakes of Ringsjön and Vombsjön. The construction took more time and money than planned, partly because of unexpectedly bad rock quality.
