= Ludwig Rübekeil =

German philologist (born 1958)

- Born: 1958 (age 67–68)

Academic background
- Education: University of Freiburg

Academic work
- Discipline: Germanic philology
- Institutions: University of Bamberg; University of Zurich

Ludwig Rübekeil (born 1958) is a German philologist who is Professor of Germanic philology at the University of Zurich.

== Biography ==
Ludwig Rübekeil enrolled at the Pädagogische Hochschule Weingarten in 1977, from which he graduated with a degree in German, Art and Education in 1981. From 1981 he studied Germanic philology, Indo-European studies and Scandinavian studies at the University of Freiburg, from which he earned his PhD in 1990. From 1992 to 1994, he taught German at the University of Bamberg under Rolf Bergmann. In 1995 Rübekeil became a lecturer on Germanic philology at the University of Zurich, where he has since become a professor.

== Selected works ==
- Suebica. Völkernamen und Ethnos, 1992
- Diachrone Studien zur Kontaktzone zwischen Kelten und Germanen, 2002
