= Hjalmar and Ingeborg =

Swedish legendary duo

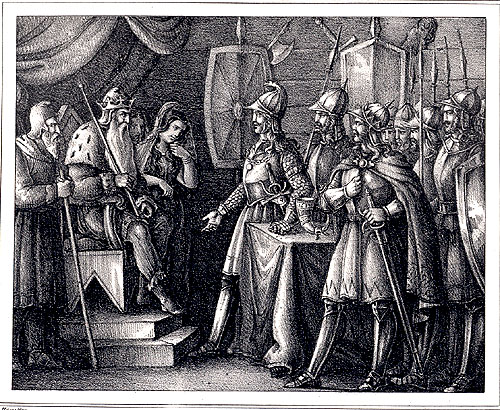
Hjalmar proposes to Ingeborg

Hjalmar (Swedish pronunciation: [ˈjǎlmar]) and Ingeborg (Swedish: [ˈɪ̂ŋːɛˌbɔrj]) were a legendary Swedish duo. The male protagonist Hjalmar and his duel for Ingeborg features in the Hervarar saga and in Orvar-Odd's saga, as well as in Gesta Danorum, Lay of Hyndla and a number of Faroese ballads. Hjalmar never lost a battle until meeting a berserker wielding the cursed sword Tyrfing.

== A tale of two heroes ==
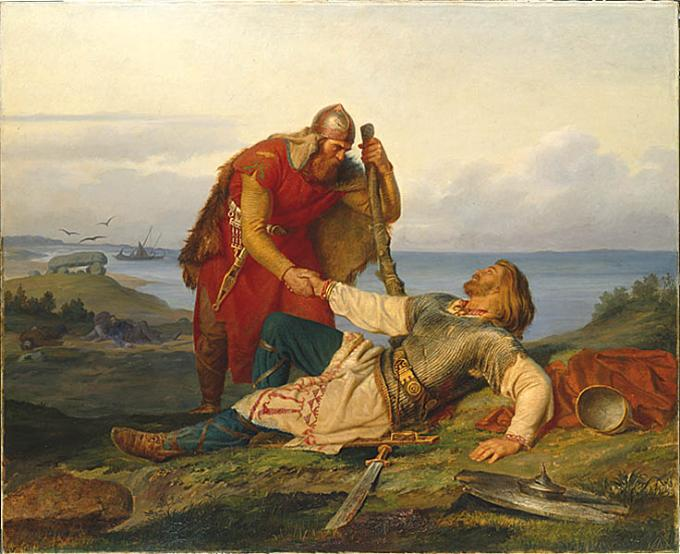
Orvar-Odd and Hjalmar bid each other farewell, by Mårten Eskil Winge (1866).

Hjalmar was one of the mythical Swedish king Yngvi's housecarls at Uppsala. He and princess Ingeborg were in love, but the king refused Hjalmar's requests to marry her; believing there were suitors with a better pedigree than him.

Hjalmar's reputation as a courageous and valiant warrior was great and it reached the most remote parts of Norway, where the Norwegian hero Orvar-Odd felt a desire to test his fighting skills with Hjalmar. Thus Orvar-Odd sailed to Sweden with five ships and met Hjalmar who had fifteen ships. Hjalmar could not accept such an uneven balance of strength and sent away ten of his own ships so that the forces would be even. The two warriors fought ferociously for two days but the battle remained a draw. Finally, they realized that they were equals and decided to become blood brothers by letting their blood flow under a strand of turf raised by a spear. Then the strand of turf was put back during oaths and incantations. Orvar-Odd accompanied Hjalmar back to Uppsala, where he soon discovered the feelings between Hjalmar and Ingeborg. Orvar-Odd offered to help Hjalmar elope with Ingeborg, but Hjalmar declined and suffered patiently until a suitor arrived that Hjalmar could not tolerate.

== The sons of Arngrim ==
Further south, on Bolmsö, lived the feared berserker Arngrim and his twelve sons. They were all infamous berserkers who spread fear and destruction throughout the North. The eldest was a head taller than the rest and his name was Angantyr, and it was to him that Arngrim had entrusted the sword Tyrfing, which had been cursed by its makers, the Dwarves Dvalinn and Durin. This sword would cause three evil deeds and one man had to die every time it was unsheathed. (Note: The fantastical legend of the sword Tyrfing and its dwarfen make is found at the beginning of the later H text of Hervarar saga ok Heiðreks, but lacking in the older R text. The R text contains more detail on Hjalmar's death duel at Samsø. (Kershaw 1921). In Örvar-Odds saga, Angantyr does mention his Tyrfingr was forged by dwarfs (Edwards & Pálsson 1970, p. 43;"Tyrfingr heitir, er dvergar hafa smidat", Boer ed., p.100)) The next eldest was Hjorvard and one Yule, when everyone was at home and bragged about what they would accomplish the following year, Hjorvard declared that he was to marry princess Ingeborg at Uppsala.

== The proposal ==
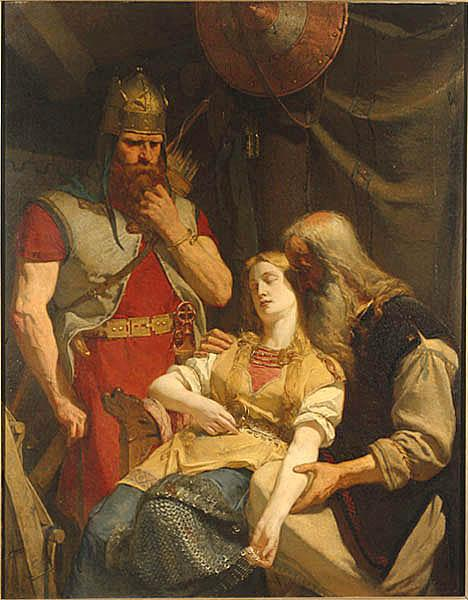
"Orvar Odd informs Ingeborg about Hjalmar's death" (1859) by August Malmström.

In the spring, the twelve brothers arrived at Uppsala and Hjorvard asked for Ingeborg's hand, but this was something Hjalmar would not tolerate. Hjalmar stepped forth and said that he deserved the princess more than a strange berserker. The king who was uncomfortable with having twelve infamous berserkers in his hall declared that he could not possibly choose between two so great men, and thus he preferred to let Ingeborg make the choice herself. Naturally, Ingeborg chose Hjalmar and this vexed Hjorvard who challenged the happy Hjalmar to a duel on Samsø, and reminded that Hjalmar would be niðingr if he did not turn up.

== The duel on Samsø ==
On the designated day, Hjalmar and Orvar-Odd arrived to Munarvágr on Samsø, and immediately stepped ashore to search for their adversaries. They soon found the scattered and gory remains of the crewmen, who had been slaughtered by the twelve berserkers. Orvar-Odd immediately went to the forest and cut himself a huge club (according to Saxo, he took a rudder), whereupon the two companions continued their search for the twelve brothers.

The decision was that one of the pair would fight Angantyr who wielded the sword Tyrfing, leaving the other to contend with the other eleven berserkers including the rival suitor Hjorvard. Orvar-Odd wore a silken (or silver) shirt (Old Norse: skyrta) which nothing could pierce, thus offered to take on Angantyr, but Hjalmar would hear none of it, accusing his sworn brother of taking away the better part of the glory. (Note: Hervarar saga ok Heiðreks (H text) has Odd saying "I will fight against Angantyr.. I have more faith in the protection of my shirt than in that of your-mail coat" to which Hjalmar objects (Kershaw 1921, Appendix I, pp.144-)) The variant description in Odd's saga is as follows: Angantyr reckons himself equal to three of his brothers when armed with his sword, forged by dwarfs and which will "bite anything, even iron or rock." Hjalmar is eager to fight him nevertheless, thinking that his four-ringed mailcoat will afford him sufficient protection, even though Odd warns against the folly of it.

Orvar-Odd quickly defeated Hjorvard and ten of the brothers, and started to look for Hjalmar. He found Angantyr dead, but Hjalmar was lethally wounded by Tyrfing. In his dying breath, Hjalmar composed a poem which was meant to be communicated to his beloved princess Ingeborg back in Uppsala.

== Hjalmar's death song ==
The composed poem, commonly known as "Hjalmar's death song" is found inserted in the older text of Hervarar saga ok Heiðreks as well as in Örvar-Odds saga, though the texts diverge considerably. In German it has been dubbed Hiálmars Sterbelied, and classed by Andreas Heusler as one of the so-called Eddica minora.

== Aftermath ==
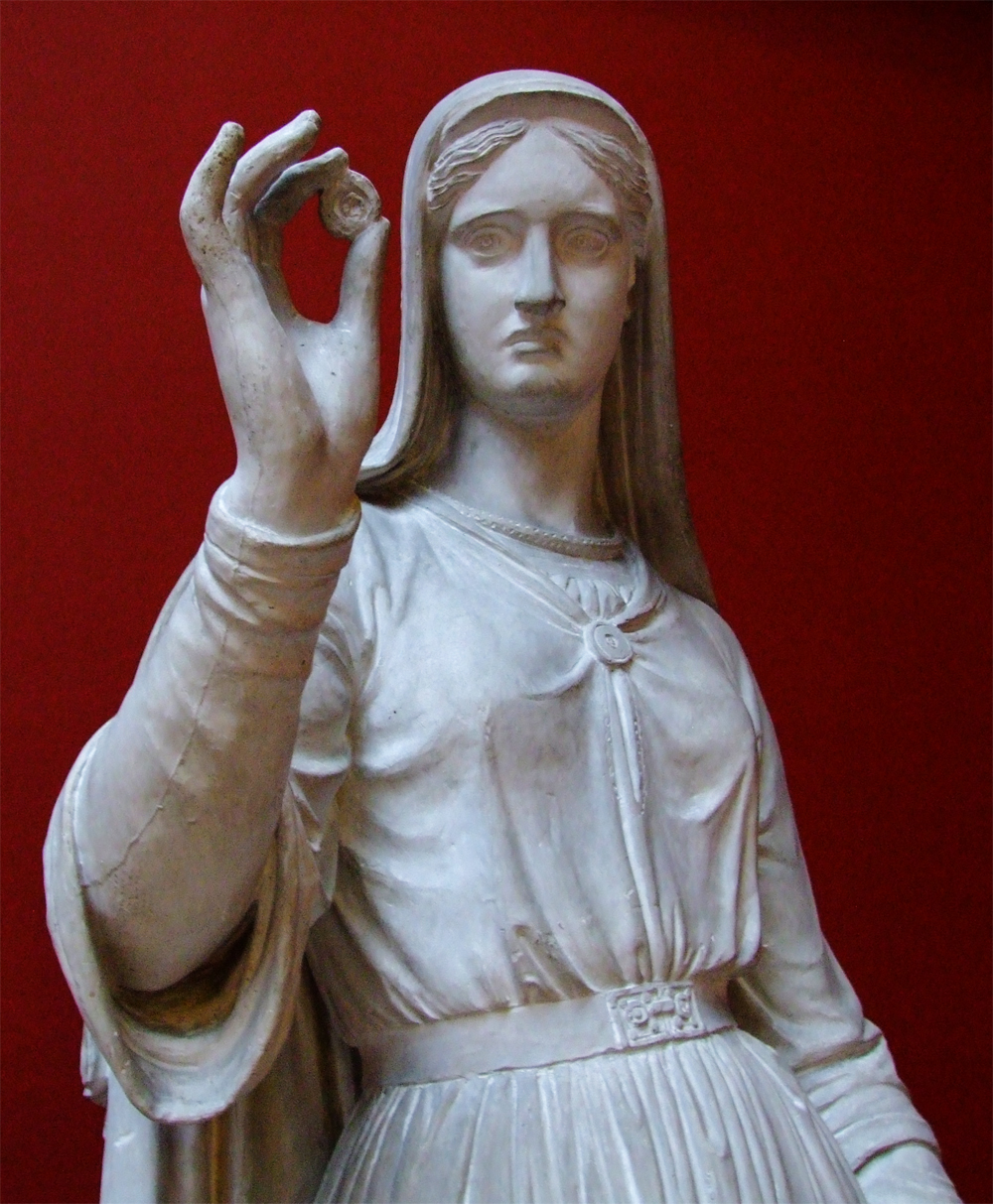
"Ingeborg" (1857) by Herman Wilhelm Bissen.

Orvar-Odd buried all the slain men in barrows and Tyrfing. The agreement made beforehand that the slain would be given dignified burial together with their slain arms, Hjalmar with his mail-shirt, Angantyr with Tyrfing, and Odd too, had he been killed, with his shirt of protection and arrows (presumably the magic arrows named Gusir's Gifts). Perhaps it was so as to ensure that it would not cause a second and third malicious deed, after Hjalmar's death. Then he sailed alone back to Uppsala with Hjalmar's corpse. Odd remembers in his own death-poem that he piggybacked Hjalmar's corpse to Sigtuna in Uppsala. When Ingeborg learned of Hjalmar's death, she fell dead also. The two lovers were buried in the same barrow.

Tyrfing would not remain buried. For its continued adventures, see Hervor.
