= Bolmsö =

Island in Sweden

Coordinates: 56°57′43″N 13°44′01″E

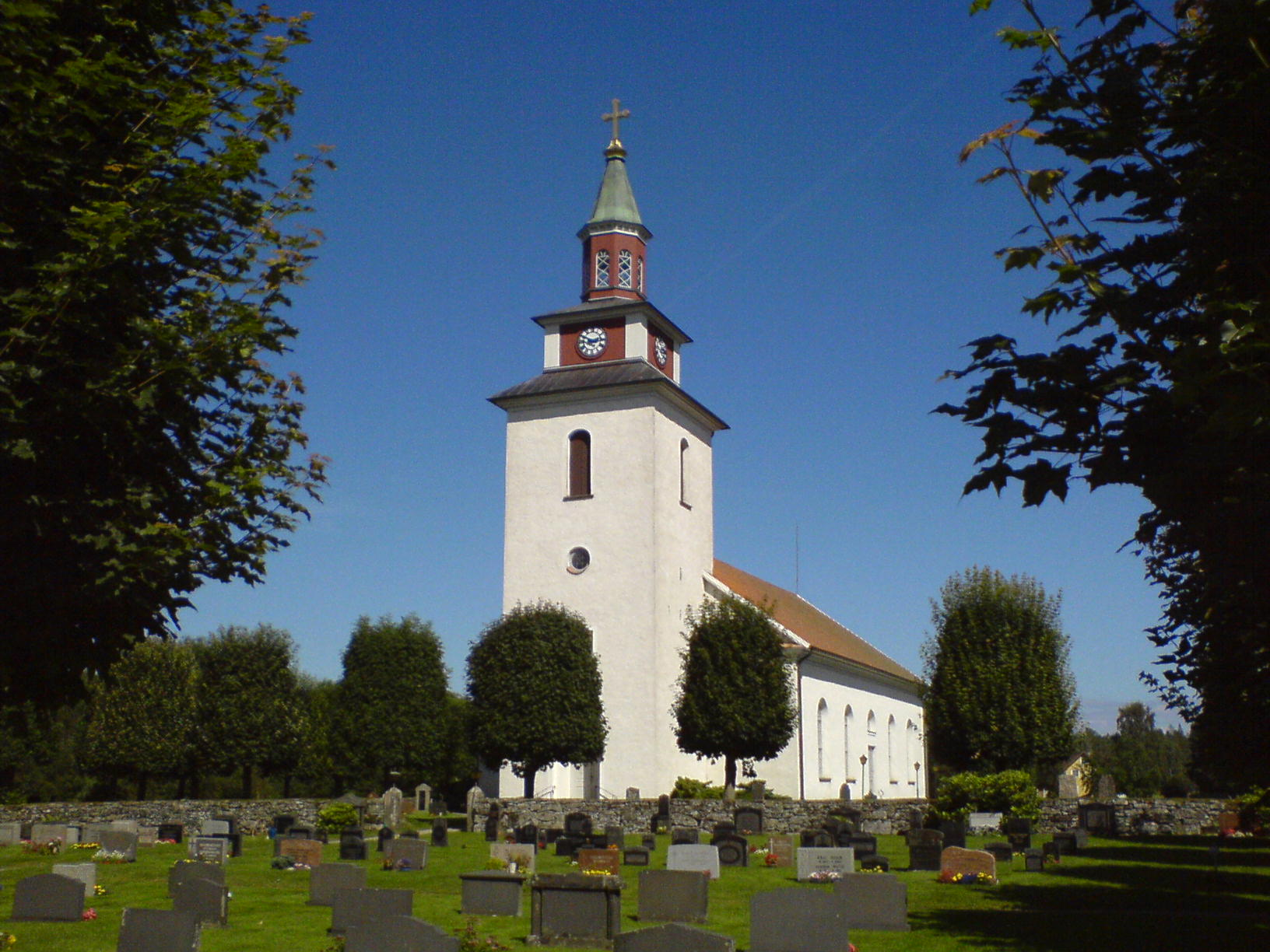
Bolmsö Church.

Bolmsö is an island located in lake Bolmen near Växjö in Småland. It had 382 inhabitants in 1998.

== History ==
It presents 530 ancient remains, including dolmens and cobble-clad graves in various forms, especially large triangular ones. The dominating graves are large barrows from the Iron Age with the addition of stelae, stone circles and a large stone ship. A farm with the name Hof reveals that it was once a pagan blót temple (see Temple at Uppsala).

In the Hervarar saga, it is related that Arngrim and his twelve wild sons, who fought against Hjalmar, lived on Bólmr and it is believed to refer to Bolmsö. The identification is supported by Saxo Grammaticus who described Arngrim as a Swedish berserker. Although, according to the later versions, H and U, of Hervarar saga, it was the island Bolm in Hålogaland. This might be due to a confusion between a name of an island in Hålogaland and the lake Bolmen.

== Sources ==
- Nationalencyklopedin
