= Munarvágr =

Location on the southern shore of Samsø

Munarvágr was a location on the southern shore of Samsø, which is mentioned in the legendary sagas Hervarar saga and Ragnar Lodbrok's saga.

In the Hervarar saga, it is where Hjalmar and Orvar-Odd fought Angantyr and his brothers, the sons of Arngrim. Later, Angantyr's daughter Hervor steps ashore in her quest to claim the enchanted sword Tyrfing from the barrow-wight of her own father.

In an epilogue to the Ragnar Lodbrok's saga, some men find a wooden idol, 40 ells high, which chants to them that it had been raised by the sons of Ragnar Lodbrok.
