= Bolmen =

Lake in Kronoberg County, Sweden

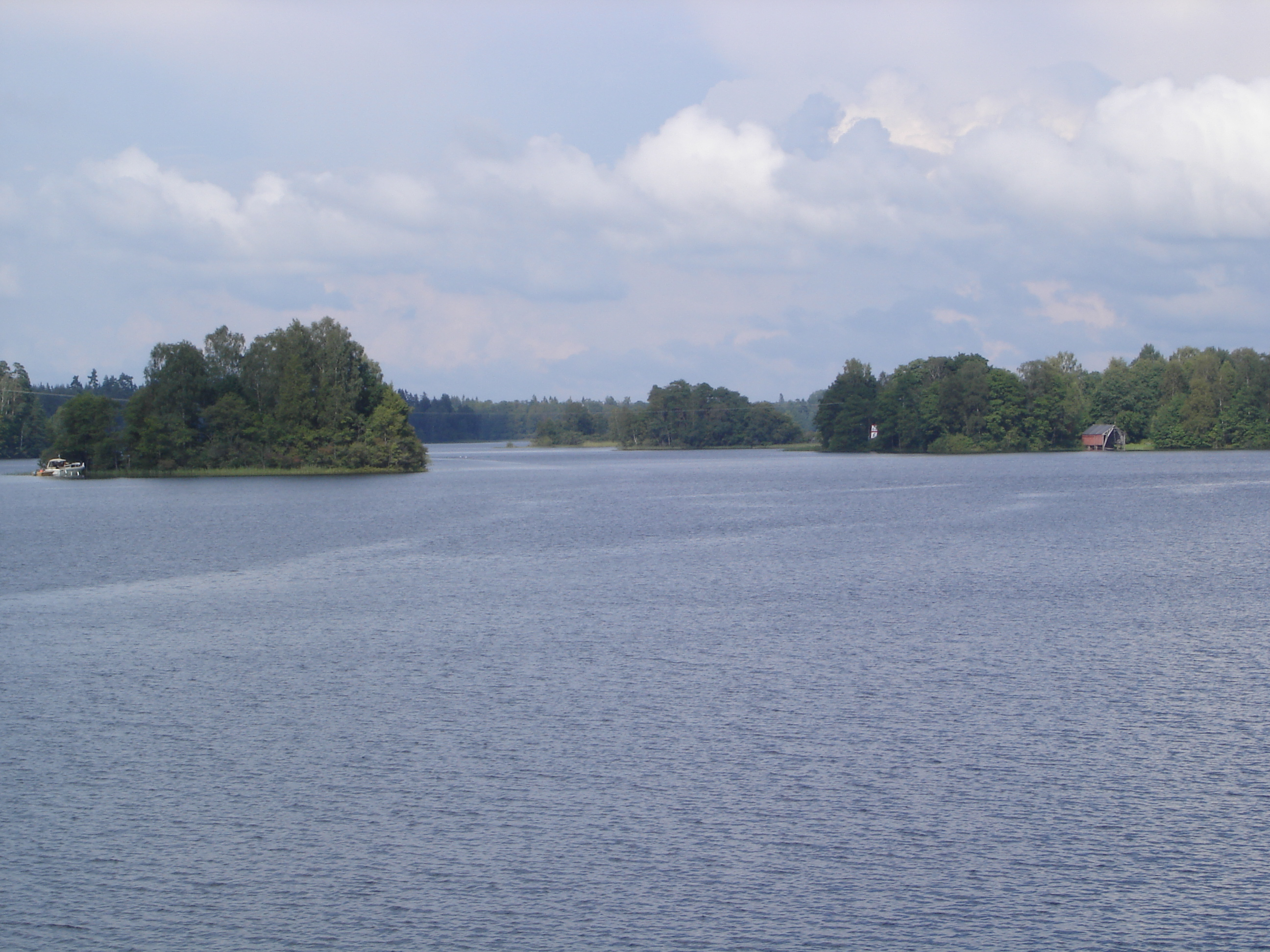

- Location within Sweden
- Location: Småland
- Coordinates: 56°55′N 13°40′E
- Primary outflows: Storån, Bolmen Water Tunnel
- Basin countries: Sweden
- Surface area: 184 km^{2} (71 sq mi)
- Max. depth: 37 m (121 ft)
- Settlements: Bolmsö

Bolmen (Swedish pronunciation: [ˈbɔ̌lmɛn]) is a lake in Småland, Sweden. Covering 184 km^{2}, and with a maximum depth of 37 m, it supplies a considerable part of Skåne with fresh water by means of an 82-km long tunnel, the Bolmen Water Tunnel, built during the 1970s and 80s. Bolmen is situated at the heart of Finnveden, one of the small lands of today's Småland.

It is the second largest lake in Småland, after Vättern. It is the tenth largest lake in Sweden.

It contains 365 islands, of which the largest is Bolmsö, which was historically the meeting-place of the local assembly.

As of 2024, the lake provides drinking water for over a million people in Southern Sweden.
