= List of compositions by Geirr Tveitt =

This is a list of compositions by Geirr Tveitt. Since a sizable corpus of his works are lost, and since there are pieces that have been assigned an Opus number, but without names, pieces will be presented here as that.

== By Opus number ==
Opus	Name	Instruments/voices used	Notes
1	Three sonatas for Solo Violin (lost)	Solo Violin	In and interview for NRK 14 February 1977, Tveitt claims that the first Opus wasn't for piano, but for violin. He mentions that his first Opus was "Two-part Slått for piano". "12 Two-part Inventions for piano" was published and is now known as Op. 1, most likely because it was his first work which was published.
2	12 Two-part Inventions for piano	Piano	First published as Op. 1 on Breitkopf & Härtel in 1930.
3	12 Three-part Inventions for piano (partially lost)	Piano	All movements but the fifth, Alegretto grazioso, are lost.
4	12 Four-part Inventions for piano (partially lost)	Piano	All movements but the third, Presto feroce, are lost.
5	Piano Concerto No. 1 in F major	Piano and orchestra	
6	12 Five-part Inventions for piano (lost)	Piano	
7	14 Etudes (lost)	Piano	
8	Prillar	Orchestra	
9	Fantasy for Cello and Piano (lost)	Cello and Piano	
10	Concert halling in E lydian and F dorian	unknown, possibly Violin	
11?	Piano Concerto No. 2 in E-Flat major "Hommage á Ravel"?(lost)	Piano and orchestra, later version for 2 pianos	
12-53	unknown	unknown	
54	Concerto pour Saxophone et Orchestra (lost)	Saxophone and Orchestra	
55-80	unknown	unknown	
81	Baldurs draumar	Orchestra	
82-90	unknown	unknown	
91	Baldurs draumar (partially lost)	Piano	Arrangement of Op. 81
92-103	unknown	unknown	
104	Dragaredokko (lost?)	Orchestra/piano	
105-107	unknown	unknown	
108	The Ocean	Piano	
109-125	unknown	unknown	
126	Piano Concerto No. 3 "Hommage á Brahms (lost)	Piano and orchestra	Although the work is lost, there is a recording of the piece. Since 2011 there have been plans of reconstructing it.
127-128	unknown	unknown	
129	Piano Sonata No. 29	Piano	
130	Piano Concerto No. 4	Piano and Orchestra	
131	unknown	unknown	
132	Aeolian Harp	Piano	Although a recording of Tveitt himself playing the piece exists, it differs radically from the only known, existent autograph score. It is possible that the recording is based on a later version of this piece which did not survive the fire, since the recording was made a few years after the score was completed. If this is true, then the final version of the piece is lost.
133-149	unknown	unknown	
150	Fifty Folk-Tunes from Hardanger	Piano	
151	A Hundred Folk Tunes from Hardanger; Suite No. 1 (1-15)	Orchestra	Partial arrangements of Op. 150
151	A Hundred Folk Tunes from Hardanger; Suite No. 2 (16-30)	Orchestra	Partial arrangements of Op. 150
151	A Hundred Folk Tunes from Hardanger; Suite No. 3 (31-45) (lost)	Orchestra	Partial arrangements of Op. 150
151	A Hundred Folk Tunes from Hardanger; Suite No. 4 (46-60)	Orchestra	Partial arrangements of Op. 150
151	A Hundred Folk Tunes from Hardanger; Suite No. 5 (61-75)	Orchestra	Partial arrangements of Op. 150
151	A Hundred Folk Tunes from Hardanger; Suite No. 6 (76-100) (lost)	Orchestra	Partial arrangements of Op. 150
152	unknown	unknown	
153	Nótt ok Dagr (Night and Day)	Bariton and piano	
154-155	unknown	unknown	
156	Piano Concerto No. 5	Piano and orchestra	
157-162	unknown	unknown	
163	Concerto No. 1 For Harding Fiddle and Orchestra	Harding Fiddle and Orchestra	
164	Husguden?	unknown	
165	unknown	unknown	
166	7 Sivlesongs	unknown	
167	Kjikarten	unknown	
168-169	unknown	unknown	
170	Concerto for Harp and Orchestra No. 2	Harp and Orchestra	
171-182	unknown	unknown	
183	Symphony No. 1 (Christmas)	Orchestra	
184	The House God	Orchestra	
185-186	unknown	unknown	
187	Nykken	Orchestra	
188-202	unknown	unknown	
203	Sinfonietta di soffiatori	Orchestra	
204	Det gamle kvernhuset	Orchestra	
205-242	unknown	unknown	
243	Songs to Poems by Olav H. Hauge	Voice and Piano	
244-245			
246	Songs to Poems by Aslaug Låstad Lygre	Voice and Piano	
247-248	unknown	unknown	
249	Songs to Poems by Knut Horvei	Voice and Piano	
250	Jeppe	Orchestra and soloists	Opera
251	unknown	unknown	
252	Concerto No. 2 for Harding Fiddle (Three Fjords)	Harding Fiddle and Orchestra	Each movement is based on a fjord in Norway. The Hardangerfjord, Sognefjord and the Nordfjord.
