= Atlakviða =

One of the heroic poems of the Poetic Edda

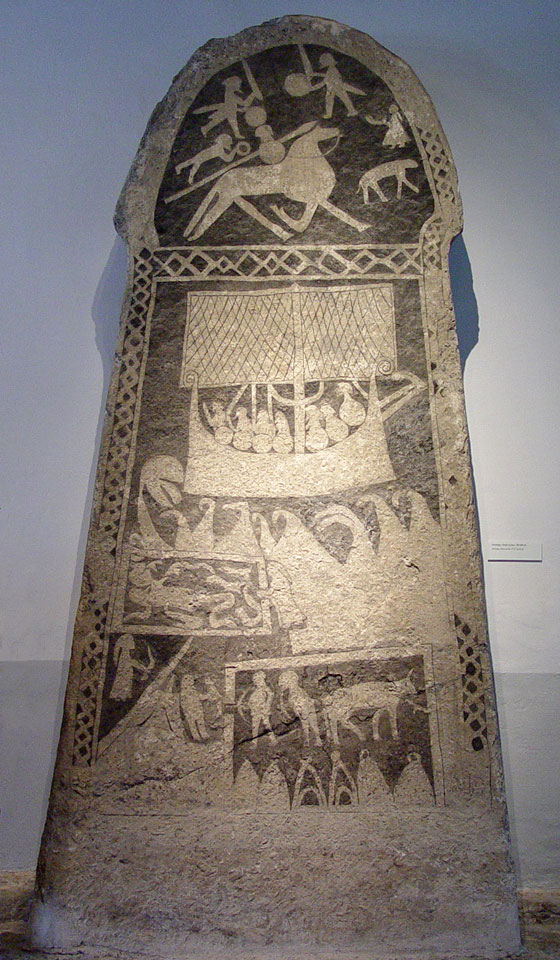
The Hunninge Image Stone on Gotland, Sweden, with imagery that probably refers to Atlakviða, or another story or poem on the same events. On the top of the stone, there is a man carrying a ring, who may be Sigurd or the messenger Knéfrøðr. On the bottom left, the scene depicts a woman watching the snake pit where Gunnar is lying.

Atlakviða (The Lay of Atli) is one of the heroic poems of the Poetic Edda. One of the main characters is Atli who originates from Attila the Hun. It is one of the most archaic Eddic poems, possibly dating to as early as the 9th century. Owing to its stylistic similarity to Hrafnsmál it has been suggested that the poem might have been composed by Þorbjörn Hornklofi. It is preserved in the Codex Regius and the same story is related in the Völsunga saga. In the manuscript the poem is identified as Greenlandic but most scholars believe that this results from a confusion with Atlamál. The metre of the poem alternates irregularly between málaháttr and fornyrðislag. This may be an indication that two or more original poems have been merged or that the short and long lines were not felt as constituting two different metres at the time the poem was composed.

== Historical background ==
Atlakviða's subject relates to the historical interaction between Burgundians and Huns in the 5th century. The poem is the oldest surviving version of the legend about the visit of the Burgundian rulers to Atli's court and the revenge of Guðrún. Ultimately derived from Burgundian heroic legend, the Scandinavian literature about the subject is believed to be based on either Low German models or Gothic poems that reached Scandinavia via the Baltic region.

Scholars date the composition of Atlakviða to around the year 900, which makes it one of the oldest lays of the Poetic Edda. The 13th-century Codex Regius, in which the poem survives, says that it was written in Greenland, but the early composition date makes this implausible, since Greenland was not colonized until around 985. A Norwegian origin is considered likely. Due to stylistic similarities to the skaldic poem Hrafnsmál, the medievalist Felix Genzmer argued that Atlakviða was written by that poem's author Þorbjörn Hornklofi in 872; it may at least have been inspired by Hrafnsmál. The metre in Atlakviða combines málaháttr and fornyrðislag, which together with stylistic variations also has led to suggestions that the poem was written by several authors. In the Scandinavian material, the same story is treated in a different way in the later poem Atlamál and retold in prose in the Völsunga saga.

== Synopsis ==
Atli, king of the Huns, sends a messenger to Gunnarr, king of the Burgundians, and his younger brother Högni. The messenger says that Atli is inviting the brothers to his court and offering them great riches. The brothers are skeptical of the offer since they already have an exceedingly great treasure of gold. Confirming their suspicions is a ring sent by their sister Guðrún, Atli's wife, with a wolf's hair wrapped onto it. Atli obviously plans treachery but Gunnarr still decides to take up the offer, vowing that if he doesn't return no-one will benefit from his riches.

As Gunnarr and Högni arrive at Atli's court they meet Guðrún who tells them that they should not have come. Gunnarr is seized by Atli's men while Högni fights and kills eight men before he is subdued. The Huns ask Gunnarr if he wants to ransom his life by telling them where he has hidden his gold. He tells them that he wants to see Högni's heart. They first cut out the heart of a cowardly man named Hjalli and bring it to Gunnarr but he sees from the cowardly trembling of the heart who its owner was. Then they cut out Högni's heart and he dies laughing. Gunnarr recognizes the heart of his brave brother but tells the Huns that now that he alone knows the location of the gold he can be certain that it will never be disclosed. The Huns then throw him into a snake pit where he dies playing a harp.

Guðrún prepares a banquet for Atli and his court. When the feast is well underway she tells Atli that he is actually eating the flesh of their two sons. Guðrún later kills the unattentive Atli in his bed, sets loose the hounds and awakens the housecarls she has bribed. Guðrún throws a burning twig into the hall and eventually Atli's entire estate is set ablaze. All the people in the hall, Atli's temple, the "dwelling of the Buthlungs" as well as shield-maidens are consumed by the fire.

== Themes and interpretations ==
Gunnarr is shown to be heroic in his moment of defeat and the poet explicitly praises both his and Högni's choices of action. The acceptance of Atli's invitation in spite of clear danger can be understood as necessary in order to not be labeled a coward. The German studies scholar Carola L. Gottzmann interprets the visit as a reaction to Atli's offer of gifts, which implies a demand of submission to the Hunnic king. The poet praises how Gunnarr ensures that his gold never will be found, which may be seen as contrary to the ethics of the Germanic lord-retainer system, where societal bonds were created through the generous distribution of wealth. The poem's description of gold as a "discord-metal of men" (Old Norse: rógmálmi scatna) does however align with the Icelandic Rune Poem's opening line, "wealth is kinsmen's discord" (Old Norse: fé er frænda róg).

Guðrún is relentless in her need to avenge her brothers. Although the poem expresses horror when it portrays the consequences of her actions—filicide, unsuspecting cannibalism and the deaths of kings—there is no direct condemnation of her behaviour. Unlike in Guðrúnarhvöt, where Guðrún is angry at the Norns for making her kill her sons, Atlakviða only suggests sorrow once, in strophe 37, before strophe 38 says that she "never wept". She kills Atli when he is in a defenseless state and unlike in Atlamál, he is not portrayed as a tyrannical husband. The final strophe (43) does stress that her actions led to the deaths of three kings. According to the medievalist Ursula Dronke, this might have been a later addition, but the strophe that precedes it also focuses on the deaths her actions caused. The heroic ethic of vengeance that overtakes Guðrún makes her monstrous, giving her an inhuman self-control which the poem's author appears to find both horrific and admirable.
