= Op. 129 =

In music, Op. 129 stands for Opus number 129. Compositions that are assigned this number include:

- Beethoven – Rage Over a Lost Penny
- Schumann – Cello Concerto
- Shostakovich – Violin Concerto No. 2
- Tveitt – Piano Sonata No. 29
