= Op. 151 =

In music, Op. 151 stands for Opus number 151. Compositions that are assigned this number include:

- Diabelli – Sonatinas
- Ries – Piano Concerto No. 8
- Tveitt – A Hundred Hardanger Tunes
