= Baldrs draumar =

Eddic poem

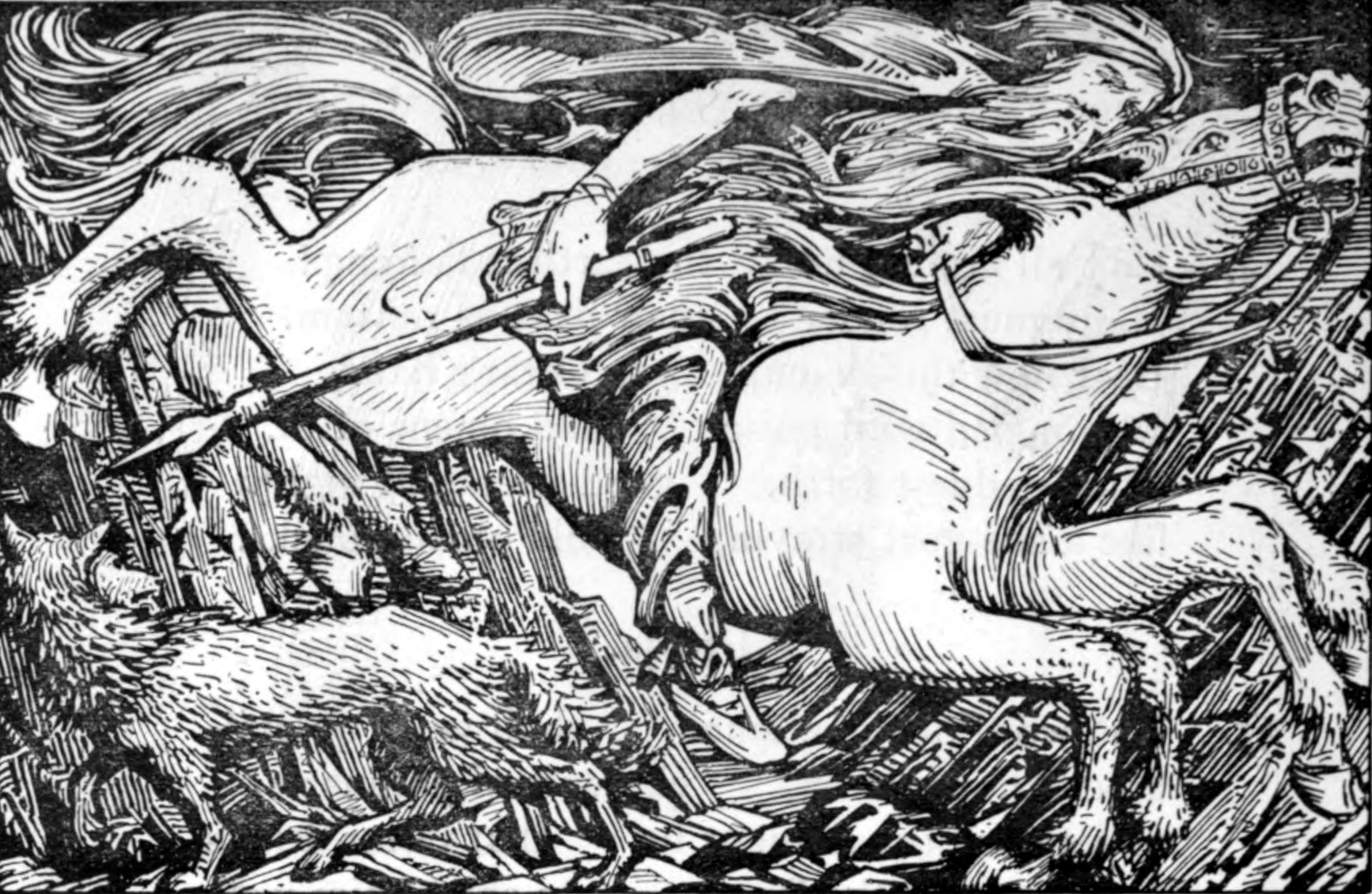
"Odin rides to Hel" (1908) by W. G. Collingwood

Baldrs draumar (Old Norse: 'Baldr's dreams') or Vegtamskviða is an Eddic poem which appears in the manuscript AM 748 I 4to. It describes the myth of Baldr's death consistently with Gylfaginning. Bellows suggest that the poem was composed in the mid 10th century as well as the possibility that the author also composed Völuspá or at least drew from it, pointing at the similarity of stanza 11 in Baldrs draumar and stanzas 32-33 in Völuspá. Additionally, the 14th stanza of Þrymskviða is almost identical to Baldrs draumar's 1st stanza. Only in the last sentence do the two diverge from one another. Guðni argued that Þrymskviða was the younger poem of the two and it had received the stanza from Baldrs draumar.

== Synopsis and text ==
Baldr has been having nightmares. Odin rides to Hel to investigate. He finds the grave of a völva and resurrects her. Their conversation follows, where the völva tells Odin about Baldr's fate. In the end Odin asks her a question which reveals his identity and the völva tells him to ride home.

== Form and date ==
The poem is one of the shortest Eddic poems, consisting of 14 fornyrðislag stanzas. Some late paper manuscripts contain about five more stanzas, those are thought to be of young origin. Sophus Bugge believed them to have been composed by the author of Forspjallsljóð, which is thought to have been written in the 17th century. Bellows, on the other hand, suggests the poem is much older but could not date it earlier than the tenth century.

== Influence ==
The confrontation between The Wanderer (Wotan) and Erda in Act 3, Scene 1 of Richard Wagner's opera Siegfried is based upon Baldrs draumar.

The poem inspired a ballet, Baldurs draumar (Baldur's Dreams), by the Norwegian composer Geirr Tveitt, first staged in 1938.
