= Þorbjǫrn hornklofi =

9th-century Norwegian skald

Þórbjǫrn hornklofi
- Occupation: Skald
- Writing career
- Language: Old Norse
- Years active: 9th century
- Period: Viking Age
- Notable works: Hrafnsmál, Glymdrápa
- Literary movement: Skaldic poetry

Þórbjǫrn hornklofi (Modern Norwegian: Torbjørn Hornklove; note that hornklofi is a nickname, not a surname) was a 9th-century Norwegian skald and one of the court poets of King Harald Fairhair. His poetry has sometimes been regarded as a contemporary source of information regarding King Harald, although it is only preserved embedded within 13th and 14th century king's sagas.

The two skaldic poems by him which are preserved, both only in excerpts, are Hrafnsmál and Glymdrápa. The first poem, which utilizes verse form málaháttr, describes life at Harald's court, mentions that he took a Danish wife, and that he won a victory at the Battle of Hafrsfjord. The second is the earliest preserved drápa in regular dróttkvætt, and relates a series of battles Harald won during the consolidation of his rule of Norway.

== Translations ==
- Kershaw, Nora (1922) Anglo-Saxon and Norse Poems. The University Press
- The Lay of Harold in Hollander, Lee Milton (1936) Old Norse Poems: The Most Important Nonskaldic Verse Not Included in the Poetic Edda
- R. D. Fulk 2012, ‘(Biography of) Þorbjǫrn hornklofi’ in Diana Whaley (ed.), Poetry from the Kings’ Sagas 1: From Mythical Times to c. 1035. Skaldic Poetry of the Scandinavian Middle Ages 1. Turnhout: Brepols, p. 73.
