= Torgeir Kinne Solsvik =

Norwegian pianist (born 1979)

- Born: 15 October 1979 (age 46); Hordaland, Norway
- Genre: Classical
- Occupation: Pianist
- Website: www.kinnepiano.no

Torgeir Kinne Solsvik (born 15 October 1979) is a Norwegian pianist. He is listed among local artists in the magazine Harding PULS.

== Discography ==
Published	Record company	Contents
1998		Works by Bedřich Smetana, Ludwig van Beethoven, Sergej Prokofjev and Robert Schumann.
2001	Vest-Norsk Plateselskap	50 Folketunes from Hardanger by Geirr Tveitt and «Slåtter» by Edvard Grieg.
2007	Kinne Piano	In 2005 Solsvik recorded Ballade by Edvard Grieg, Papillons by Schumann and Bilder fra en utstilling by Mussorgsky.
2010	Kinne Piano	Geirr Tveitt Piano Works and Songs together with baritone Ørjan Hartveit.
2012	Kinne Piano	Haugtussa and Holberg-suiten by Edvard Grieg together with soprano Ranveig Helen Leagreid.
2012	Kinne Piano	Schumann/Grieg: Dichterliebe and some melodies from Grieg songs together with John Kristian Karlsen.
2012	Kinne Piano	Piano by Torgeir Kinne Solsvik
2012	Kinne Piano	18 songs by Sergej Rakhmaninov and Lyrics of Pushkin by Boris Tsjaikovskij with soprano Olga Sosnovskaya.
2014	Kinne Piano	Piano sonatas by Ludwig van Beethoven
2015	Kinne Piano	Femti Folkatonar frao Hardanger, op.150 (re-master)
