= Hrafnsmál =

9th century skaldic poem

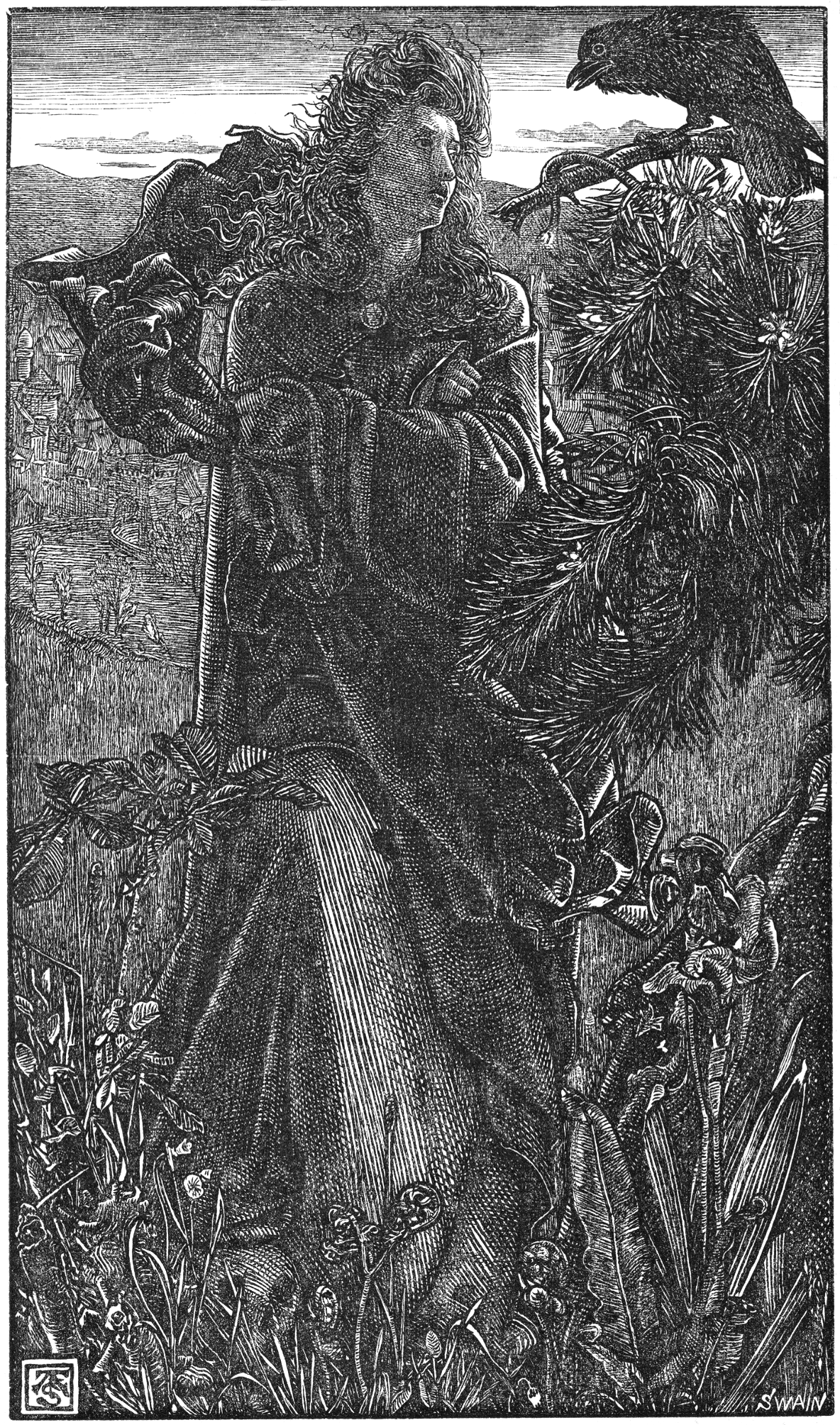
A valkyrie speaks with a raven in a wood-engraving by Joseph Swain after Frederick Sandys, 1862

Hrafnsmál (Old Norse: [ˈhrɑvnsˌmɑːl]; "raven song") is a fragmentary skaldic poem generally accepted as being written by the 9th-century Norwegian skald Þorbjörn Hornklofi. Hrafnsmál largely consists of a conversation between an unnamed valkyrie and a raven; the two discuss the life and martial deeds of Harald Fairhair. Due to this, the poem is sometimes referred to as Haraldskvæði [ˈhɑrɑldsˌkwɛːðe]. The meter of the poem is dominantly Málaháttr, while smaller portions are in Ljóðaháttr and Fornyrðislag. Through dating of the parts as well as the meter is consistent, they may be separate compositions but scholarly consensus is indecisive. The poem is usually described as a praise poem, but bears more resemblance in style to the Eddic poems. In style, it so much resembles Atlakviða (one of the oldest Eddic poems) that it has been suggested they were both composed by Hornklofi. Stanzas from the poem were reworked into a song by Einar Selvik for the game Assassin's Creed Valhalla.

== Editions and translations ==
- Borrow, George (Trans.) (1862). Once A Week: An Illustrated Miscellany of Literature, Art, Science &Popular Information. Vol. VII. June to December, 1862. London: Bradbury & Evans, 11, Bouverie Street. Entitled Harald Harfagr. Features an illustration by Anthony Frederick Augustus Sandys.
- Kershaw, Nora (1922). Anglo-Saxon and Norse Poems. Cambridge at the University Press.
- Hollander, Lee Milton (1980). Old Norse Poems: The Most Important Nonskaldic Verse Not Included in the Poetic Edda. Forgotten Books. ISBN 1-60506-715-6
- Fulk, R. D. (2012). "Þorbjǫrn hornklofi, Haraldskvæði (Hrafnsmál)". In Whaley, Diana (ed.). Poetry from the Kings’ Sagas 1: From Mythical Times to c. 1035. Skaldic Poetry of the Scandinavian Middle Ages 1. Turnhout: Brepols. p. 91. ISBN 978-2-503-51896-1.

== See also ==
- Huginn and Muninn, the ravens of the god Odin
- Valravn, a supernatural "raven of the slain" appearing in 19th century Danish folk songs
