= Piano Sonata No. 29 =

Piano Sonata No. 29 may refer to:

- Piano Sonata No. 29 (Beethoven), known as the "Hammerklavier"
- Piano Sonata No. 29 (Tveitt)
