= Kostbera =

Mythological Norse woman

Kostbera is the wife of the mythical Norse hero Hogni. She appears exclusively in Atlamál and the Völsunga saga, and is believed to be an invention of the poem's author. Kostbera and Hogni are presented in contrast to two other married couples in the poem: Glaumvor and Gunnar, and Gudrun and Vingi. With Hogni, she is a parent to four sons: Solar, Snævar, Hniflung and Gjuki. Gjuki is only mentioned in Drap Niflunga.
