= Sagnakvæði =

Genre of traditional Icelandic poems

Sagnakvæði (literally "narrative poems"), also known as Eddic fairy-tales, are anonymous, traditional Icelandic poems composed in the fornyrðislag metre. The subject matter of sagnakvæði derives from, or is otherwise similar to, medieval romances and fairy-tales.

Written down from oral tradition by antiquarians in the seventeenth and eighteenth centuries, they are generally thought to have originated in the Middle Ages as a direct continuation of the classical Eddaic poems which were recorded in the Middle Ages themselves. The poems are often beautiful and emotive, with some similarities in style to the Icelandic rhymed epics known as rímur.

== Sources ==
The first known collector of Eddic fairy-tales (amongst other literature) is Gissur Sveinsson (1604–83). Another important collector was Árni Magnússon (1663–1730). Though the collectors were male, it seems that their informants were largely women, suggesting that sagnakvæði were, at least at the time when they were collected, largely women's literature. This correlates with their tendency to focus on female characters.

== List of sagnakvæði ==
This list and summaries are based on the survey by Haukur Þorgeirsson:

- Bryngerðarljóð. The poem tells of a love affair which is opposed by the woman's parents.
- Gullkársljóð. Æsa, a princess, is successfully wooed by an elf called Gúllkár, later fleeing the parental home to join him in Álfheimar.
- Hyndluljóð hin nýju. The protagonist of Hyndluljóð is a princess, Signý Logadóttir. Her wicked stepmother turns her into a female dog (Icelandic hyndla), but Signý manages to turn her stepmother into a cat in revenge. Signý takes to herding the cattle of some peasants. However, a prince sees her during a brief spell in human form, falls in love with her, and their marriage breaks her curse.
- Kringilnefjukvæði. A poor man, who has lost his wife, has a daughter, Gullinhöfða. A mysterious troll-woman, Kringilnefja, marries the man, teaches Gullinhöfða needlework, and enables her to marry a prince. Kringilnefja turns out to be Gullinhöfða’s aunt under a curse.
- Kötludraumur. A woman, Katla, dreams that an elf has sex with her. She and her husband raise the resulting child.
- Snjáskvæði. The hero is a princess of the elves. A curse is placed on her, making her seem to be a human king.
- Vambarljóð. The widowed King Hringr marries a witch called Yrsa. Yrsa turns Hringr's daughter Signý into a stomach. Signý rolls off to the land of King Ásmundr, where she finds work herding goats. She angers Ásmundr, who strikes her but gets stuck to her. Signý says that she will let Ásmundr go if her marries her. With great reluctance, Ásmundr agrees, and on going to bed with Ásmundr Signý is freed from her curse.
- Þóruljóð. A giant or otherwise tall woman visits a farm at Yuletide and leaves a gift. According to Haukur Þorgeirsson, "from the point of view of metrics and historical linguistics, Þóruljóð is the most archaic of the Eddic fairy-tales. It is possible that it is genuinely older than the others but another possibility is that it is merely better preserved."
