= Atlamál =

One of the heroic poems of the Poetic Edda

The bottom of page 43 verso of the Codex Regius contains stanzas 96 and 97 of Atlamál.

Atlamál in grǿnlenzku ('The Greenlandic Lay of Atli') is one of the heroic poems of the Poetic Edda. It relates the same basic story as Atlakviða at greater length and in a different style. The poem is believed to have been composed in Greenland, most likely in the 12th century. It has 103 stanzas and is the only Eddic poem written entirely in the metre málaháttr.

== Plot summary ==
Plotting to kill his brothers-in-law, Atli dispatches messengers to Gunnarr and Högni, the sons of Gjúki, with an invitation to his hall. Guðrún daughter of Gjúki, Atli's wife, learns about the plot and sends a runic message to her brothers but the runes are corrupted by one of the messengers, Vingi. Nevertheless, Kostbera, Högni's wife, discerns from the runes that something is wrong and warns Högni. Högni dismisses her fears but she persists and describes dreadful dreams she has had, interpreting them as warnings. Högni remains unmoved and explains the dreams away. Glaumvör, Gunnarr's wife, has also had bad dreams which she describes to her husband, who also attempts to explain them away. Eventually Gunnarr admits that their lives may be short but tells Glaumvör that he cannot evade his doom. The brothers set out to Atli with only three companions. The women follow the brothers to a fjord where their ways must part. Glaumvör reminds Vingi of the sanctity due to a guest and he swears that there is no deception. Kostbera and Högni say farewell to each other and the men row away.

As the brothers and their companions arrive at Atli's door, Vingi admits to his treachery and is promptly slain. Atli then attacks the five guests with a force of 30. The battle rages for hours and Guðrún joins it on the side of her brothers, throwing away her jewelry. Finally the children of Gjúki are overpowered, having slain 18 of Atli's warriors. Atli trades accusations with his wife and orders the execution of Gunnarr and Högni. Following a comical episode with Hjalli, Atli's cook, Atli has the brothers executed. Högni dies laughing while Gunnarr dies playing a harp with his toes.

Atli discusses matters with Guðrún. She tells him that things will go badly for him unless he kills her too. He tries to console her by promising precious gifts and she pretends to relent, asking Atli for a great ale-feast to commemorate her brothers. Guðrún then kills their two sons and has the unsuspecting Atli use their heads as drinking vessels and eat their roasted hearts. Later Guðrún kills Atli with the aid of Hniflungr, son of Högni. The final part of the poem consists of exchanges between Guðrún and Atli. Guðrún recalls her glorious past when she went harrying with Sigurðr and her brothers. Atli recalls his marriage proposal to Guðrún and how she was never content in their marriage, despite all their riches. In the end he asks Guðrún to give him an honorable burial and she agrees. She then attempts suicide and fails. The poem ends on a note that any man who begets such offspring as Gjúki's is fortunate.

== Date and provenance ==
Both Atlamál and Atlakviða are referred to as Greenlandic poems in the Codex Regius. Most scholars believe Atlakviða to be older than the Norse colony in Greenland and reject a Greenlandic origin for that poem. Atlamál, on the other hand, is believed to be of an age consistent with composition in Greenland. Moreover, some aspects of the poem itself are suggestive of Greenland. In particular one of Kostbera's ominous dreams has a realistic description of a polar bear. The grim tone of the poem is also consistent with what is known of the Greenland settlement. The relatively mean conditions of the chieftains in the poem—the Niflungar, for example, have only 10 retainers—have also been taken as strengthening the case for an origin in Greenlandic culture.

== See also ==
- Greenlandic Norse
