= Sigtuna box =

11th century copper box from Sweden

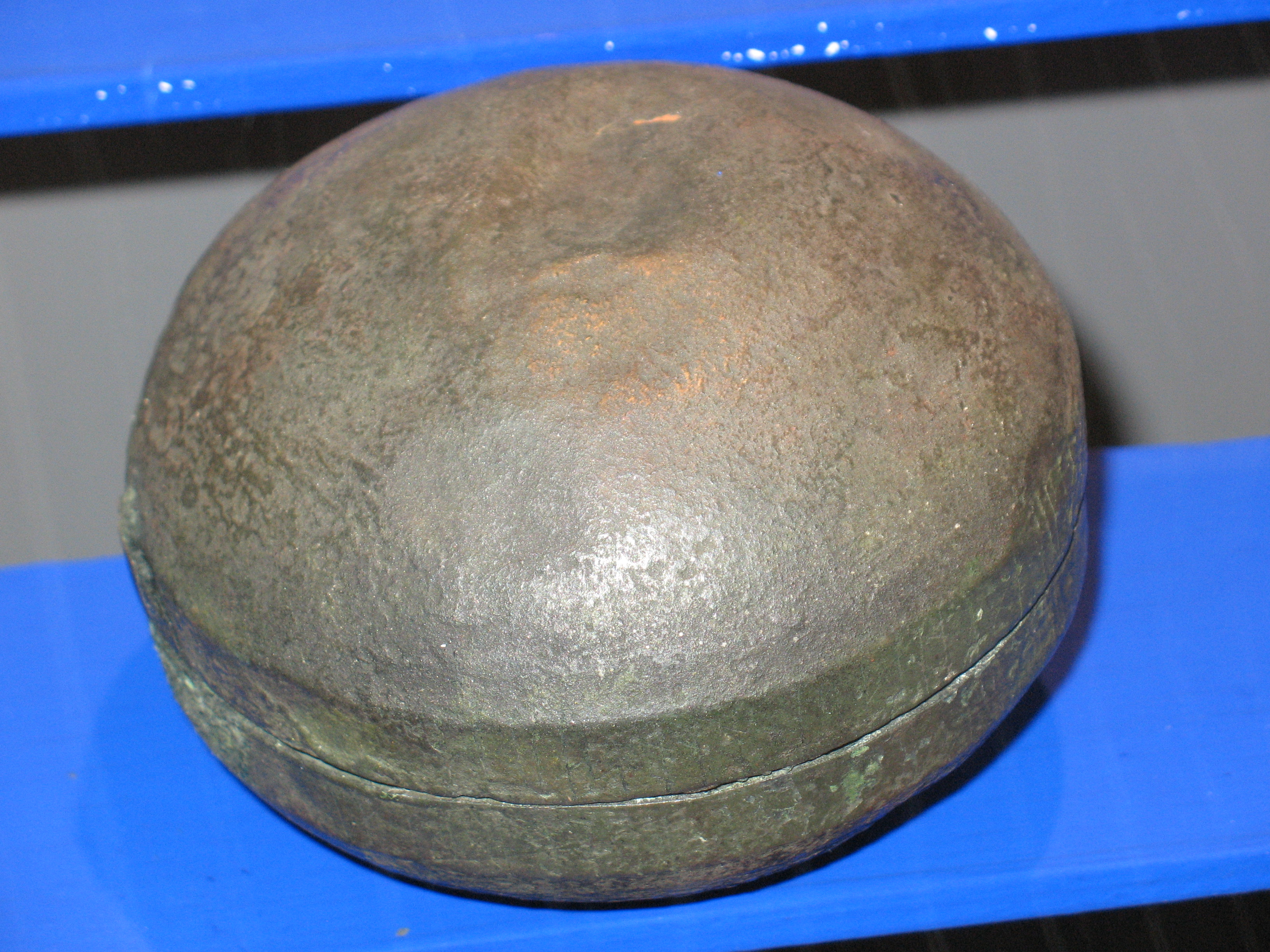
The Sigtuna box.

The Sigtuna box is a copper box from Sigtuna, Sweden, which was engraved with a runic inscription in the early 11th century. The box not only tells of trading across the Baltic Sea, it is also engraved with an Old Norse poem in dróttkvætt, the lordly meter which was used when skalds praised lords and kings. The poem talks of thieves being devoured by ravens.

== Discovery ==
The box was discovered in August 1911, when an upholsterer was digging at the bank of lake Mälaren. The finder reported it to have been filled with a heavy substance like coarse wet coffee-grounds, and which was probably made up of small pieces of metal. The substance was kept inside a cloth which quickly disintegrated as soon as he touched it. The content, which weighed about 2 kg (4.4 lb), was unfortunately thrown away, but the box was sent to the Swedish Museum of National Antiquities where the runic inscription was discovered.

== Description and use ==
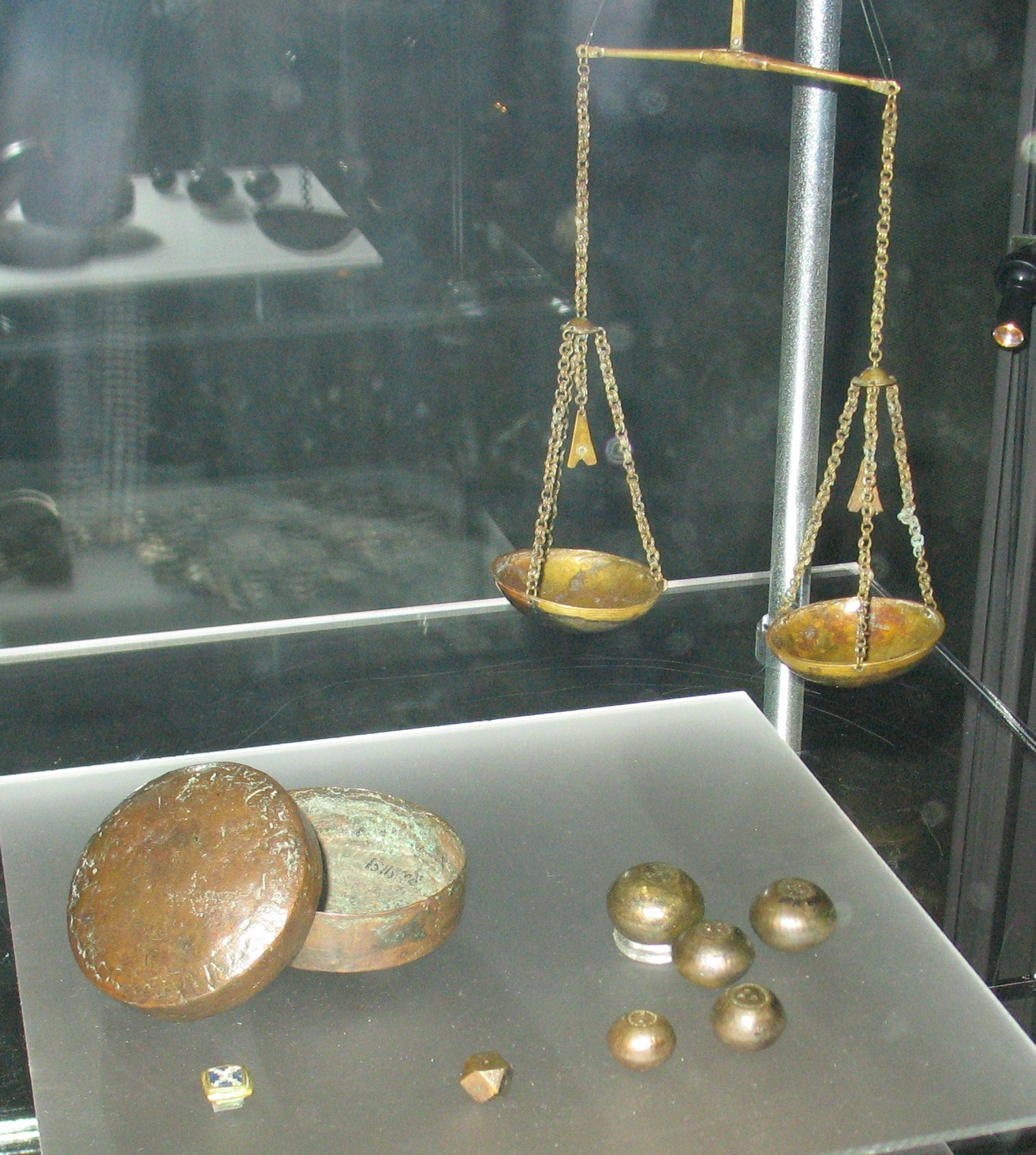
A box of the same kind with a Norse merchant's tools, at the Swedish Museum of National Antiquities.

The box measures 10 cm (3.9 in) across on the outside and the space inside measures 9.6 cm (3.8 in) to 9.8 cm (3.9 in). The thickness of the metal is on average 2 mm (0.079 in). From top to bottom, it measures 7.8 cm (3.1 in).

The box was used by a merchant to keep a small pair of scales for weighing silver and gold. More than 100 similar scales have been found in Birka, Sigtuna's predecessor as emporia, and they were a merchant's insignia, and his most important equipment.

== Inscription ==
Latin transliteration and transcription:

tiarfr × fik af × simskum × moni × skalaʀ × þis[aʀ] i ...(o)t(i) × in uirmuntr × f(a)þi × runor × þisar
Diarfʀ {} fækk af {} semskum {} manni {} skalaʀ {} þessaʀ i(?) ...[l]andi. {} En Værmundr {} faði {} runaʀ {} þessaʀ.
"Diarfr got from a man from Samland / Semgallen these scales in(?) ...-land. And Vermundr coloured these runes."

fuhl × ualua × slait × (f)aluon × fon kauk × o nos au-a
Fugl {} vælva {} slæit {} falvan: {} fann gauk {} a nas au[k]a.
"The bird tore apart the pale thief: (One) found (ie observed) the increase (ie from eating) in the corpse-cuckoo (raven)."

=== Prose part (A) ===
The first part of the inscription contains the merchant's name Diarfr and informs of how he acquired the box and its contents, but it does not give any precise information on from where he got his scales. The adjective semskR is ambiguous and the phrase af semskum manni can both mean that the man came from Sambia and from Zemgale.

=== Poetry part (B) ===
Drawing of the box. Note that the runes in the drawing are not entirely accurate.

The second part of the inscription contains a couplet in the skaldic metre known as dróttkvætt. Here follows Jansson's transcription and translation (1987):

Fugl velva slæit falvan,
fann'k gauk a nas auka.
"The bird tore the pale thief
I saw how the corpse-cuckoo swelled."

The word velva is in the accusative case and it is probably the same word as the Gothic wilwa ("robber"). Nas gaukR is a kenning for raven which literally means "corpse's cuckoo," and a comparable expression known from Old Icelandic poems is hræva gaukr ("carrion's cuckoo"). The idea that a dead thief should be food for ravens is also in agreement with poetic imagery from the Göksholm runestone and the Rök runestone where ravens and wolves feast on the slain. (For the symbolism of the raven in Viking culture, see the Raven banner.)
