= Fyrby Runestone =

Viking Age runestone in Södermanland, Sweden

Coordinates: 58.9533°N 16.6689°E

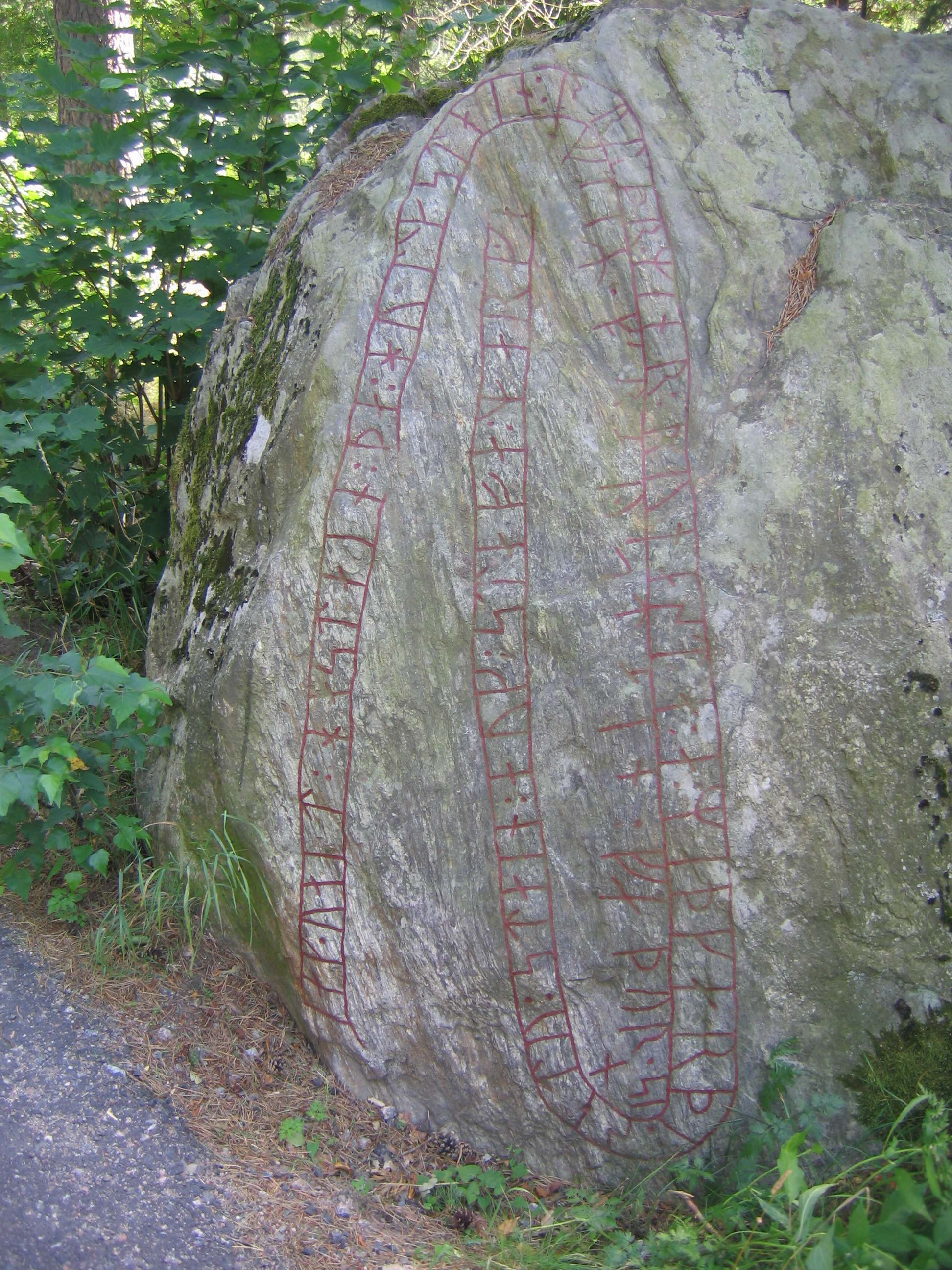
The Fyrby Runestone from Södermanland, Sweden.

The Fyrby Runestone, which is designated as Sö 56 in the Rundata catalog, is a Viking Age memorial runestone located in Fyrby, which is about 15 kilometers south of Flen, Södermanland County, Sweden, and in the historic province of Södermanland.

== Description ==
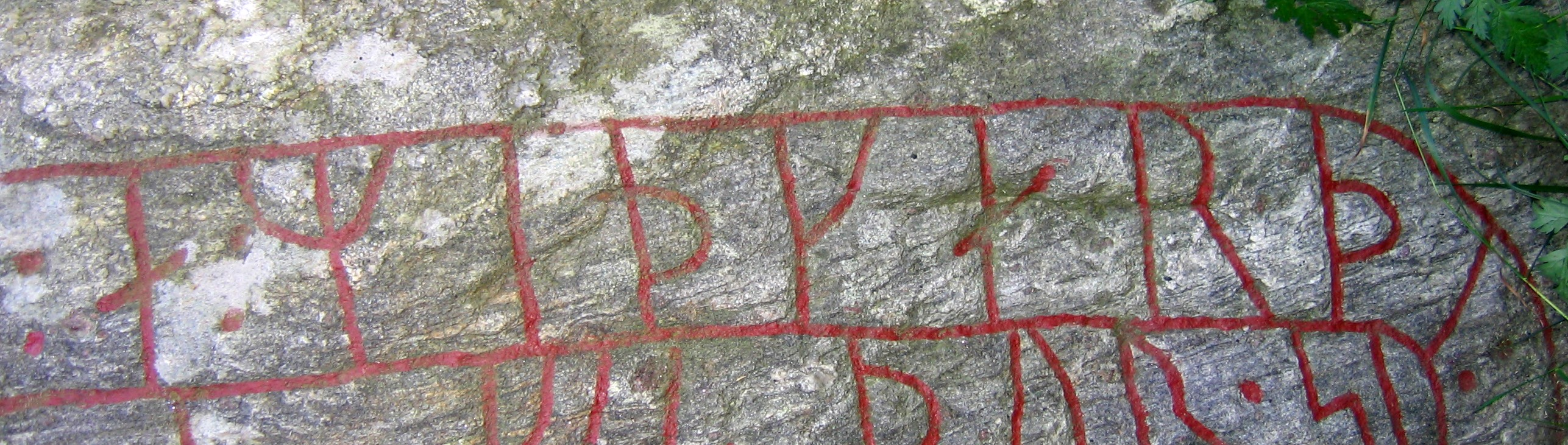
Detail showing the runes: ᛅ ᛬ ᛘᛁᚦᚴᛅᚱᚦᛁ a : miþkarþi á {} Miðgarði "in Middle Earth"

The runic inscription on the Fyrby Runestone consists of runic text within a band that curves along the face of the north side of a granite boulder that is two meters in height. The runic inscription is classified as being carved in runestone style RAK. RAK is the classification for the oldest style where the ends of the runic bands are straight and there are no animal designs. The inscription is considered somewhat enigmatic due to its use of the pronoun "I" at the beginning of the runic text, which might even refer to the stone itself speaking to the reader. This runestone is notable for its reference to Midgard ("Middle Earth"), which was one of the nine worlds of Norse cosmology and the home of humans. The period that Anne-Sofie Gräslund proposed for the RAK style was 990-1010 AD.

The runic text indicates that the inscription is a memorial to a father from his two sons which also boasts of the skills of the sons in rune-making, claiming that the brothers were the most skilled in runes in Miðgarði or "Middle Earth". One personal name in the inscription contains the name of the Norse pagan god Freyr as a theophoric name element. The father's name, Freysteinn, means "Freyr's Stone." In addition, the Hár or "High" in the name Hásteinn, which means "High Stone", may refer to the byname Hár of the god Odin. The names in the Fyrby Runestone inscription also reflect a common practice of that time in Scandinavia of repeating an element in a parent's name in the names of the children. Here the steinn from the father's name, Freystein, is repeated in the names of the two sons, Hásteinn and Holmsteinn, to show the family relationship. The statement that the sons placed stafa marga or "many staffs" in memory of their father may refer to the staves of the runes in the text. Two other inscriptions, DR 40 in Randbøl and Sm 16 in Nöbbele, make explicit use of the word "staff" to refer to runes. Other inscriptions which use the word in reference to the raising of a staff as a monument include Sö 196 in Kolsundet, Vs 1 in Stora Ryttern, U 226 in Bällsta, the now-lost U 332 in Vreta, and the now-lost U 849 in Balingsta.

== Inscription ==
Old East Norse reading
A reading of the Fyrby runestone's text in Old East Norse.

The first line is the runes, the second a transliteration of the runes into Latin characters. Next are two transcriptions: the first in Old West Norse, the second in Old East Norse.

ᛁᛅᚴ ᛫ ᚢᛅᛁᛏ ᛬ ᚼᛅᛋᛏᛅᛁᚾ ᛬ ᚦᛅ ᛬ ᚼᚢᛚᛘᛋᛏᛅᛁᚾ ᛬ ᛒᚱᚤᚦᚱ ᛫ ᛘᛂᚾᚱ ᛬ ᚱᚤᚾᛅᛋᛏᛅ ᛬ ᛅ ᛬ ᛘᛁᚦᚴᛅᚱᚦᛁ ᛬ ᛋᛂᛏᚢ ᛬ ᛋᛏᛅᛁᚾ ᛬ ᛅᚢᚴ ᛬ ᛋᛏᛅᚠᛅ ᛬ ᛘᛅᚱᚵᛅ ¶ ᛂᚠᛐᛁᛦ ᛫ ᚠᚱᛅᚤᛋᛏᛅᛁᚾ ᛬ ᚠᛅᚦᚢᚱ ᛫ ᛋᛁᚾ
iak · uait : hastain : þa : hulmstain : bryþr · menr : rynasta : a : miþkarþi : setu : stain : auk : stafa : marga {} eftiʀ · fraystain · faþur · sin
Ek {} veit {} Hástein {} þá {} Holmstein {} brœðr {} menn {} rýnasta {} á {} Miðgarði, {} settu {} stein {} ok {} stafa {} marga {} eptir {} Freystein, {} fǫður {} sinn.
Iak {} væit {} Hastæin {} þa {} Holmstæin {} brøðr {} mænnr {} rynasta {} a {} Miðgarði, {} sattu {} stæin {} ok {} stafa {} marga {} æftiʀ {} Frøystæin, {} faður {} sinn.
I know Hásteinn and Holmsteinn, the most rune-skilled brothers in Middle Earth, placed many a stone and staff in memory of Freysteinn, their father.

== Alliterative verse ==
It has been noted that the inscription on the Fyrby Runestone can be read as an alliterative verse, specifically in fornyrðislag metre:

Iak væit Hāstæin
þā Holmstæin brø̄ðr
mænnr rȳnasta
ā Miðgarði,
sattu stæin
ok stafa marga
æftiʀ Frøystæin,
faður sinn.

I know the brothers, Hásteinn
and Holmsteinn,
the most rune-skilled men
in Middle Earth,
placed the stone
and many rune-staves
in memory of Freysteinn
their father

== See also ==
- Middle-earth
