= Karl Schmoll von Eisenwerth =

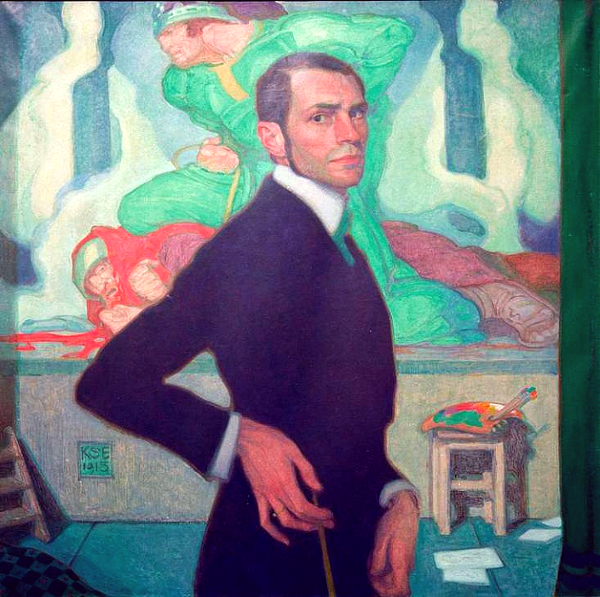
Self-portrait in Front of the Nibelungen Cycle (1915)

Karl Schmoll von Eisenwerth (18 May 1879, Vienna – 7 July 1948, Gut Osternberg, near Braunau am Inn) was an Austrian-born German painter, graphic artist, and glass designer in the Art Nouveau style.

== Biography ==
He was the second of four sons born to Anton Adolph Schmoll, a civil engineer, originally from Sankt Wendel. His mother, Josephine née Uhl, was a native of Vienna. He lived there until he was ten, then in Sankt Wendel for six years, then in Darmstadt. It was there that he first encountered Art Nouveau. From 1899 to 1901, he studied with Paul Hoecker and Ludwig von Herterich at the Academy of Fine Arts, Munich. After completing his studies there, he painted in Burghausen, near the Chiemsee, and at the Dachau Artists' Colony. He also took a study trip to Italy.

In 1906, he taught printmaking and drawing at a progressive private art school, operated by Hermann Obrist and Wilhelm von Debschitz. The following year, he was appointed Professor of ornamental and decorative design at the Stuttgart Institute of Technology. During his time there, he created a cycle of six paintings on the Nibelungenlied, in Worms (lost during World War II), and a large mural depicting a scene from the Odyssey, at the University Library of Tübingen. He served as Rector from 1927 to 1929.

In keeping with family tradition, he became a landowner in 1924, with property in Gut Osternberg. Despite his use of "von", his family had never received an official letter of nobility, and were more properly referred to as "genannt". He had not been given legal permission to use "von" until 1910, when it was granted by the Württemberg Justice Ministry.

His correspondence with the industrialist, Ludwig von Heyl, makes it clear that he was no friend of National Socialism. As the years progressed, his attitude toward the Nazi régime became more resistant, and he grew increasingly isolated, although he retained his professorship. He was not an admirer of contemporary art movements, but was very disturbed by the Degenerate Art exhibition of 1937. His last known work, in 1942, involved decorative paintings for the Officers' Home in Stuttgart. A newspaper article on the occasion of his sixty-fifth birthday in 1944 states that "the Reich Minister Dr. Goebbels telegraphed congratulations". After the war, he retired to his property in Gut Osternberg, and died there in 1948. He never married, and had no children.

== Selected paintings ==
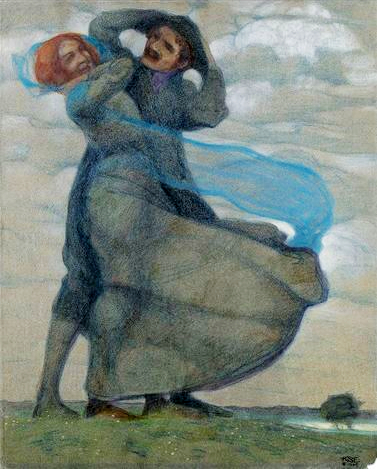
In the Wind

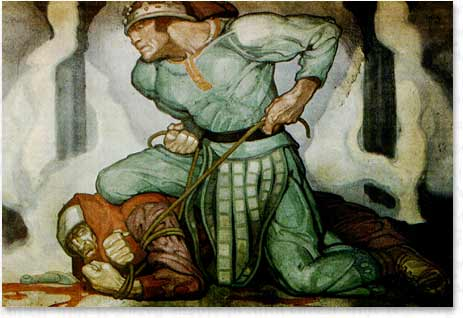
Dietrich von Bern Ties Up Hagen

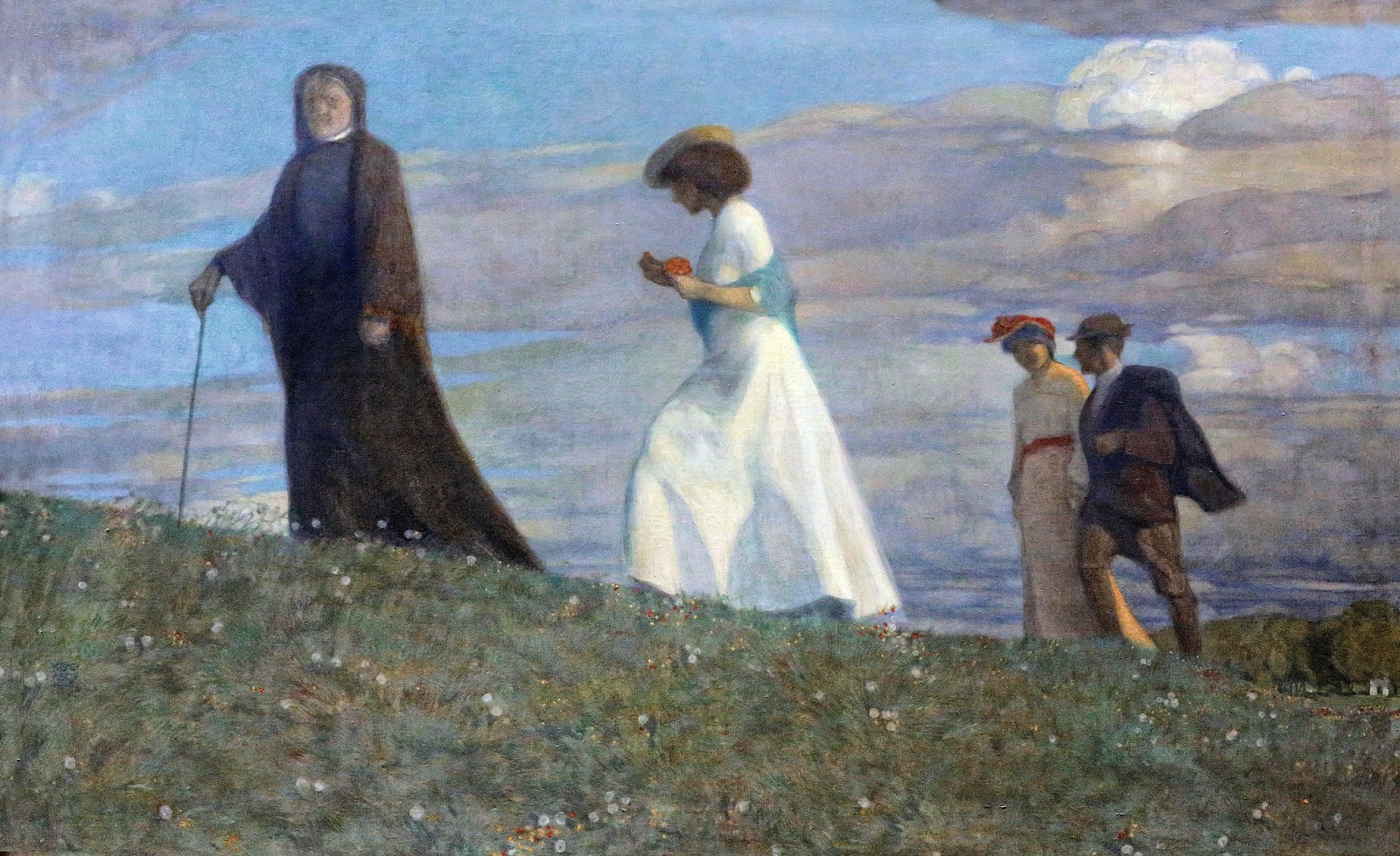
The Promenade

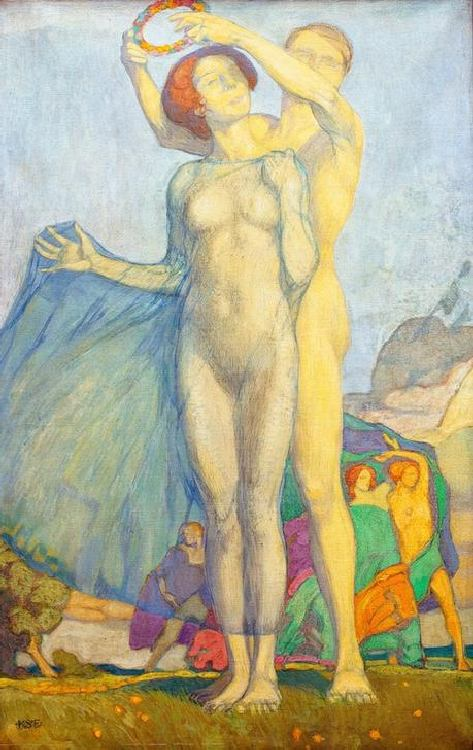
Round Dance
