= Hárbarðsljóð =

Icelandic poem, part of the Poetic Edda

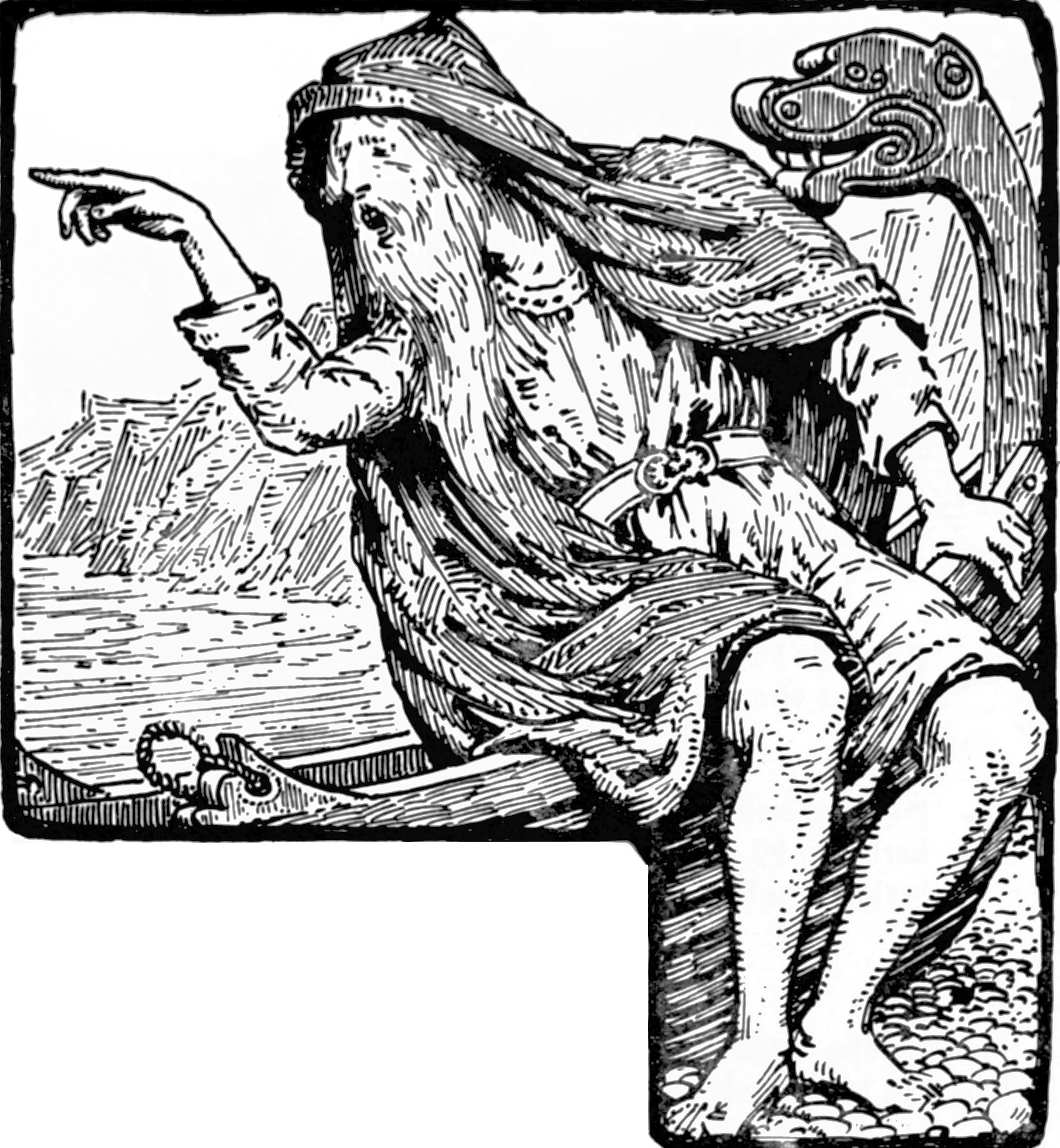
"Greybeard mocks Thor" (1908) by W. G. Collingwood.

Hárbarðsljóð (Old Norse: 'The Lay of Hárbarðr') is one of the poems of the Poetic Edda, found in the Codex Regius and AM 748 I 4to manuscripts. It is a flyting poem with figures from Norse Paganism. Hárbarðsljóð was first written down in the late 13th century but may have had an older history as an oral poem.

== Synopsis ==
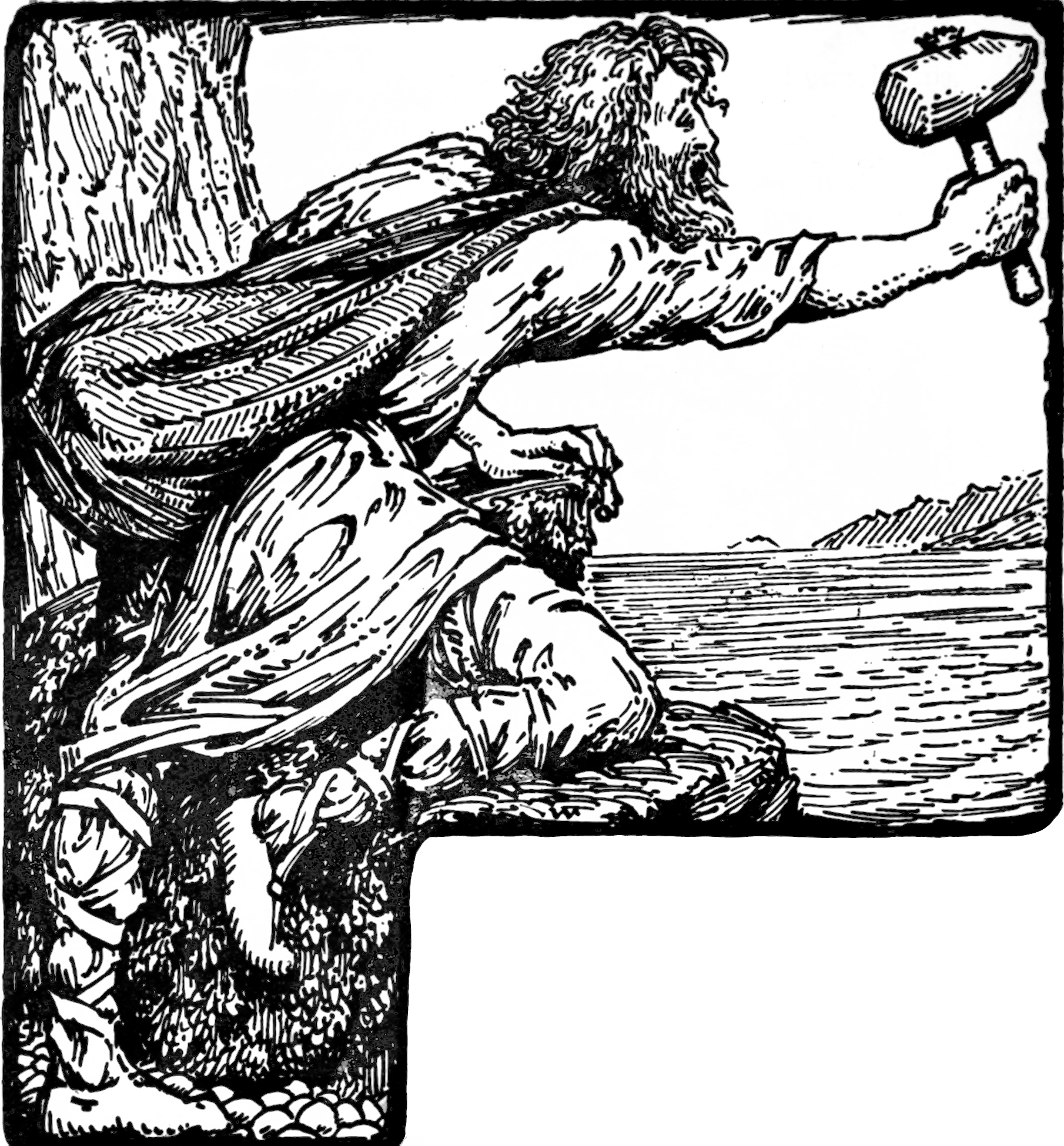
"Thor threatens Greybeard" (1908) by W. G. Collingwood.

In this poem, the ferryman Harbard and the god Thor compete in a flyting or verbal contest with one other. The ferryman Hárbarðr (Greybeard) is rude and obnoxious towards Thor who is returning to Asgard after a journey in Jötunheimr, the land of the jötnar. Hárbarðr obstructs his way and refuses him passage across a swollen river. He begins by saying that Thor dresses poorly (in a beggars clothes, without pants) and that his mother is dead. In the course of the poem, Harbard boasts of his sexual prowess, his magical and tactical abilities, asking Thor about his. Thor responds, telling how he defeated Giants. Ultimately, after mocking him at length, Harbard curses Thor and tells him to walk around.

== Structure ==
The poem is significantly less structured than most Eddic poems, and is predominantly written in a metric form known as málaháttr or "conversational style." However, other metrical forms are also to be discerned, while some of the text is pure prose. In the last decade, several scholars have concluded that the poem is an intentionally stylized version of the traditional flyting structure.

== Theories ==
Some early commentators, such as F. W. Bergmann and Viktor Rydberg argued that Hárbarð was in fact Loki. Although the name Hárbarð means "Grey beard," in the opening exchange of insults Thor addresses the ferryman as one would speak to a youthful servant. Some believe that Hárbarðr's confessed exploits also are allegedly more akin to those of Loki than Odin. However, Hárbarðr repeatedly boasts of his conquests of giantesses, as does Odin in Havamal. Loki in Lokasenna and Hárbarð in Hárbarðsljóð both accuse Thor's wife Sif of adultery, a charge that is never denied and may have been commonly known. They also speak identical half-lines, accusing Thor of being unmanly. Despite these arguments, this theory was rejected by later scholars such as Finnur Jónsson, Fredrick Sander, and Felix Niedner, in favor of identifying Hárbarð with Odin, based, among other things, on Odin's statement in Grimnismál 47 that Hárbarð is one of his by-names.
