= Málaháttr =

Metric composition style in Old Norse poetry

Málaháttr (Old Norse: [ˈmɑːlɑˌhɑtːz̠]) is a poetic metre in Old Norse poetry, which is usually described as "conversational style." It is similar to fornyrðislag except that there are more syllables in a line; usually five.

Poems with verses in this metre:

- Atlamál (the only eddic poem composed entirely in Málaháttr)
- Atlakviða (partly)
- Hárbarðsljóð (partly)
- Hávamál (partly)
- Hrafnsmál
