= Baldurs draumar =

Ballet by Geirr Tveitt

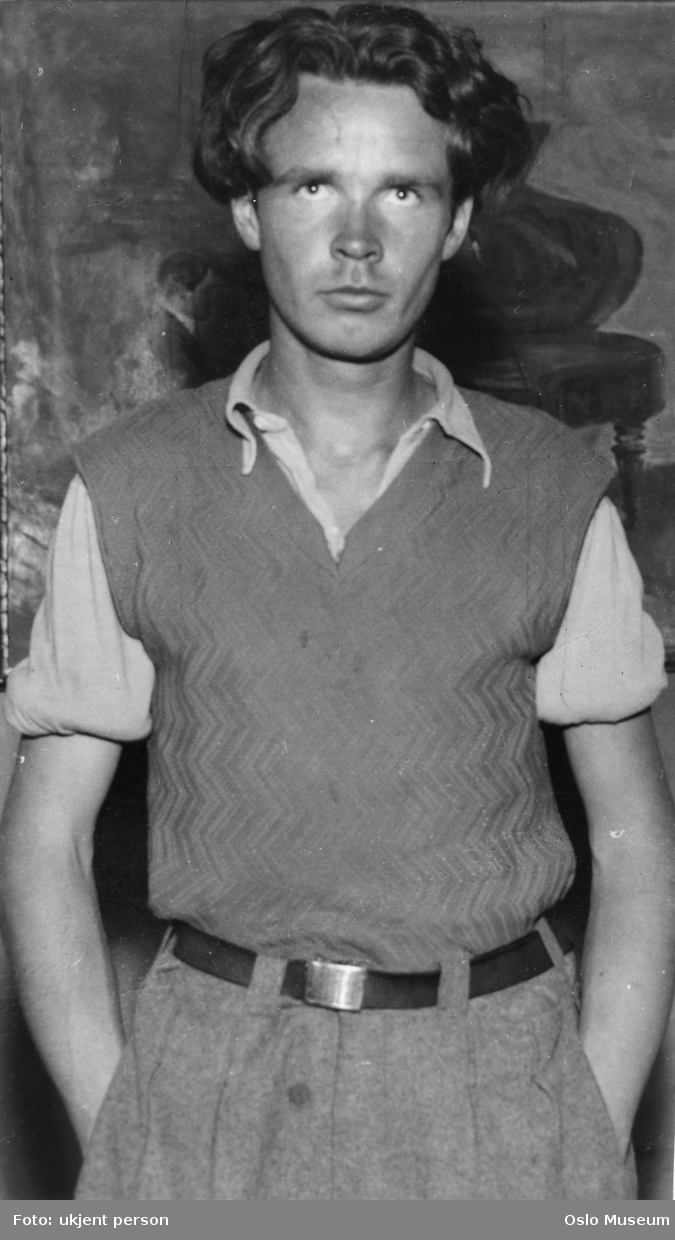
Geirr Tveitt in the 1930s

Baldur's Dreams (Norwegian: Baldurs draumar) is a ballet by the Norwegian composer Geirr Tveitt. It is loosely based on the poem Baldrs draumar from the Poetic Edda. It has never been staged as an actual ballet. The music was performed by a symphony orchestra in Oslo in 1938. The score was lost during World War II but reconstructed and rediscovered in the early 2000s.

== Background ==
Geirr Tveitt wrote Baldurs draumar when he was developing his own vision of a Nordic primitivism. He had come to support the neopagan group around Hans S. Jacobsen, which was ideologically National Socialist but against Adolf Hitler. Baldurs draumar is the work by Tveitt that most fully realizes the pagan ideas of this milieu. It was written for a large orchestra with twelve percussionists, some of which would perform on nine special made "Stone Age drums" tuned for the pentatonic scale.

== Synopsis ==
The ballet is in three acts. It tells the Norse myth of Baldr's death, recited by a narrator and loosely adapted from the poem Baldrs draumar from the Poetic Edda.

== Production history ==
Baldurs draumar has never been performed as an actual ballet, like Tveitt originally intended. A piano version was performed on 23 October 1935 at the Städtisches Kaufhaus in Leipzig and on 16 November 1935 at the Meistersaal in Berlin. The full ballet-score version premiered on 24 February 1938 at "Aulaen" of the University of Oslo. It was performed by the Oslo Philharmonic, enlarged to 100 performers, with Tveitt as conductor, Einar Tveito as narrator, Randi Helseth as soprano, Erling Krogh as tenor and Egil Nordsjø as bass. Selected parts were also performed in Copenhagen and Paris, before Tveitt sent the score to London where it was set to be performed at Covent Garden, although this did not come to be.

=== Disappearance and rediscovery ===
The score was believed to be lost in the bombings of London during World War II, and after the war Tveitt reconstructed parts of the work in a shortened orchestral version titled Solgud-symfonien [Sun God Symphony]. In 1970, Tveitt's home in Norheimsund burned down, and many of his scores were lost. In the late 1990s, the Russian composer Aleksey Rybnov began to reconstruct the score for Baldurs draumar, based on a recording of NRK's radio broadcast of the 1938 performance; Rybnov's work took three years to finish. In 2001, the composer Kaare Dyvik Husby looked through the collected remains from Tveitt's home and discovered the original ballet score. It was damaged by fire but possible to use to make corrections to Rybnov's reconstruction. The reconstruction premiered on 24 May 2002 at the Grieg Hall in Bergen, performed by the Stavanger Symphony Orchestra. BIS Records released a recording on CD in November 2003.

== Reception ==
In spite of Tveitt's claim that Baldurs draumar is "a wholly and completely Norse, Norwegian work", critics have received it as an impressionist and orientalist composition.

== Legacy ==
For Tveitt's 100th anniversary in 2008, Sondre H. Bjørgum directed the documentary film Baldurs Draumar for the Norwegian public broadcaster NRK. The film tells Tveitt's life story with Baldurs draumar as the common thread.
