= Nykken =

Poem by Geirr Tveitt

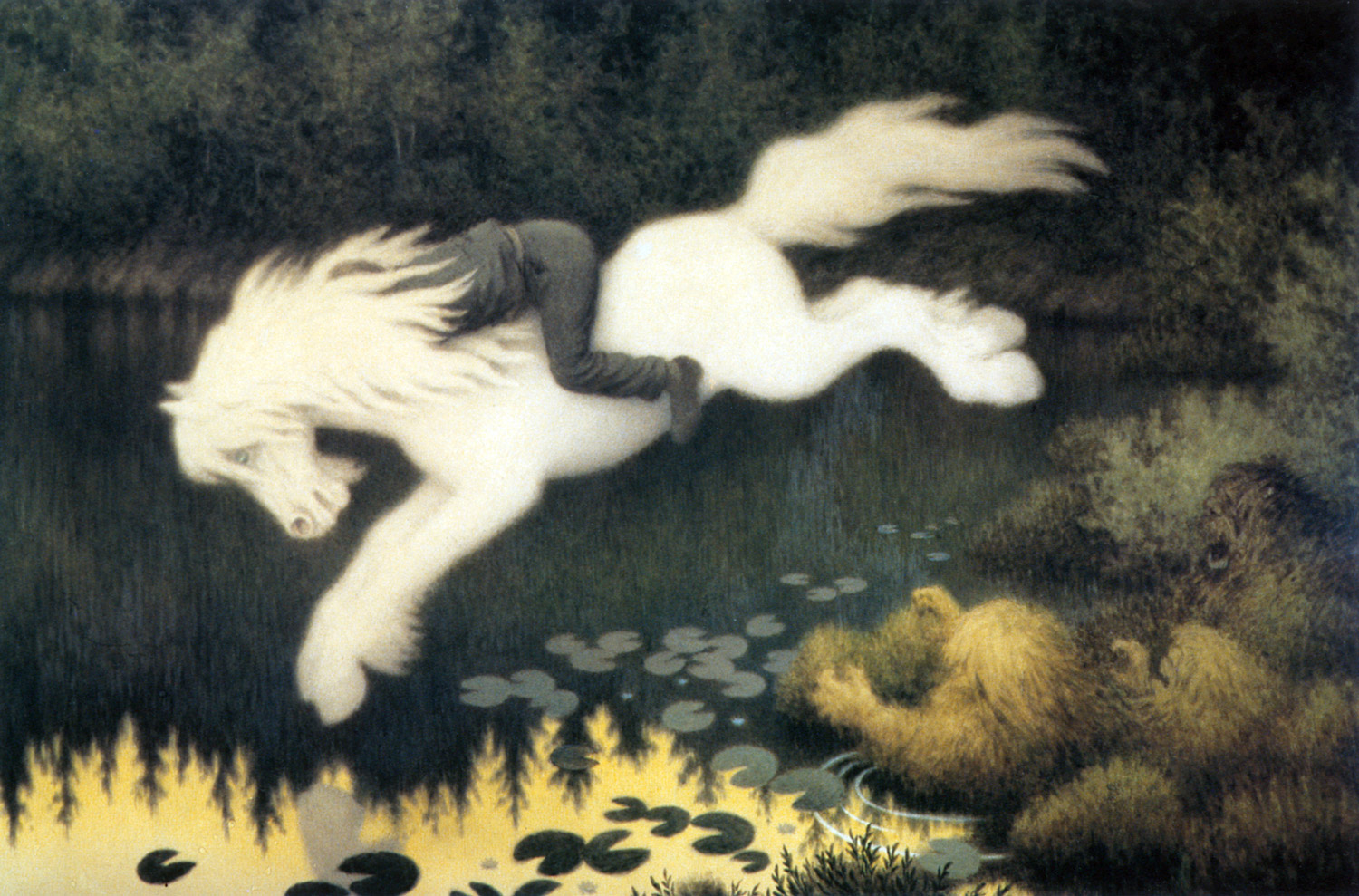
"Boy on a white horse" by Theodor Kittelsen.

Nykken is a symphonic poem composed by the Norwegian composer Geirr Tveitt in 1957.

== Composition ==
It is written for orchestra and several solo instruments, although they do not have any solo roles. It was written on demand for the Norwegian Broadcasting Corporation (NRK) and survived a fire in 1970 by being kept safe in their archives.

== Plot ==
It is built on a Norwegian legend about the sea-creature nøkken, which translates as "water sprite"., and is based on a story about him transforming into a beautiful, white horse and getting out of a silent pond. The horse lures a young boy onto its back and takes him with it back into the pond, generating a great disturbance in the normally so silent water. A normal performance lasts about 16–18 minutes.

== Meaning of the title ==
Nykken (Norwegian) or Näcken (Swedish), originating from Old Norse, is a spirit said to exist along the borders of water and land. People would often say prayers to the Nykken before swimming so that no harm would come to them.
