= AM 748 I 4to =

Icelandic manuscript source for Poetic Edda

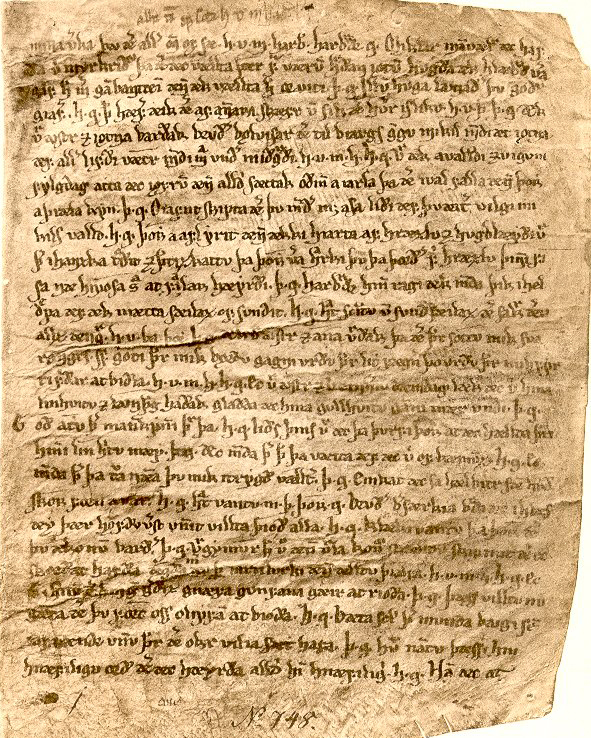

AM 748 I 4to is an Icelandic vellum manuscript fragment containing several Eddaic poems. It dates to the beginning of the 14th century. AM 748 I is split into two parts. AM 748 I a 4to is kept in the Arnamagnæan Institute in Copenhagen. AM 748 I b 4to is kept at the Árni Magnússon Institute for Icelandic Studies in Reykjavík. The six sheets which have been preserved of AM 748 I a 4to contain the following poems, all mythological.

- Grímnismál (complete)
- Hymiskviða (complete)
- Baldrs draumar (complete)
- Skírnismál (partial)
- Hárbarðsljóð (partial)
- Vafþrúðnismál (partial)
- Völundarkviða (only the beginning of the prose prologue)

AM 748 I a 4to is the only mediaeval manuscript to preserve Baldrs draumar. The other poems are also preserved in Codex Regius.
