= Midgard =

Location in Germanic cosmology

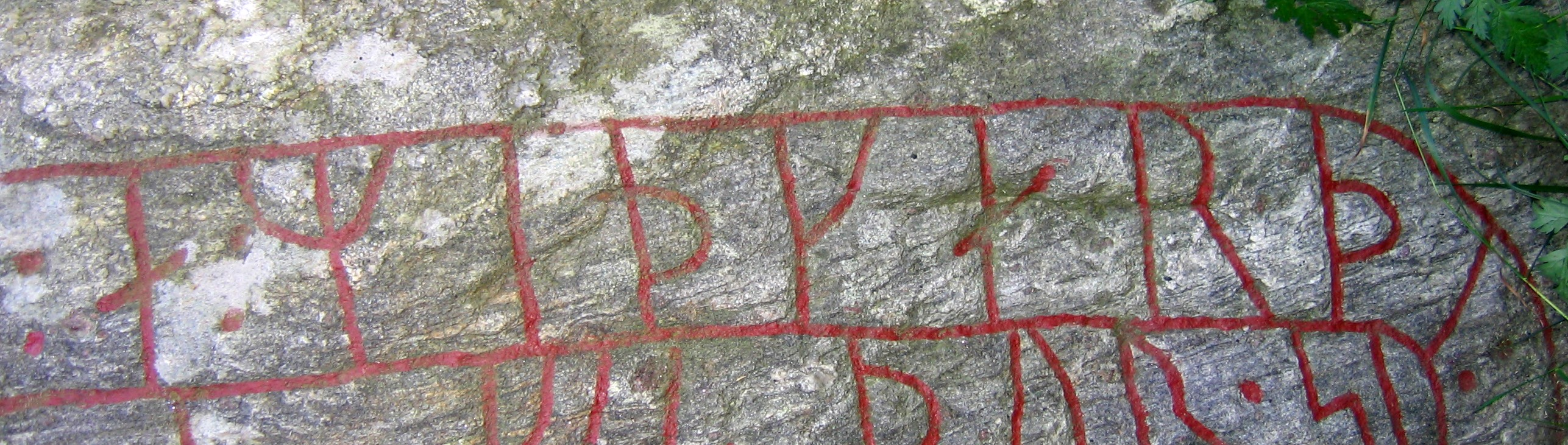
The runes a:miþkarþi, Old Norse á Miðgarði, meaning "in Midgard" – "in Middle Earth", on the Fyrby Runestone (Sö 56) in Södermanland, Sweden.

In Germanic cosmology, Midgard (an anglicised form of Old Norse Miðgarðr; Old English Middangeard, Old Saxon Middilgard, Old High German Mittilagart, and Gothic Midjun-gards; "middle yard", "middle enclosure") is the name for Earth (equivalent in meaning to the Greek term οἰκουμένη : oikouménē, "inhabited") inhabited by and known to humans in early Germanic cosmology. The Old Norse form plays a notable role in Norse cosmology.

== Etymology ==
The Old Norse name Miðgarðr is cognate with Gothic Midjungards (attested in the Gospel of Luke as a translation of the Greek οἰκουμένη), Old Saxon Middilgard (in Heliand), Old High German Mittilagart (in Muspilli), and Old English Middangeard. The latter, which appears in both prose and poetry, was transformed to Middellærd or Mittelerde ("Middle-earth") in Middle English literature.

All these forms stem from Common Germanic *Meðjana-garðaz, a compound of *meðjanaz ("middle") and *garðaz ("yard, enclosure"). In early Germanic cosmology, it stands alongside the term world (cf. Old English weorold, Old Saxon werold, Old High German weralt, Old Frisian wrald, Old Norse verǫld), itself from a Common Germanic compound *wira-alđiz ("man-age"), which refers to the inhabited world, i.e. the realm of humankind.

== Old Norse ==
In Norse mythology, Miðgarðr became applied to the wall around the world that the gods constructed from the eyebrows of the jötunn Ymir as a defense against the jötnar who lived in Jotunheim, east of Manheimr, the "home of men", a word used to refer to the entire world. The gods slew the jötunn Ymir, the first created being, and put his body into the central void of the universe, creating the world out of his body: his flesh constituting the land, his blood the oceans, his bones the mountains, his teeth the cliffs, his hairs the trees, and his brains the clouds. Ymir's skull was held by four dwarfs, Nordri, Sudri, Austri, and Vestri, who represent the four points on the compass and became the dome of heaven. The sun, moon, and stars were said to be scattered sparks in the skull.

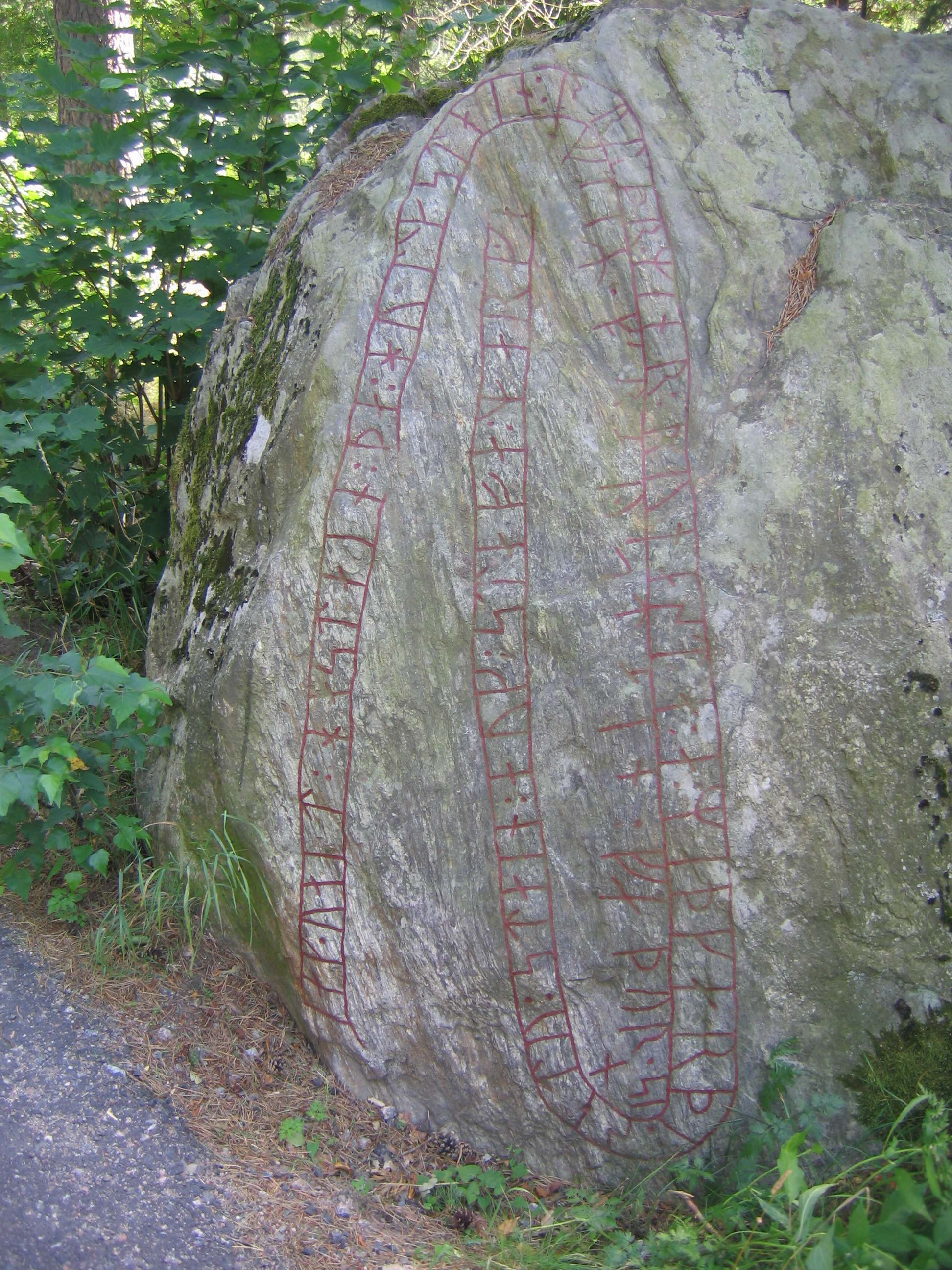
The Fyrby Runestone.

According to the Eddas, Midgard will be destroyed at Ragnarök, the battle at the end of the world. Jörmungandr (also known as the Midgard Serpent or World Serpent) will arise from the ocean, poisoning the land and sea with his venom and causing the sea to rear up and lash against the land. The final battle will take place on the plain of Vígríðr, following which Midgard and almost all life on it will be destroyed, with the earth sinking into the sea only to rise again, fertile and green when the cycle repeats and the creation begins again.

Although most surviving instances of the word Midgard refer to spiritual matters, it was also used in more mundane situations, as in the Viking Age runestone poem from the inscription Sö 56 from Fyrby:

Iak væit Hāstæin þā Holmstæin brø̄ðr, mænnr rȳnasta ā Miðgarði, sattu stæin auk stafa marga æftiʀ Frøystæin, faður sinn.	I know Hásteinn (and) Holmstein, brothers, the most rune-skilled men in Middle Earth, placed the stone and many letters in memory of Freysteinn, their father.

The Danish and Swedish form Midgård or Midgaard, the Norwegian Midgard or Midgård, as well as the Icelandic and Faroese form Miðgarður, all derive from the Old Norse term.

== English ==
The name middangeard occurs six times in the Old English epic poem Beowulf, and is the same word as Midgard in Old Norse. The term is equivalent in meaning to the Greek term Oikoumene, as referring to the known and inhabited world.

The concept of Midgard occurs many times in Middle English. The association with earth (OE eorðe) in Middle English middellærd, middelerde is by popular etymology; the modern English cognate of geard "enclosure" is yard. An early example of this transformation is from the Ormulum:

þatt ure Drihhtin wollde / ben borenn i þiss middellærd

that our Lord wanted / be born in this Middle-earth.

The usage of "Middle-earth" as a name for a setting was popularized by Old English scholar J. R. R. Tolkien in his The Lord of the Rings and other fantasy works; he was originally inspired by the references to middangeard and Éarendel in the Old English poem Crist A.

== Other languages ==
Mittilagart is mentioned in the 9th-century Old High German Muspilli (v. 54) meaning "the world" as opposed to the sea and the heavens:

muor varsuuilhit sih, suilizot lougiu der himil,
mano uallit, prinnit mittilagart

Sea is swallowed, flaming burn the heavens,
Moon falls, Midgard burns

Middilgard is also attested in the Old Saxon Heliand:

oƀar middilgard,
endi that he mahti allaro manno gihwes

Over the middle earth;
And all men He could help

== See also ==
- Upper world (Greek mythology) – Location in Greek mythology (Ancient Greek equivalent to Midgard, the world of the living).
- Ashihara no Nakatsukuni – Japanese mythological place (Shinto equivalent to Midgard, the world of the living).
