= Dragaredokko =

Opera by Geirr Tveitt

Dragaredokko is the name of an opera by the Norwegian composer Geirr Tveitt, performed in 1940. The entire score was destroyed in a fire in 1970, but an incomplete piano transcription still exists in the National Library of Norway.
