= Hagen (legend) =

Character in German legend and Wagner's Ring Cycle

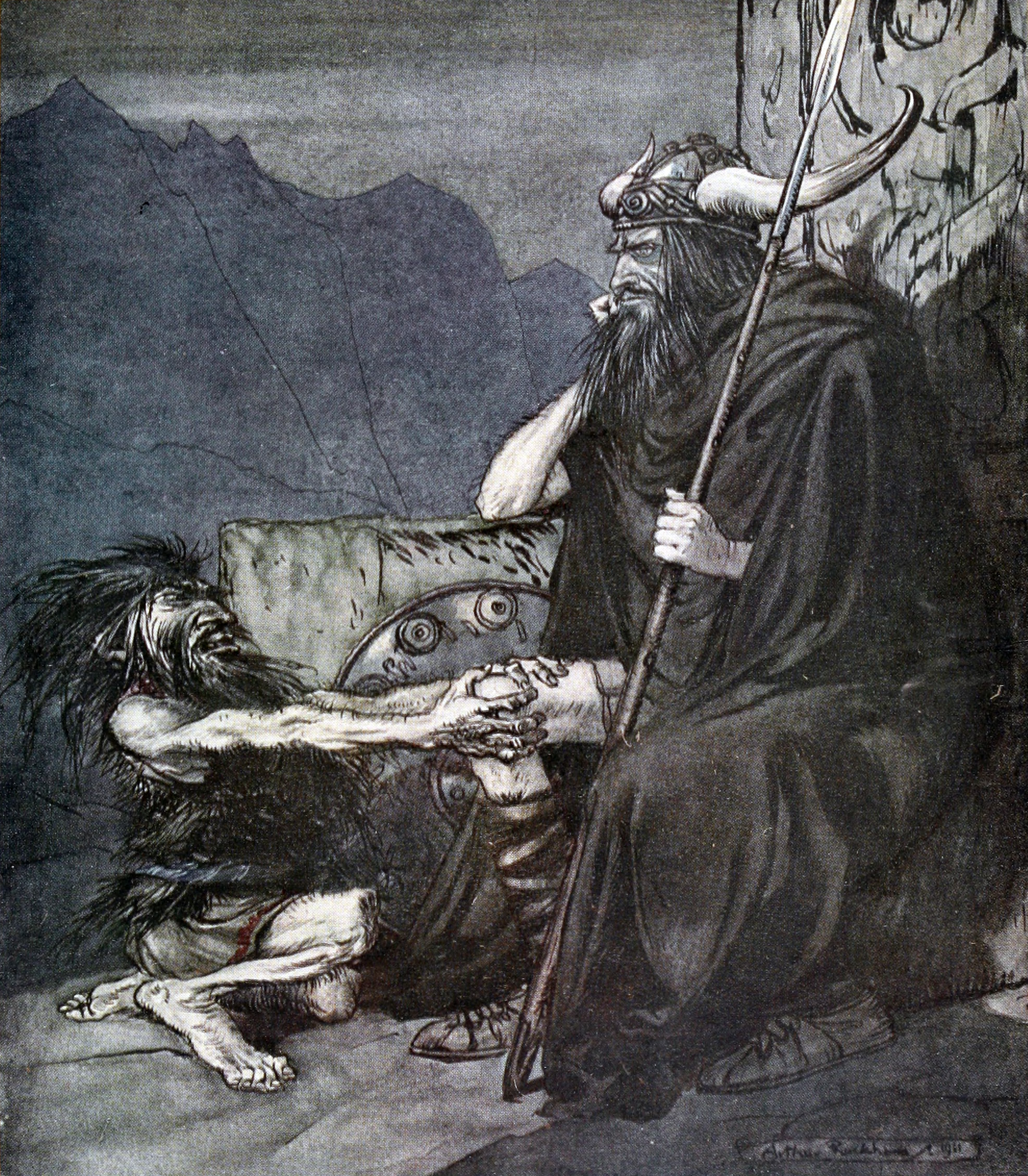
The Dwarf Alberich talks to Hagen, by Arthur Rackham.

Hagen (German form) or Högni (Old Norse Hǫgni, often anglicized as Hogni, Old English Hagena, Latin Hagano) is a Burgundian warrior in Germanic heroic legend about the Burgundian kingdom at Worms. Hagen is often identified as a brother or half-brother of King Gunther (Old Norse Gunnarr). In the Nibelungenlied he is nicknamed "from Tronje".

== Etymology of the epithet "Tronje" ==
Of the main manuscripts of the Nibelungenlied, the chief representatives of versions B and C use the spelling "Tronege": "from Tronege Hagene", "Hagen of Tronege", "geborn of Tronege", "helt of Tronege". The A version usually writes "Trony" (also "Troni" and "Tronie"). "Tronje" is the appropriate modern German form. In the B and C versions, the name is in the dative case, with the nominative being "Troneg"; "Tronje", although common, is therefore a mistake.

All attempts to interpret Hagen's name or home are highly speculative. Although the Nibelungenlied has a historic center, it was written down only centuries later, in 1200, and therefore incorporated the author's Medieval knowledge and intentions. There are suggestions that the epithet refers to more or less similar-sounding place names. However, names that have only a phonetic similarity but no meaningful link with the legend are rejected by scholars, since it is very likely that such connections are random and add nothing to the interpretation of the character. It is believed that the poet of the Nibelungenlied accepted Tronje as a real place name in the Burgundian kingdom; but it is questionable that he himself knew its exact location, since the story's many geographical mistakes suggest that his knowledge of the area around Worms was not particularly good.

Nevertheless, a link to Hagen has been discussed regarding the following places:

- The suffix "of Tronje" could signify a derivation from the Greek "Troy", since it was fashionable in late antiquity and early medieval Europe to ascribe such ancestors to oneself. With this ascription, people could also connect themselves to the ancient Romans.
- "Tronje" could also be the Colonia Ulpia Traiana, a Roman city close to modern Xanten, and the area from which Siegfried came. This would explain Hagen's seemingly profound knowledge of incidents and deeds from Siegfried's youth.
- The Belgian city of Drongen in Ghent was known in Latin as "Truncinas" and had various Romanesque spellings over the following centuries: "Truncinas" (820–822), "Truncinis" (1040) and "Troncinium" (1198). Today, its French name is "Tronchiennes", which sounds almost like "Tronje". Dutch authors place the Kudrun saga here since it contains townscape and landscape names such as "Wulpe Tenenbaums" (Tenemarke, Tenelant). According to this interpretation, Hagen of the Nibelungenlied could be identical with the Hagen of the Kudrun.
- Similarly, the name of the small village of Castle Dhronecken in the Hunsrück Mountains sounds like "Tronje"; in the Middle Ages its name was "Troneck" and it lay in the historic Kingdom of the Burgundians. Not too far away, there are place names that hint at further figures from the Nibelungenlied, especially Hagen's relative Ortwin of Metz and his colleagues Hunold and Volker von Alzey. Based on the castles around Dhronecken, Ortwin can be assigned to Metz, Hagen to Dhronecken, Hunold to Hunoldispetra (now Hunolstein in Morbach), and Volker to Alzey. These are places that travelers would pass on the way from Xanten via Metz and Worms to Passau.

== Nibelungenlied ==
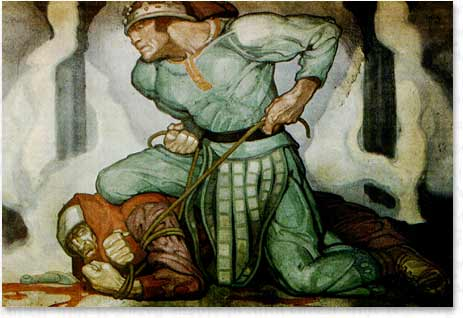
Dietrich von Bern Ties up Hagen; by Karl Schmoll von Eisenwerth (1911)

In the Nibelungenlied, he is called Hagen of Tronje.

Some versions indicate that Hagen is the "Oheim" of the three kings, i.e. their mother Ute's brother (or brother-in-law, following a now outdated German dual model of indicating and differing between matrilineal and patrilineal kinship). Some count him as Gunter's, Gernot's and Giselher's "uncle" (originally a father's brother or brother-in-law, as opposed to "Oheim"), so this may more likely hint to an old custom – nearly, but not yet completely outdated – where people close to a family take over the role of a fatherly / motherly friend and acquire the "honorary title" of an uncle or aunt (see the German expression 'Nennonkel/-tante' – 'termed uncle / -aunt'). In the German traditions, Hagen is especially grim, implacable, and violent, and in two accounts, one-eyed.

According to the Thidreks saga, Hagen was Gunnar's (senior?) half-brother. Not fully human, though, as being fathered by an elf, on the king's wife while the king was away. The Thidreks saga tells that it was Walter of Waskensten (Walter of Aquitaine) who put out Hagen's eye in a fight.

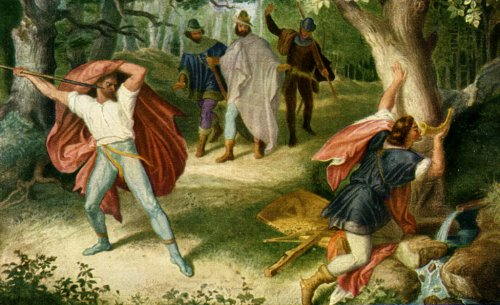
Hagen takes aim at Siegfried's back with a spear in an 1847 painting by Julius Schnorr von Carolsfeld.

In these forementioned accounts, it is Hagen who kills the hero Siegfried during a hunt, wounding him on the only part of his body which was not invulnerable. This version of the character is the most widely known and appears in Wagner's Der Ring des Nibelungen; Generalfeldmarschall Paul von Hindenburg would reference this telling in his 1920 memoir Aus meinem Leben ('From My Life'), as part of a section comparing the event to Germany's loss in World War I, which he had often blamed on domestic politicians per the then-prevalent stab-in-the-back myth.

In Norse tradition, Hagen's counterpart Högni is less extreme and the actual slayer of Sigurd (the Norse counterpart to Siegfried) is Gutthorm, a younger brother of Gunnar and Högni, who does so when egged on by his elder brothers.

In German accounts, Gunther and Hagen, along with Kriemhild herself, are the final casualties of the fall of the Nibelungs. Hagen refuses to reveal the hiding place of the Nibelung treasure to Kriemhild as long as his king Gunther lives. When Gunther is slain, the mortally wounded Hagen continues his refusal with sure knowledge that Gunther cannot now weaken and betray the secret, being decapitated by Kriemhild with Balmung, Siegfried's sword which Hagen had stolen after his death.

== Norse accounts ==
In Norse accounts, however, it is Gunnar who refuses to tell the secret to Attila the Hun as long as Högni lives, and so brings about Högni's death. Högni laughs as Attila has his heart cut out.

In Atlamál, Hniflung, a son of Hagen/Högni, avenges his father's death and the deaths of his kin, together with his aunt Guðrún. This work also states that Hogni had a wife named Kostbera and two other sons: Solar and Snævar. The Drap Niflunga mentions a fourth son named Gjuki (named after Hogni's father).

== Wagnerian mythology ==
In the opera Götterdämmerung, part of The Ring Cycle, Hagen is portrayed as the half-brother of Gunther and Gutrune, illegitimately fathered by the dwarf Alberich. He is similarly depicted as evil and cunning, acting under the influence of his father and for his own interests.

The great German bass Kurt Moll pointed out that Hagen's music is unique in the bass repertoire: it requires a shouting, blaring vocal technique which risks damaging the singer's voice; only very large-voiced, powerful singers can sing it.
