= A Hundred Hardanger Tunes =

Collection of folk songs arranged for orchestra by Geirr Tveitt

A Hundred Hardanger Tunes (Op. 151, Norwegian: Hundrad hardingtonar for orkester) is a collection of folk songs from the Hardanger region of Norway arranged for orchestra by the composer Geirr Tveitt between 1954 and 1963. Of the originally planned 100 tunes, 4 suites with a total of 60 songs are extant.

== Background ==
Geirr Tveitt (1908 – 1981) began to collect folk songs from the Hardanger region of Norway in the mid 1930s and continued throughout World War II. Of the more than 1000 tunes he collected, he first arranged 50 for piano as his opus 150. He then undertook the larger project of opus 151, A Hundred Hardanger Tunes for orchestra. Some of the songs are entirely Tveitt's own compositions. The songs are arranged into suites, of which number three (31–45) has been lost and number five (61–75) is the last, giving a total of 60 extant songs.

== Suites ==
=== Suite nr. 1, 1–15 ===
Adapted from a suite of twelve songs arranged for opus 150 in 1950. Composed in its final form in the autumn of 1954 and first performed in 1954 by the conductor Odd Grüner-Hegge and the Oslo Philharmonic.

1. Velkomne med æra
2. Flyteljod
3. Fagraste viso pao joræ
4. Moltor og myrabær
5. Stavkyrkjestev
6. Å naoe meg no fø mi tusta
7. Upskoka
8. Syrgjeleg song um ein tom brennevinsdunk
9. Langeleiklåt
10. Stølstone
11. Hastverksbrudlaup
12. Guds godhet og Guds storhet
13. Vise folks folkevisa um visse folk
14. Storskrytarstev
15. Siste farvel

=== Suite nr. 2 Fjellstev nr. 16–30 ===
Composed in 1955 and first performed on 7 June 1955 at the Bergen Festival, by the conductor Odd Grüner-Hegge and the Filharmonisk Selskap.

16. Langt, langt te fjells te Turid
17. Med ulvar og rein i uver pao viddæ
18. Høno, hunden, kjyræ og hesten
19. Fjell-lokk
20. Med sterkt øl te fjells
21. Seljeflyta yver stillt fjellvatn
22. Gamle-Erik sin klagesong
23. Rjupo pao Folgafodne
24. Å! høyre du songjen i fossaduren?
25. Huldraslaotten hans Haltelars
26. Songjen inne i Huldrahaugjen
27. Eldebrand i skjegget
28. Munnharpeljod
29. Fjedlmansjento up i lid
30. Eg saog meg ut so vida

=== Suite nr. 3, 31–45 (lost) ===
Never performed. According to Tveitt, the songs were about farming and old customs. The scores were lost when Tveitt's home burned down in 1970.

=== Suite nr. 4 Brudlaupssuiten nr. 46-60 ===
Composed in 1958 and first performed the same year in Bergen by Odd Grüner-Hegge and the Filharmonisk Selskap.

46. Du
47. Friarføter
48. Eit gamalt sel fortel
49. Belaresveinen
50. Pao veg te brudlaupsgarden
51. Krunebrure
52. Graot og laott aot ein gamadlu baot
53. So stillt dei ror pao Glitrefjord
54. Kjømeistervisa
55. Dei kvite skaut i sumarbrisen bylgjer
56. Rikje-Ragna med jarnhendene
57. Skottrarar
58. Bruradrammane
59. Fyllesnakk
60. Haringøl

=== Suite nr. 5 Trolltonar nr. 61–75 ===
First performed in 1963 in Bergen by the conductor Arvid Fladmoe and Harmonien.

61. Trollstemt fele
62. Huldrebufora
63. Huldre-bånsull
64. Huldre-nøring
65. Bytingen
66. Folgafodne fortel ingjenting
67. Trollsylvet
68. Galdresong
69. Krokharpa som kunde tala
70. Gardvoren dansar
71. Nykken spelar
72. Tussmyrkre (first title: Frå Fykse)
73. Tusseflyta
74. Dvergmålet
75. Domedag

Tveitt made sketches for more suites, but they were lost in the fire in 1970.

== Discography ==
Simax Classics released a recording of suite one in 1989, performed by Per Dreier and the Royal Philharmonic Orchestra. BIS Records released suites one and two on CD in December 1998, titled 100 Folk-tunes from Hardanger and performed by the conductor Ole Kristian Ruud and the Stavanger Symphony Orchestra. In July 2001 and January 2002, Naxos released two CDs with performances by the conductor Bjarte Engeset and the Royal Scottish National Orchestra, under the title A Hundred Hardanger Tunes. The first CD features suites one and four, and the second features suites two and five.
