= Old Norse poetry =

Range of verse forms written in Old Norse

Old Norse poetry encompasses a range of verse forms written in the Old Norse language, during the period from the 8th century to as late as the far end of the 13th century. Old Norse poetry is associated with the area now referred to as Scandinavia. Much Old Norse poetry was originally preserved in oral culture, but the Old Norse language ceased to be spoken and later writing tended to be confined to history rather than for new poetic creation, which is normal for an extinct language. Modern knowledge of Old Norse poetry is preserved by what was written down. Most of the Old Norse poetry that survives was composed or committed to writing in Iceland, after refined techniques for writing (such as the use of vellum, parchment paper, pens, and ink) were introduced—seemingly contemporaneously with the introduction of Christianity: thus, the general topic area of Old Norse poetry may be referred to as Old Icelandic poetry in literature.

There are also around 122 verses preserved in Swedish rune inscriptions, 54 in Norwegian and 12 in Danish. (See Eggjum stone.)

Poetry played an important role in the social and religious world of the Vikings. In Skáldskaparmál, Snorri Sturluson, recounts the myth of how Odin brought the mead of poetry to Asgard. Poetry is referred to in such terms as 'the drink of the raven-god (= Odin)' even in the oldest preserved poetry, which is an indicator of its significance within the ancient Scandinavian culture.

Old Norse poetry developed from the common Germanic alliterative verse, and as such has many commonalities with Old English, Old Saxon, and Old High German poetry, including alliteration, poetic circumlocutions termed kennings, and an expansive vocabulary of poetic synonyms, termed heiti.

Old Norse poetry is conventionally, and somewhat arbitrarily, split into two types: Eddaic poetry (also known as Eddic poetry) and Skaldic poetry. Eddaic poetry refers to poems on themes of mythology or ancient heroes, composed in simpler meters (see below) and with anonymous authors. Most of the Eddaic poems are preserved in the Codex Regius manuscript, but a few others survive in manuscripts like the fragmentary AM 748 I 4to. On the other hand, Skaldic poetry was usually written as praise for living kings and nobles, in more intricate meters and by known authors, known as skalds.

== Types of poetry ==
There are various types of Old Norse poetry which have been preserved. Of particular interest to scholars are the Skaldic and Eddic lays, or poems. However, also of interest are occasional verse from other sources. Skaldic and Eddic works have many commonalities besides being written in Old Norse, such as alliteration; however, scholars usually distinguish the two based on certain characteristics.

=== Distinction between Skaldic and Eddic poetry ===
Scholarly distinction between Eddic and Skaldic works largely derives both from differing manuscript traditions and their typical matter and style.

==== Manuscript sources ====
One major distinction between Skaldic and Eddic poetry derives from the manuscript sources of the surviving known works. The large majority of works described as "Eddic" are found only in the Codex Regius, while a few of the poems found in it also survive in independent recensions in the AM 748 I 4to manuscript. Many verses from these Eddic poems are also quoted as evidence in the Prose Edda. Some poems not found in the early Eddic manuscripts are still considered to be "Eddic" due to their style. Examples include the "Lay of Ríg" from the Codex Wormianus; the "Lay of Hyndla" from the Flateyjar-bók; and, the "Lay of Svipdag", which is only found in later, paper manuscripts (rather than vellum). Together, all of these poems are grouped under the somewhat fluid term the Poetic Edda.

==== Matter and style ====
Compared to the main skaldic style, the Eddic lays tend to be differentiated by three characteristics: the material deals with the mythology, ancient heroes, and ethics of the ancient Norse. Furthermore, the Eddic style is characterized by relative simplicity in terms of style and meter and, "like the later folk songs and ballads, they are anonymous and objective, never betraying the feelings or attitudes of their authors." In contrast, the skaldic poetry tends to concern itself with contemporary events and personalities, although also sometimes dealing with or alluding to myth and legend; skaldic poetry avoids direct narration; and, it is often known who the authors of the skaldic verses are along with their dates, unlike the Eddic poetry.

== Metrical forms ==
Old Norse poetry has many metrical forms (Old Norse: hættir). They range from the ancient and relatively simple fornyrðislag ('air of ancient words'), closely related to the Old English meter, to the innovative and complex dróttkvætt (Old Norse: dróttkvæðr háttr 'court-spoken meter').

The metrical forms are divided into two groups: the Eddic forms, of which there are three, and the Skaldic forms, of which there are many more. All Norse verse forms share similarities both with each other and with other non-Norse forms of Germanic alliterative verse; such as, alliteration of stressed and grammatically important syllables, line lengths determined by the number of stressed syllables (called "lifts"), and the linking of half-lines into full lines or couplets by means of alliteration.

Unique for Norse meter is a division of poems into stanzas (rather than the stichic Old English metre) with fixed numbers of lines, generally four. Another difference between the Norse system and the general Germanic pattern is that the Norse poets, unlike the Old English poets, tended to treat each "couplet", or Germanic line, as a complete syntactic unit, avoiding enjambment where a thought begun on one line continues through the following lines; only seldom do they begin a new sentence in the second half-line. It is not uncommon for modern editors to print each half-line of Old Norse poetry on a new line, rather than printing two half-lines on the same line separated by a cæsura, as is traditionally done for instance in Old English verse.

=== Eddic metrical forms ===
Eddic, or Eddaic, poetry is for the most part composed either in fornyrðislag ('air of ancient words') or ljóðaháttr ('chant-meter'); a third, less common meter is málaháttr ('speech-meter').

==== Epic meter (Fornyrðislag) ====
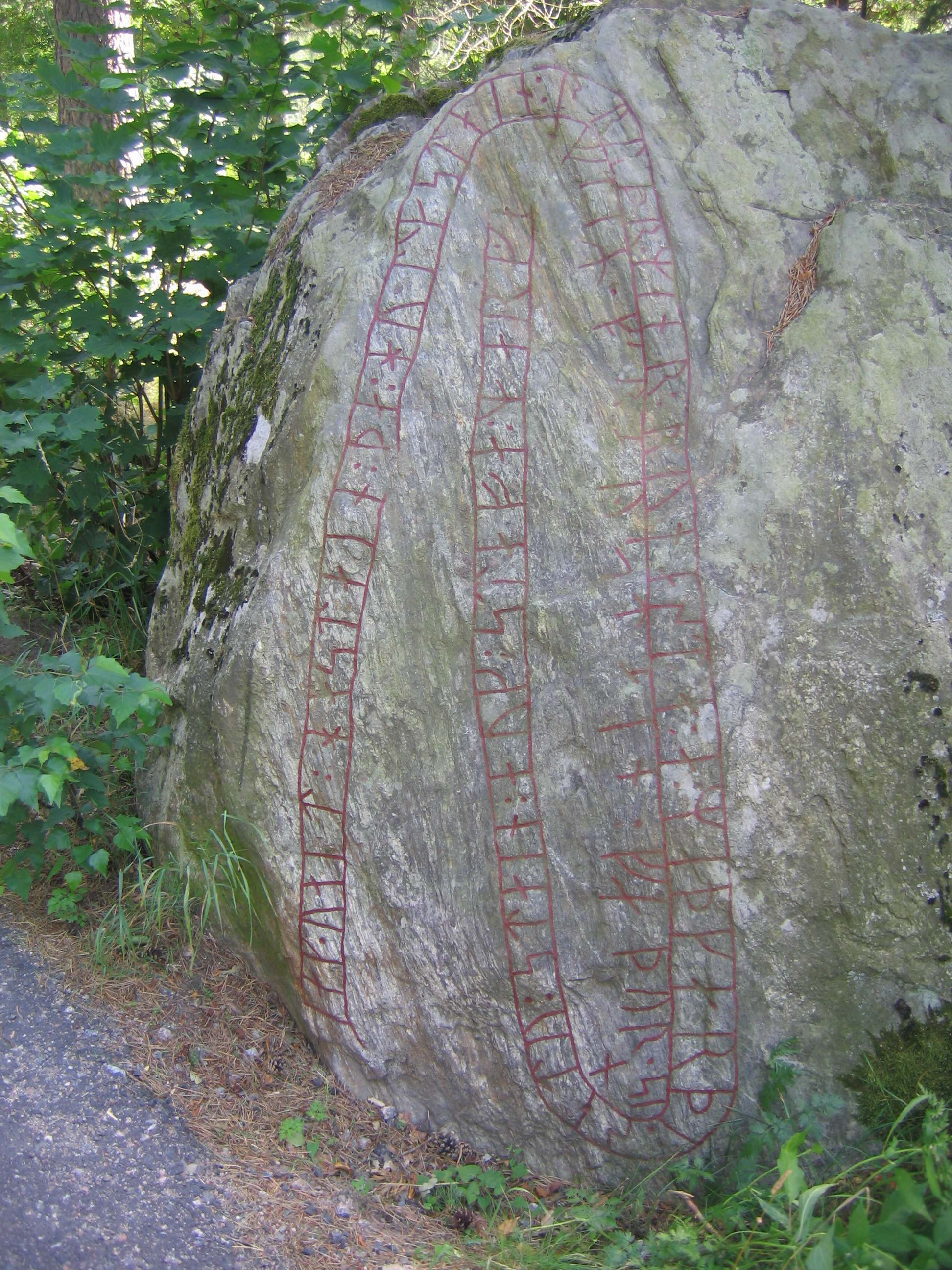
The Fyrby Runestone tells in fornyrðislag that two brothers were "the most rune-skilled brothers in Middle Earth."

Fornyrðislag ('air of ancient words') is the most commonly used Eddic metre and is often used for narrative poetry. It is the closest to other Germanic alliterative verse, including the Old English metre of Beowulf, and is found on runestones and in the Old Norse Poetic Edda. Its use continued in Iceland into late medieval sagnakvæði poetry.

Like all other Norse metre fornyrðislag is divided into stanzas of four full lines or couplets, each consisting of two half-lines. Each half-line has two stressed syllables, also known as "lifts", with a somewhat arbitrary number of other syllables. Through the use of alliteration, half-lines join into couplets. Generally, in the first half-line (the 'a-verse'), both "lifts", or stressed syllables alliterate—these are the "supports" (stuðlar). In the second line of any given couplet (the 'b-verse'), only one of the two stressed syllables is alliterated, usually the first—this is the "head-stave" (hǫfuðstafr).

This example is from the Waking of Angantyr:

Vaki, Angantýr! vekr þik Hervǫr,
eingadóttir ykkr Sváfu!
Selðu ór haugi hvassan mæki
þann's Svafrlama slógu dvergar.

Translation:

Awaken, Angantyr! Hervor awakens you;
your only daughter by Sváfa!
Yield up from the mound the sharp sword
the one which dwarves forged for Svafrlami.

==== Speech meter (málaháttr) ====
Málaháttr ('meter of speeches') is essentially a variant of fornyrðislag which adds an unstressed syllable to each half-line, making six to eight (sometimes up to ten) unstressed syllables per line. This meter is similar to that used in the Old Saxon Heliand. It is sometimes combined with ljóðaháttr in the same composition.

==== Chant meter (Ljóðaháttr) ====
Ljóðaháttr ('chant-' or 'ballad' metre) is also organized into four-line stanzas. The first and third lines are typical lines of Germanic alliterative verse with four lifts and two or three alliterations, separated into two half-lines with cæsura, but with somewhat looser restrictions than fornyrðislag (for instance allowing two-syllable lines); the second and fourth lines have three lifts and two alliterations, and no cæsura. This example is from Freyr's lament in Skírnismál:

Lǫng es nótt, lǫng es ǫnnur,
hvé mega ek þreyja þrjár?
Opt mér mánaðr minni þótti
en sjá halfa hýnótt.

Translation:

Long is one night, long is the next;
how can I yearn for three?
A month has often seemed less to me
than this half night of longing.

Because of its structure, which comprises clearly defined rhythmic stanzas, ljóðaháttr lends itself to dialogue and discourse. There were a number of variant stanza forms based on ljóðaháttr, including galdralag ('meter of spells'), which adds a fifth short (three-lift) line at the end of the stanza; in this form, the fifth line usually mirrors the fourth.

=== Skaldic metrical forms ===
The Skaldic forms were so called because of their use in more elaborate court poetry composed by the elite poets known as skalds. In Skaldic poetry the structures used tend to be complex, and more highly derived from the common Germanic poetic tradition. Around a hundred meters are known, many only from Snorri Sturluson's Háttatal.

One of the simplest skaldic meters was kviðuháttr ('meter of lays'), a strict variant of fornyrðislag where the first half-line must contain exactly 3, the second exactly 4 syllables. It was used in genealogical poems such as Þjóðólfr ór Hvíni's Ynglingatal and Eyvindr Skáldaspillir's Háleygjatal. Other Skaldic meters, such as dróttkvætt and Hrynhenda were more complex, involving assonance and even end-rhyme.

==== Courtly Meter (Dróttkvætt) ====
Drawing of the copper Sigtuna box with a dróttkvætt verse written in the runic alphabet

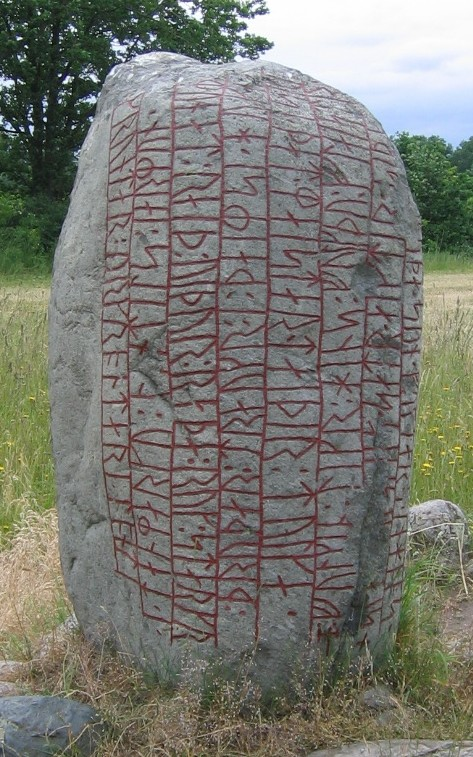
The Karlevi Runestone contains a dróttkvætt poem in memory of a chieftain.

Dróttkvætt (meaning ‘courtly metre’,) added internal rhymes (so called hendings) to its stanza structures. The resulting verse form goes well beyond the requirements of Germanic alliterative verse and strongly resembles Celtic (Irish and Welsh) verse forms. The dróttkvætt stanza had eight half-lines, each having usually three lifts and almost invariably six syllables. Although other stress patterns appear, the verse is predominantly trochaic, and the last two syllables in each line have to form a trochee (there are a few specific forms which utilize a stressed word at line-end, such as in some docked forms). In the very earliest dróttkvætt poetry (like the Ragnarsdrápa or Haustlǫng), the metrical requirements were somewhat looser, but by the 10th century the following specific requirements obtained for odd-numbered and even-numbered lines.

In the odd-numbered lines (equivalent to the a-verse of the traditional alliterative line):

- Two of the stressed syllables alliterate with each other.
- Two of the stressed syllables share partial rhyme of consonants (which was called skothending) with dissimilar vowels (e.g. r**id**er and l**oad**ing).

In the even lines (equivalent to the b-verse of the traditional alliterative line):

- The first stressed syllable must alliterate with the alliterative stressed syllables of the previous line.
- Two of the stressed syllables rhyme (aðalhending, e.g. h**at**ing and b**ait**ed), not necessarily at the end of the word (e.g. t**orch**ing and **orch**ard).

The requirements of the verse form were so demanding that enjambment and parenthetical phrases became very frequent, with several threads of syntax sometimes running in parallel. According to the Fagrskinna collection of sagas, King Harald III of Norway uttered these lines of dróttkvætt at the Battle of Stamford Bridge; the internal assonances are underlined and the alliterations emboldened:

Krjúpum vér fyr vápna,
(val-teigs), brǫkun eigi,
(svá bauð Hildr), at hjaldri,
(hald-orð), í bug skjaldar.
Hǫ́tt bað mik, þar's mǿttusk,
'm'en-skorð bera forðum,
hlakkar íss ok hausar,
hjalm-stall í gný malma.

‘In battle, we do not creep behind a shield before the din of weapons; so commanded the valkyrie of the hawk-land [arm > noblewoman], true of words. She who wore the necklace formerly bade me to bear my helmet-prop [head] high in the clangour of blades where the battle-ice [a gleaming sword] encounters skulls.’

The bracketed words in the poem (svá bauð hald-orð Hildr val-teigs ‘so commanded the valkyrie of the hawk-land, true of words’) are syntactically separate but interspersed within the rest of the first four lines. The elaborate kennings manifested here are also practically necessary in this complex and demanding form, as much to solve metrical difficulties as for the sake of vivid imagery. Intriguingly, the saga claims that Harald improvised these lines after he gave a lesser performance in fornyrðislag; Harald judged that verse bad and then offered this one in the more demanding form. While the exchange may be fictionalized, the scene illustrates the regard in which the form was held.

Most dróttkvætt poems that survive appear in one or another of the Norse sagas, especially the Kings' sagas and sagas of Icelanders. A subcategory of the latter are the biographies of Skaldic poets like Hallfreðr vandræðaskáld (Hallfreðar saga) or Kormákr Ögmundarson (Kormáks saga).

==== Flowing Verse (Hrynhenda) ====
Hrynhenda or hrynjandi háttr ('the flowing verse-form') is a later development of dróttkvætt with eight syllables per line instead of six, with the similar rules of assonance and alliteration, although each hrynhent-variant shows particular subtleties. It is first attested around 985 in the so-called Hafgerðingadrápa of which a single four-line stanza survives. Note that the third line is, in fact, over-alliterated. There should be exactly two alliterants in the odd-numbered lines (alliteration bolded and hendings underlined):

Mínar biðk at munka reyni
meinalausan farar beina;
heiðis haldi hárar foldar
hallar dróttinn of mér stalli.

‘I ask the tester of monks (God) for a safe journey; the lord of the palace of the high ground (God — here we have a kenning in four parts) keep the seat of the falcon (hand) over me.’

The author of this stanza was said to be a Christian from the Hebrides, who composed the poem asking God to keep him safe at sea. The metre gained some popularity in courtly poetry, as the rhythm may sound more majestic than dróttkvætt.

We learn much about this meter in the Hattatal: Snorri gives for certain at least three different variant-forms of hrynhenda. These long-syllabled lines are explained by Snorri as being extra-metrical in most cases: the "main" form never has alliteration or assonance in the first 2 syllables of the odd-lines (i.e., assonances always coming at the fourth-syllable), and the even-lines never have assonance on the fifth/sixth syllables (i.e.: they cannot harbor assonance in these places because they extra-metrical), the following couplet shows the paradigm:

Tiggi snýr á ógnar áru
(Undgagl veit þat) sóknar hagli''.

[Note the juxtaposition of alliteration and assonance of the even-line]

Then, the variant-forms show unsurprising dróttkvætt patterns overall; the main difference being that the first trochee of the odd-lines are technically not reckoned as extrametrical since they harbor alliteration, but the even-lines' extra-metrical feature is more or less as the same. The 2nd form is the "troll-hrynjandi": in the odd-lines the alliteration is moved to the first metrical position (no longer "extra-metrical") while the assonance remains the same (Snorri seems to imply that frumhending, which is placing a assonance on the first syllable of any line, is preferably avoided in all these forms: the assonances are always preferred as oddhending, "middle-of-the-line assonances") — in the even-lines the assonance and alliteration are not juxtaposed, and this is a key feature of its distinction (the significant features only are marked in bold below):

Stála kendi steykvilundum
styrjar valdi raudu falda

The next form, which Snorri calls "ordinary/standard hrynhenda", is almost like a "combination" of the previous — alliteration always on the first metrical-position, and the assonances in the odd-lines juxtaposed:

Vafði lítt, es virðum mǿtti
vígrǿkjandi framm at sǿkja.

There is one more form which is a bit different though it seems to be counted among the previous group by Snorri, called draughent. The syllable-count changes to seven (and, whether relevant to us or not, the second-syllable seems to be counted as the extra-metrical):

Vápna hríð velta náði
vægðarlaus feigum hausi;
hilmir lét hǫggum mǿta
herða klett bana verðan.

As one can see, there is very often clashing stress in the middle of the line (Vápna hríð velta ... vægðarlaus feigum, etc.), and oddhending seems preferred (as well as keeping alliterative and rhyming syllables separated, which likely has to do with the syllabic-makeup of the line).

== See also ==
- Kennings
- List of kennings
- Skald
- Suttungr
