= Geirr Tveitt =

Norwegian composer and pianist

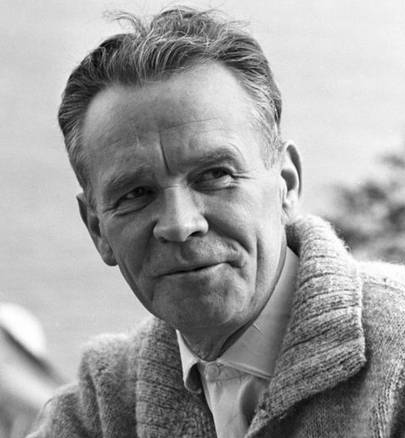
- Geirr Tveitt
- Born: Nils Tveit; 19 October 1908; Bergen, Norway
- Died: 1 February 1981 (aged 72); Oslo, Norway
- Occupations: Classical composer and pianist
- Children: 2

Geirr Tveitt (born Nils Tveit; 19 October 1908 – 1 February 1981) was a Norwegian composer and pianist. Tveitt was a central figure of the national movement in Norwegian cultural life during the 1930s.

== Life ==
=== Early years ===
Tveitt was born in Bergen, where his father briefly worked as a teacher. His parents were Håkonson Lars Tveit (1878–1951) and Johanna Nilsdotter Heradstveit (1882–1966). His family were of farmer stock, and still retained Tveit, their ancestral land in Kvam Municipality – a secluded area on the Hardangerfjord. The Tveit family would relocate to Drammen in the winter to work, but return to Hardanger in the summer to farm. Tveitt had originally been christened Nils, but following his increasing interest in Norwegian heritage, he thought the name was not Norwegian enough and changed it to Geir. He later added an extra r to his first name and an extra t to Tveit to indicate more clearly to non-Norwegians the desired pronunciation of his name. It was during his childhood summers in Hardanger that Tveitt gained knowledge of the rich folk-music traditions of the area. Historically, Hardanger's relative isolation allowed for the development of a unique musical culture, with which Tveitt became infatuated. Tveitt would then go on to learn to play both the violin and the piano. After being encouraged by Norwegian composer Christian Sinding, Tveitt decided to try his hand at writing music.

=== Leipzig ===
In 1928 Tveitt left Norway to study. He headed for Germany – to Leipzig and its Conservatory, which had been the hub of European musical learning and culture for a long time. There he studied composition with Hermann Grabner and Leopold Wenninger, and piano with Otto Weinreich. However, since he lacked funds, he had to rely on translation work and donations to support himself. In 1930 he'd get 12 Two-part Inventions in Lydian, Dorian and Phrygian accepted for publishing by Breitkopf & Hartel. The following year the Leipzig Radio Orchestra premiered Tveitt's first Piano Concerto.

=== European studies and touring ===
Tveitt had become increasingly frustrated with the teaching in Leipzig so in 1932 Tveitt headed on to Paris. Here he obtained lessons from some other important composers of the times: Arthur Honegger and Heitor Villa-Lobos. He further managed to enroll in the classes of Nadia Boulanger. Tveitt also made a visit to Vienna, where he was able to study for some time with Austrian composer Egon J. Wellesz, a former pupil of Arnold Schoenberg. Tveitt made one last educational stopover in Paris in 1938 before heading back home to Norway for work. Compared to other Norwegian composers contemporary with Tveitt, he had perhaps the most diverse education – and he had already started to make a name for himself. His writings and compositions made quite a stir amongst the establishment in Oslo. In the years leading up to World War II, Tveitt derived most of his income working as music critic to Sjofartstidende (The Naval Times). Tveitt's highly opinionated reviews contributed to him getting strong opponents – one of these was the Norwegian composer, Pauline Hall.

Once World War II ended, Tveitt brought his scores with him to Europe, travelling extensively – often performing his own piano works with similar works by other composers, e.g. Grieg and Chopin. Many of the concerts were great successes, especially the 1947 concert in Paris. There Tveitt premiered his Piano Sonatas nos 1 and 29, some of his adaptations of Hardanger Folk-Songs and also the Fourth Concerto for Piano and Orchestra – Aurora Borealis. The piano concerto was performed in a two-piano version, in which Tveitt was assisted by the French pianist Genevieve Joy. Tveitt's masterful playing, earned him the acclaim of his former teacher Nadia Boulanger in her following review.

=== Later years and death ===
In spite of Tveitt's glorious successes internationally, the contemporary Norwegian establishment never recognized him. Following the upheaval of World War II, anything that resembled nationalism or purism was quickly disdained by the establishment. Because of this Tveitt struggled financially and became increasingly isolated, spending more and more time at the family farm in Kvam and keeping his music to himself. His condition was worsened when his house burned to the ground in 1970. Tveitt despaired – the original manuscripts to almost 300 opuses (including six piano concertos and two concertos for Hardanger fiddle and orchestra) were destroyed in the fire. The Norwegian Music Information Centre agreed to archive the remains, but most of Tveitt's production was gone. Tveitt now found it very difficult to compose and gradually fell into alcoholism. Tveitt died in Norheimsund, Hardanger, largely embittered, with little hope for the legacy of his professional work.

=== Controversy ===
One of the most controversial areas of Tveitt's career is his affiliation with the Neo-Heathenistic movement, which centered around the Norwegian philosopher Hans S. Jacobsen (1901–1980) in the 1930s in Oslo. Jacobsen's main thesis, inspired by the theories of the German theologist Jakob Wilhelm Hauer, was the total refutation of Christianity in favour of a new heathen system based upon Norse mythology and the Edda poetry. The movement rejected Christianity and sought to re-introduce the Norse pre-Christian system of belief – the adoration of Odin, Thor and Balder. Jacobsen later became a member of Nasjonal Samling ('National Assembly'), which led the interim, pro-Hitler puppet government during the German occupation of Norway. Even though Geirr Tveitt displayed a deep interest in the theories of the movement, he never enrolled as a member of the Nasjonal Samling. His preoccupation with Jacobsen's thinking however, materialised in conspicuous ways; for example, Tveitt invented his own non-Christian timeline based upon the arrival of Leif Erikson in what is now Canada. Traces of Antisemitism are often found in his correspondence from the 1930s. The Neo-Heathen system of thought found its way into Tveitt's music; his perhaps most intensely such composition is the ballet Baldur's Dreams. In it Tveitt seeks to establish a link between this world – its creation, cycle and dwellers – and the eternal battle between the benevolent heathen Norse gods and their opponents, the evil jotuns. Tveitt began work on the ballet whilst studying in Leipzig, where it was first performed on 24 February 1938. There Baldur's Dreams became a remarkable success, and performances were later given in Berlin, Tübingen, Bergen and Oslo.

Another result of Tveitt's Norse purism was his development of the theory that the modal scales originally were Norwegian, renaming them in honor of Norse gods. He also developed an intricate diatonic theory, which interconnected the modal scales through a system of double leading notes. These ideas were published in his 1937 argument Tonalitätstheorie des parallellen Leittonsystems.

The issue of Tveitt's relationship with so-called 'nazi-ideologies' has been avoided by most scholars. Some commentators have noticed that one of the foremost Norwegian authorities on Tveitt, Hallgjerd Aksnes, Professor of Music at the University of Oslo, did not address this question in her article on Tveitt in Grove Dictionary of Music and Musicians. For Tveitt, the question proved devastating to his reputation, and contributed significantly to his becoming a persona-non-grata in the post-war musical establishment in Norway. Most of Tveitt's remaining music is now commercially available on records.

== Music ==
=== Stylistic origins ===
Geirr Tveitt's compositions are characterized by their eclectic influences, drawing inspiration from a diverse range of musical styles and traditions. His works prominently feature the aggressive energy found in the early ballets of Igor Stravinsky, as well as the distinctive rhythms and textures reminiscent of Béla Bartók. Tveitt's music often incorporates the ethereal and mystic qualities of Claude Debussy and Maurice Ravel, all the while rooted in motifs derived from Norwegian folk music. Unfortunately, a significant portion of Tveitt's oeuvre has not been published or systematically archived, a situation that was worsened by a fire in 1970. In an effort to salvage his works, Tveitt undertook visits to various universities across Norway and reached out to friends in search of any surviving copies or parts of his compositions, although these efforts yielded limited results. Over time, however, several of Tveitt's scores have been rediscovered; some have been reconstructed from orchestral parts, as well as from radio broadcasts and magnetic tape recordings.

=== Hardanger folk music ===
Tveitt's perhaps greatest musical project was the collection and adaptation of traditional folk melodies from the Hardanger district. Many composers and musicologists (including Norway's internationally recognised Edvard Grieg) had successfully researched and collected the music of Hardanger long before Tveitt. However, from 1940 onwards, when Tveitt settled permanently in Hardanger and spent much time working and playing with folk-musicians. He would then expand his library of melodies with these experiences, incorporating them in his work list; Fifty folktunes from Hardanger for piano op. 150, and A Hundred Hardanger Tunes op. 151. Musicologist David Gallagher suggests that in these two opuses are found the very best of Tveitt's qualities as a composer. The tunes reflect both profound Christian values and the mysticism of nature itself. Most of these tunes are directly concerned with Hardanger life, which Tveitt was a part of. Tveitt utilised his knowledge of traditional and avant-garde use of harmony and instruments when he scored the tunes. Copies of the piano versions and orchestral suites nos 1, 2, 4 and 5 were elsewhere during that tragic fire in 1970, so these works survive.

=== Legacy in Norway ===
Tveitt's works remained largely misunderstood by his contemporary Norwegian musical establishment. However, Tveit achieved popularity with his radio programmes on folk music at the Norwegian National Broadcasting (NRK) in the 1960s and '70s. Tveitt worked as Assistant Producer to the radio, where he also premiered numerous songs written to texts by respected and well-known Norwegian poets like Knut Hamsun, Arnulf Overland, Aslaug Vaa and Herman Wildenvey. Tveitt's most popular tune is Aslaug Låstad Lygre's poem We should not sleep in summer nights. In 1980 Tveitt was awarded the Lindeman prize for the work he had done through the NRK. He also set songs by Aslaug Vaa and Olav H. Hauge.

== Recordings and research ==
Today Norway is seeing the advent of a new generation of musicians and musicologists, who seem to be primarily concerned with Tveitt's music and not so much with the controversies he inspired. Starting in the late 1990s the Norwegian government began to provide some funding for the examination and preservation of the remains of Tveitt's scores, and several startling discoveries have been made. Thought to have been lost for all time, Baldur's Dreams appeared amongst the damaged manuscripts, and its fate is illustrative. Tveitt made numerous versions of the ballet – in Paris he presented a reworked score Dances from Baldur's Dreams. Tveitt then sent it to the choreographer Serge Lifar in London, where the score allegedly was lost in the Blitz.

However, after the signed manuscripts held at the NMIC were examined in 1999, it became apparent that Tveitt indeed had a copy of the 1938 original score – and through tedious restoration work by Norwegian composer Kaare Dyvik Husby and Russian composer Alexej Rybnikov from the signed manuscripts, recording, and a piano version, the ballet literally rose from the ashes. It is now available on BIS-CD-1337/1338, where Ole Kristian Ruud conducts the Stavanger Symphony Orchestra. A TV documentary program Baldur's Dreams on the incredible fate of the ballet, was broadcast in Norway on 15 June 2008 and attracted nationwide interest.

Another reconstruction project worth mentioning is the reconstruction of the solo piano piece Morild. The title references the phosphorescence of the sea, and it was lost in the 1970 fire. Fortunately, a recording of the work made by Tveitt for French national radio in 1952 has survived. It was issued for the first time on Simax in 1994. A reconstruction of the score was undertaken by the American transcription specialist Chris Eric Jensen in 2005 in collaboration with the pianist Håvard Gimse who gave the piece its first performance on Tveitt's 100th birthday on 19 October 2008, the first time it had been played by a pianist other than the composer.

== Selected works ==
Many of Tveitt's scores are published by the Norwegian Music Information Centre, as well as through the archives of the Society of Norwegian Composers.

=== Stage ===
- Baldur's Dreams, ballet
- Dragaredokko, opera
- Jeppe, opera

=== Concertante ===
- Piano
  - Piano Concerto No. 1 in F major, Op. 5 (1927)
  - Piano Concerto No. 2 in E-flat major 'Hommage to Ravel'
  - Piano Concerto No. 3 'Hommage to Brahms'
  - Piano Concerto No. 4 'Aurora Borealis' (Nordljus / Northern Lights) (piano part reconstructed from full orchestral parts, a two-piano reduction, and a recording)
  - Piano Concerto No. 5, Op. 156 (1954)
  - Variations on a Folk song from Hardanger, for two pianos and orchestra (1949)
- Hardanger fiddle
  - Hardanger Fiddle Concerto No. 1
  - Hardanger Fiddle Concerto No. 2 Three Fjords
- Harp
  - Harp Concerto No. 2

=== Orchestral ===
- A Hundred Hardanger Tunes, Op. 151 – Suite No. 1
- A Hundred Hardanger Tunes, Op. 151 – Suite No. 2
- A Hundred Hardanger Tunes, Op. 151 – Suite No. 4
- A Hundred Hardanger Tunes, Op. 151 – Suite No. 5
- Nykken (The Water Sprite), symphonic poem for large orchestra
- Prillar
- Sun God Symphony for orchestra (abridged version of Baldur's Dreams)
- Symphony No. 1 'Christmas' (1958)

=== Vocal/Choral ===
- Basun for tenor voice and orchestra (1971)
- Telemarkin – Cantata for voice and orchestra
- The Turtle for mezzo-soprano and orchestra. Text from Steinbeck's The Grapes of Wrath

=== Piano ===
- Fifty Hardanger Tunes, Op. 150
- Four-part Inventions in Lydian, Dorian, and Phrygian, Op. 4
- Piano Sonata No. 29, Op. 129, 'Sonata Etere'
- Three-part Inventions in Lydian, Dorian, and Phrygian, Op. 3
- 12 Two-part Inventions in Lydian, Dorian, and Phrygian, Op. 2 (1930)

=== Wind Band ===
- Sinfonia di Soffiatori (1974)
- Sinfonietta di Soffiatori (1962)

== Primary sources ==
- Aksnes, Hallgjerd, Perspectives of Musical Meaning: A Study Based on Selected Works by Geirr Tveitt, (doctoral dissertation, University of Oslo, 2002)
- Emberland, Terje, Religion og rase. Nyhedenskap og nazisme i Norge 1933–1945 (Oslo: Humanist Forlag, 2003).
- Storaas, Reidar, Tonediktaren Geirr Tveitt: Songjen i Fossaduren (Det Norske Samlaget, Oslo, 1990)
- Storaas, Reidar, Geir Tveitt: Mellom triumf og tragedie (2008)
- Tveit, Tore, Geirr Tveitt: Nordmann og Europeer: Hans Forhold til Den Nasjonale Retning i 1930–årene (doctoral dissertation, University of Oslo, 1983)

== Other sources ==
- Gallagher, David, 'A Hundred Hardanger Tunes, Op. 151: Suites Nos. 2 and 5,' sleeve notes for compact disc NAXOS 8.555770, 2002, 3 – 4.
- Gallagher David, 'Piano Concerto No. 4 "Aurora Borealis",' sleeve notes for compact disc NAXOS 8.555761, 2002, 2 – 4.
- Storaas, Reidar, 'Geirr Tveitt and Baldur,' sleeve notes for compact disc BIS CD-1337/1338 DIGITAL, 2003, 3 – 6.
