= Piano Sonata No. 29 (Tveitt) =

The Piano Sonata No. 29 ''Sonata Etere'', Op. 129 by Geirr Tveitt is Tveitt's only surviving piano sonata. The piece, though met with disdain by critics upon its publication in the early 1950s, has attained a prominent place among Norwegian piano sonatas.

Sonata Etere is characterized by bimodal/bitonal effects, fixed, continually varied rhythmic patterns, and shifts of accent. The work takes approximately 30 minutes to perform.

== Movements ==
This work has three movements:

1. In Cerca Di – Moderato
2. Tono Etereo in Variazoni – Tranquilo ma deciso
3. Tempo di Pulsazione

The sonata makes do with only two main themes, designated In Cerca Di (In search of, henceforth referred to as the first theme) and Tono Etereo (ethereal tune, henceforth referred to as the second theme) Both the themes of the work are introduced in the first movement.

=== I. In Cerca Di ===
Measures 1-21 introduce the first theme. Subsequently, the second theme initiates a developmental exposition in which the two themes are frequently juxtaposed. The impression one gets from the collective development of the themes is one of simultaneous unity and duality: the two themes act as one, but are in opposition to each other.

The developmental nature of this exposition is similar to traditional sonata procedure. There is a marked difference, however, in that the themes themselves retain their original form, rather than being chopped up into pieces as they would be in, say, a sonata by Beethoven. As developmental tools go, more emphasis is placed on alternating rhythmic patterns and shifts of key and accent.

In measure 212 we reach a recapitulation. This section of the piece is an altered repeat of the beginning of the exposition. It retains many of the basic elements of the exposition but many facets, such as key, are changed. The recapitulation is broken off in measure 263, and leads to a coda: the first theme builds to a sonorous climax, and strains of the second theme close the movement.

=== II. Tono Etereo in Variazoni ===
This movement consists of 19 distinctive sections:

1. Tranquilo ma decico
2. -
3. -
4. Viace e con allegra
5. Moderato
6. Andante
7. Piu lento
8. -
9. Molto vivace
10. Allegro molto
11. Allegretto
12. Piu moderato
13. Andante tranquilo
14. Cosa piu mosso e ben marcato
15. - (the first theme is brought back here)
16. Andante (reprise of #1)
17. Poco moderato (juxtaposition of the first and second theme)
18. Flebile
19. Tempo I.

Most of the sections are variations on the second theme, but the movement breaks with traditional variations procedure by section 15 - from that point on the first theme is brought back in and the two themes undergo a common development which might remind one of the first movement.

=== III. Tempo di Pulsazione ===
This movement is a wild, ominous dance based on the first theme. The second theme does not feature here. This movement has a form identical to that of the first movement.

== Sources ==
This article contains material from Young Composers released under the GNU Free Documentation License
