= Codex Regius =

Icelandic manuscript of Old Norse poems

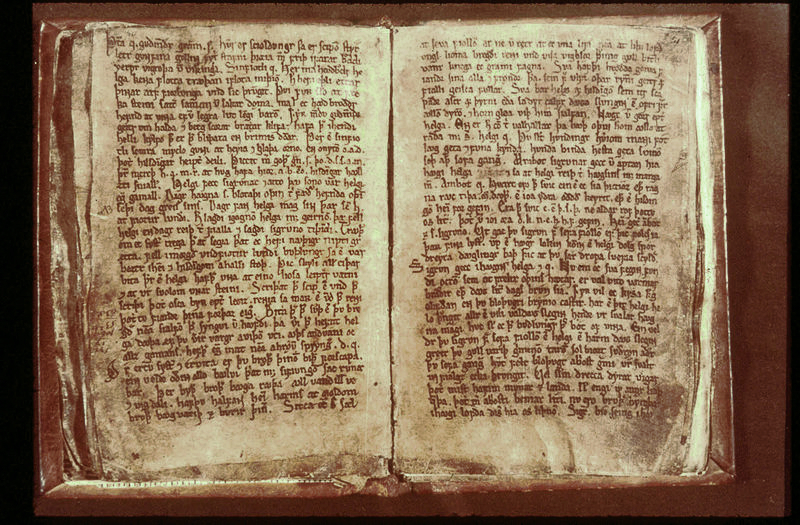
Two pages of the Codex Regius

Codex Regius (Latin: Cōdex Rēgius, "Royal Book" or "King's Book"; Icelandic: Konungsbók) or GKS 2365 4º is an Icelandic codex in which many Old Norse poems from the Poetic Edda are preserved. Thought to have been written during the 1270s, it is made up of 45 vellum leaves. The work originally contained a further eight leaves, which are now missing. It is the sole source for most of the poems it contains. In scholarly texts, this manuscript is commonly abbreviated as [R] for Codex Regius, or as [K] for Konungsbók.

The codex was discovered in 1643, when it came into the possession of Brynjólfur Sveinsson, then Bishop of Skálholt in Iceland, who in 1662 sent it as a gift to King Frederick III of Denmark; hence the name. It was then kept in the Royal Library in Copenhagen until April 21, 1971, when it was brought back to Reykjavík, and is now kept in the Árni Magnússon Institute for Icelandic Studies. Because air travel at the time was not entirely trustworthy with such precious cargo, it was transported by ship, accompanied by a military escort.

== Contents ==
| Völuspá | (The Prophecy of the Völva) |
| Hávamál | (The Speech of the High One) |
| Vafþrúðnismál | (The Speech of Vafþrúðnir) |
| Grímnismál | (The Speech of Grímnir) |
| Skírnismál | (The Speech of Skírnir) |
| Hárbarðsljóð | (The Song of Hárbarðr) |
| Hymiskviða | (The Poem of Hymir) |
| Lokasenna | (The Insults of Loki) |
| Þrymskviða | (The Poem of Þrymr) |
| Völundarkviða | (The Poem of Völundr) |
| Alvíssmál | (The Speech of Alvíss) |
| Helgakviða Hundingsbana I | (First Poem of Helgi Hundingsbane) |
| Helgakviða Hjörvarðssonar | ( Poem of Helgi Hjörvarðsson) |
| Helgakviða Hundingsbana II | (Second Poem of Helgi Hundingsbane) |
| Frá dauða Sinfjötla | (On the Death of Sinfjötli) |
| Grípisspá | (The Prophecy of Grípir) |
| Reginsmál | (The Speech of Reginn) |
| Fáfnismál | (The Speech of Fáfnir) |
| Sigrdrífumál | (The Speech of Sigrdrífa) |
| The Great Lacuna | A lacuna, not a portion of the text |
| Brot af Sigurðarkviðu | (The Broken-off Poem of Sigurðr) |
| Guðrúnarkviða I | (First Poem of Guðrún) |
| Sigurðarkviða hin skamma | (The Short Poem of Sigurðr) |
| Helreið Brynhildar | (Brynhild's Hel-Ride) |
| Dráp Niflunga | (Niflungs’ Killing) |
| Guðrúnarkviða II | (The Second Lay of Guðrún) |
| Guðrúnarkviða III | (The Third Lay of Guðrún) |
| Oddrúnargrátr | (Oddrún's Lament) |
| Atlakviða | (The Poem of Atli) |
| Atlamál | (The Greenlandic Speech of Atli) |
| Guðrúnarhvöt | (Guðrún's Cause) |
| Hamðismál | (The Speech of Hamðir) |

== Other manuscripts ==
One of the principal manuscripts of the Prose Edda (GKS 2367 4to) is also named Codex Regius. Composed of 55 vellum pages, dating from the early 14th century, it was part of the same gift from Bishop Brynjólfur to Frederick III. It was returned to Iceland in 1985, where it is now also in the Árni Magnússon Institute for Icelandic Studies.
