= Sigurðarkviða =

Sigurðarkviða ("lay of Sigurd") may refer to:

- Sigurðarkviða hin skamma
- Brot af Sigurðarkviðu
- Grípisspá (a.k.a. Sigurðarkviða Fáfnisbana I)
- Reginsmál (a.k.a. Sigurðarkviða Fáfnisbana II)

== See also ==
- Völsunga saga
