= Hindarfjall =

Place in Norse mythology

Hindarfjall or Hindafjall ("Hind mountain") is the mountain where Brynhildr lives in the Völsung cycle.

In Snorri Sturluson's account of the Völsung cycle (Skáldskaparmál), Sigurðr first meets Brynhildr, whom he finds asleep, in a building on a mountain whose name is not given. Later, Brynhildr is said to live on Hindafjall, in a hall surrounded by wavering flames (vafrlogi). Sigurðr rides through them and asks for Brynhildr's hand, having taken the appearance of Gunnarr.

In the other sources (Sigrdrífumál, Völsunga saga), Hindarfjall is mentioned in relation with the first encounter: after killing Fáfnir and Reginn, Sigurðr rides up onto Hindarfjall and goes south toward Frakkland. Then he sees a great light on a mountain. There stands a wall of shield, and behind it Sigrdrífa-Brynhildr asleep. The name of the place where the second meeting takes place, when Sigurðr rides through the flames after he and Gunnar exchanged forms, is not given.

Hindarfjall is also mentioned in Fáfnismál, where the birds, which Sigurðr can understand after tasting Fáfnir's blood, talk about a hall on Hindarfjall, surrounded with flames, where Sigrdrífa sleeps.

In Helreið Brynhildar, it is called Skatalundr, and there is an obscure stanza that Sigurðr first meet Brynhildr in her foster-father's home.
