= Sigurðarkviða hin skamma =

Old Norse poem

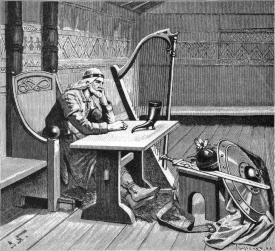
Gunnarr has to decide whether to kill Sigurd or lose his wife Brynhildr. Since both have great riches, killing Sigurd should be a win-win situation. Illustration by Jenny Nyström (1893).

Sigurðarkviða hin skamma or the Short Lay of Sigurd is an Old Norse poem belonging to the heroic poetry of the Poetic Edda. It is one of the longest eddic poems and its name derives from the fact that there was once a longer Sigurðarkviða, but this poem only survives as the fragment Brot af Sigurðarkviðu (see the Great Lacuna).

According to Henry Adams Bellows, the poem was mainly composed for "vivid and powerful characterization" and not for the telling of a story with which most of the listeners of his time were already quite familiar. Bellows notes that the story telling is closer to the German tradition (found in the Nibelungenlied) than it is to the Scandinavian tradition, and that this is because the matter of Sigurd existed in many and varied forms in Northern Europe c. 1100 when the poem was probably composed.

== Synopsis ==
The poem begins with the victorious young Sigurd the Völsung's arrival at the court of Gjúki and it informs that he swore oaths together with the two brothers (Gjúki's sons Gunnarr and Högni). The two brothers gave him many jewels and their sister Guðrún for wife, and they spent time together drinking and talking. Then the two brothers departed to woo Brynhildr and Sigurd joined them. The poet then jumps to the moment when Sigurd shared bed with Brynhildr by putting his sword between them. He never held her in his arms and gave her to Gjúki's son (Gunnar).

Then the poem dwells on Brynhildr and informs that she had never known either ill or sorrow. She was without blame and could not dream that she would have it, but fate would have it differently. Brynhildr decided that it was she who should have Sigurd and not Guðrún:

6. Ein sat hon úti
aftan dags,
nam hon svá margt
um at mælask:
"Hafa skal ek Sigurð,
- eða þó svelta, -
mög frumungan
mér á armi.

7. Orð mæltak nú,
iðrumk eftir þess:
kván er hans Guðrún,
en ek Gunnars;
ljótar nornir
skópu oss langa þrá."

6. By herself at the end
of day she sat,
And in open words
her heart she uttered:
"I shall Sigurth have,
the hero young,
E'en though within
my arms he die.

7. "The word I have spoken;
soon shall I rue it,
His wife is Guthrun,
and Gunnar's am I;
Ill Norns set for me
long desire."

She went to Gunnarr and told him that she would divorce him and that he would lose both her and her lands, unless he killed Sigurd and his son Sigmund. Gunnarr was grieving, because he loved both Sigurd and Brynhildr, and after many hours of reflection, he summoned his brother Högni, and asked him if he would betray their blood-brother Sigurd for his wealth:

16. Vildu okkr fylki
til fjár véla?
Gótt er at ráða
Rínar malmi
ok unandi
auði stýra
ok sitjandi
sælu njóta."

16. "Wilt thou the hero
for wealth betray?.
'Twere good to have
the gold of the Rhine,
And all the hoard
in peace to hold,
And waiting fortune
thus to win."

Högni responded that they were bound by oaths to Sigurd, and it would be to compromise the future of themselves and their descendants. Gunnarr then suggested that they incite their brother Guthormr who had not sworn any oaths to Sigurd. The poet then jumps to the moment when Gutthorm's sword was in Sigurd's heart. Sigurd, however, took his murderer with him:

22. Réð til hefnda
hergjarn í sal
ok eftir varp
óbilgjörnum;
fló til Guthorms
Grams ramliga
kynbirt járn
ór konungs hendi.

23. Hné hans of dolgr
til hluta tveggja,
hendr ok höfuð
hné á annan veg,
en fóta hlutr
féll aftr í stað.

22. In vengeance the hero
rose in the hall,
And hurled his sword
at the slayer bold;
At Gotthorm flew
the glittering steel
Of Gram full hard
from the hand of the king.

23. The foeman cleft
asunder fell,
Forward hands
and head did sink,
And legs and feet
did backward fall.

Guðrún who was lying beside Sigurd woke up and discovered that she was lying in his blood:

24. Sofnuð var Guðrún
í sæingu
sorgalaus
hjá Sigurði,
en hon vaknaði
vilja firrð,
er hon Freys vinar
flaut í dreyra.

24. Guthrun soft
in her bed had slept,
Safe from care
at Sigurth's side;
She woke to find
her joy had fled,
In the blood of the friend
of Freyr she lay.

She clasped her hands together so hard that Sigurd rose up and asked her not to weep, because her brothers were alive, but their son (Sigmund) was still too young to flee for his life. He said that it was Brynhildr who was to be blamed. Brynhildr had loved him above all other men, but he had been faithful to Gunnarr and kept his oaths. Then Sigurd died and Guðrún swooned. She had clasped her hands together so hard that the cups in the cupboard rang and the geese in the courtyard cried. Brynhildr who heard Guðrún's cries laughed with all her heart:

30. Hló þá Brynhildr
Buðla dóttir
einu sinni
af öllum hug,
er hon til hvílu
heyra knátti
gjallan grát
Gjúka dóttur.

30. Then Brynhild, daughter
of Buthli, laughed,
Only once,
with all her heart,
When as she lay
full loud she heard
The grievous wail
of Gjuki's daughter.

Gunnarr told Brynhildr that she never laughed for good things and asked her why she was so pale. He told her that she would have been a worthier woman if she had seen her brother Atli killed. Brynhildr responded that her brother Atli was mightier and would outlive him. She had not desired to have a husband, before the three kings, Sigurd and the Gjukungs (Gunnar and Högni) had arrived. It had been to the gold-adorned hero Sigurd who was sitting on Grani that she had given her vows. Although both Gunnarr and Sigurd were kingly, Gunnarr was not the like of Sigurd. Moreover, Atli had threatened her that she would lose her wealth, if she did not consent to marry. Brynhildr had pondered whether to fight and defy her brother, but the riches of Sigurd had prevailed on her. She would only love one man in her life.

Brynhildr then declared that she had decided to kill herself. Gunnarr tried to embrace her, but she pushed him away, and she pushed away everyone who tried to show her affection. In desperation, Gunnarr asked Högni what to do. Gunnar said that they should ask their warriors to watch over Brynhildr and restrain her from killing herself until she forgot about it. Högni only spoke a few words and he said that no one should restrain her because Brynhildr had been born for evil deeds and that she should not be born again.

Gunnarr turned away from Brynhildr who was dividing her gems while watching the killed slaves and bondwomen. Then she put on her golden byrnie and pierced her own heart with a sword. She put her head on her pillow and said that those of her women who wanted her gold must be prepared to follow her in death. The others answered that enough people had died and her women should not win honour that way. Brynhildr responded that no one should die for her sake unwillingly, but if they would not join her, they would have little gold to wear.

Þó mun á beinum
brenna yðrum
færi eyrir,
þá er ér fram komið,
neitt Menju góð,
mín at vitja.

51. "But little of gems
to gleam on your limbs
Ye then shall find
when forth ye fare
To follow me,
or of Menja's wealth.

Brynhildr then told Gunnarr that his troubles were not ended, and she began to tell a prophecy about Guðrún. She would be given to Atli in an unhappy marriage, and she would bring woe to many warriors. She would also have a daughter named Svanhildr:

Þar er mær borin,
- móðir fæðir, -
sú mun hvítari
en inn heiði dagr
Svanhildr vera,
sólar geisla.

54. "A maid shall then
the mother bear;
Brighter far
than the fairest day
Svanhild shall be,
or the beams of the sun.

Brynhildr said that she remembered how they deceived her, and continued by telling that Gunnarr would desire Oddrún for wife and they would love each other secretly because Atli would not allow them to marry. Then Gunnarr would suffer like she had suffered. Later, Atli would throw Gunnarr into a den of snakes, but Atli would lose both fortune and his two sons, and he would die pierced in bed with a sword by Guðrún.

Brynhildr said that Guðrún would then do best to follow her husband by killing herself, if she followed good advice or had a similar heart to Brynhild's. Instead, Guðrún would go across the waves to the kingdom of Jónakr, with whom she would have sons. However, her and Sigurd's daughter Svanhildr would go far away, and due to Bikki's words, Jörmunrekkr would slay Svanhhildr in wrath. This would be the end of Sigurd's line and this would increase the sorrow of Guðrún.

Brynhild's last wish was that Sigurd's pyre be built wide enough for both her and Sigurd. The pyre would be covered with shields, carpets and killed slaves. She requested that the slaves should burn fully decked beside Sigurd. Two were to be at his feet and two at his head. There were also to be a brace of dogs and a pair of hawks. Between Sigurd and Brynhildr they were to put the sword that lay between them when formerly they were sleeping together and they were called wedded mates.

With her last words, Brynhildr added that when Sigurd entered the afterlife, the door should not shut behind him but remain open until his retinue had entered the hall.

Því at hánum fylgja
fimm ambáttir,
átta þjónar,
eðlum góðir,
fóstrman mitt
ok faðerni,
þat er Buðli gaf
barni sínu.

Margt sagða ek,
munda ek fleira,
er mér meir mjötuðr
málrúm gæfi;
ómum þverr,
undir svella,
satt eitt sagðak,
svá mun ek láta."

69. "Bond-women five
shall follow him,
And eight of my thralls,
well-born are they,
Children with me,
and mine they were
As gifts that Buthli
his daughter gave.

70. "Much have I told thee,
and more would say
If fate more space
for speech had given;
My voice grows weak,
my wounds are swelling;
Truth I have said,
and so I die."
