= Dráp Niflunga =

Short prose section in the Poetic Edda

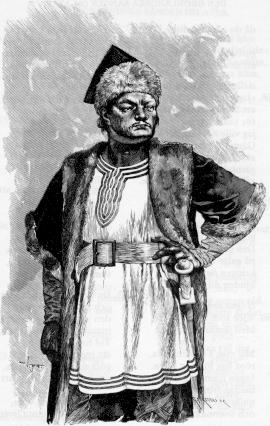
Attila the Hun (Atli) gets his revenge by killing the lords of the Burgundians in this section of the Poetic Edda.

The Dráp Niflunga is a short prose section in the Poetic Edda between Helreið Brynhildar and Guðrúnarkviða II. Henry Adams Bellows notes in his commentary that the purpose of the section is to serve as a narrative link between the poems.

In the preceding sections, both Sigurd and Brynhildr have died and this section deals with how Brynhild's brother Atli becomes Gudrun's second husband and with how Atli avenges Brynhild's death by slaying Gudrun's brothers Gunnar and Hogni.

== Storyline ==
This is Henry Adams Bellows' translation of the section:

Gunnar and Hogni then took all the gold that Fafnir had had. There was strife between the Gjukungs and Atli, for he held the Gjukungs guilty of Brynhild's death. It was agreed that they should give him Guthrun as wife, and they gave her a draught of forgetfulness to drink before she would consent to be wedded to Atli. The sons of Atli were Erp and Eitil, and Svanhild was the daughter of Sigurth and Guthrun. King Atli invited Gunnar and Hogni to come to him, and sent as messenger Vingi or Knefröth. Guthrun was aware of treachery, and sent with him a message in runes that they should not come, and as a token she sent to Hogni the ring Andvaranaut and tied a wolf's hair in it. Gunnar had sought Oddrun, Atli's sister, for his wife, but had her not; then he married Glaumvor, and Hogni's wife was Kostbera; their sons were Solar and Snævar and Gjuki. And when the Gjukungs came to Atli, then Guthrun be sought her sons to plead for the lives of both the Gjukungs, but they would not do it. Hogni's heart was cut out, and Gunnar was cast into the serpent's den. He smote on the harp and put the serpents to sleep, but an adder stung him in the liver.
