= Guðrúnarkviða I =

Heroic poem of the Poetic Edda

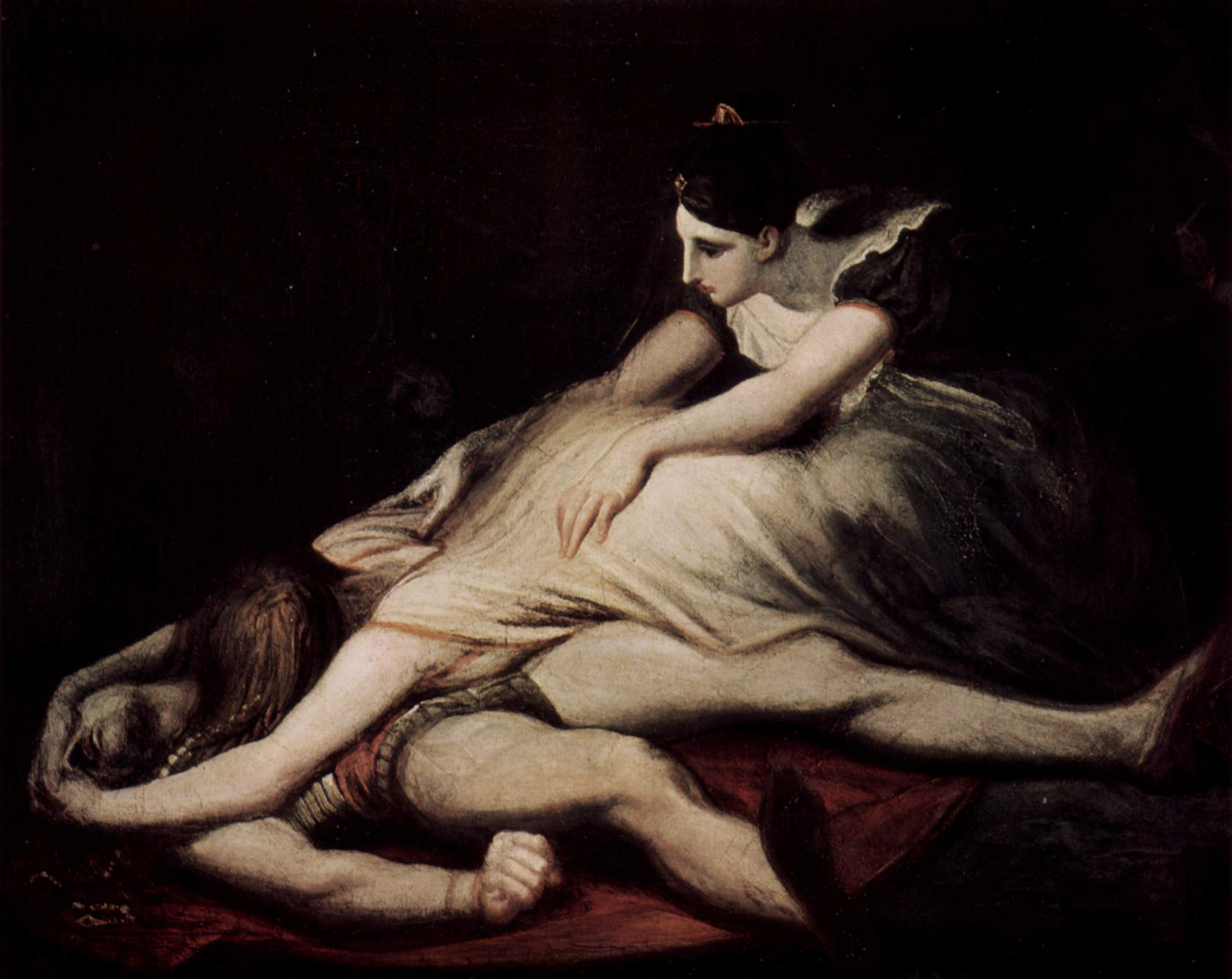
Illustration by Johann Heinrich Füssli.

Guðrúnarkviða I or the First Lay of Guðrún is simply called Guðrúnarkviða in Codex Regius, where it is found together with the other heroic poems of the Poetic Edda. Henry Adams Bellows considered it to be one of the finest of the eddic poems with an "extraordinary emotional intensity and dramatic force". It is only in this poem that Gjúki's sister Gjaflaug and daughter Gollrönd are mentioned, and the only source where Herborg, the queen of the Huns, appears. The Guðrún lays show that the hard-boiled heroic poetry of the Poetic Edda also had a place for the hardships of women.

Bellows considers it to be one of the oldest heroic lays and with very few Scandinavian additions. Brynhild's only role is the cause of Sigurd's death and Guðrún's enemy.

Alfred Tennyson's poem Home They Brought Her Warrior Dead was inspired by Benjamin Thorpe's translation of the lay.

== Synopsis ==
Guðrún sat beside her dead husband, Sigurð, but she did not weep with tears like other women, although her heart was bursting with grief.

1. Ár var, þats Guðrún
gerðisk at deyja,
er hon sat sorgfull
yfir Sigurði;
gerði-t hon hjúfra
né höndum slá,
né kveina um
sem konur aðrar.

1. Then did Guthrun
think to die,
When she by Sigurth
sorrowing sat;
Tears she had not,
nor wrung her hands,
Nor ever wailed,
as other women.

A prose section informs that Guðrún had had a taste of Fafnir's heart from Sigurð and could understand the song of birds. Bellows notes that this information serves no purpose in the poem, but that the Völsunga saga also mentions that she had eaten some of Fafnir's heart, after which she was both wiser and grimmer.

In order to show sympathy and to console her, both jarls and their spouses came to Guðrún to tell her that they too carried great sorrow in their lives.

2. Gengu jarlar
alsnotrir fram,
þeir er harðs hugar
hana löttu;
þeygi Guðrún
gráta mátti,
svá var hon móðug,
mundi hon springa.

3. Sátu ítrar
jarla brúðir,
gulli búnar,
fyr Guðrúnu;
hvar sagði þeira
sinn oftrega,
þann er bitrastan
of beðit hafði.

2. To her the warriors
wise there came,
Longing her heavy
woe to lighten;
Grieving could not
Guthrun weep,
So sad her heart,
it seemed, would break.

3. Then the wives
of the warriors came,
Gold-adorned,
and Guthrun sought;
Each one then
of her own grief spoke,
The bitterest pain
she had ever borne.

Her aunt Gjaflaug (Gjúki's sister) told her that she had lost five husbands, two daughters, three sisters and eight brothers, but still carried on living.

Herborg, the queen of the Huns, told her that she had lost her husband and seven of her sons in the south. She had also lost her father, mother and four brothers at sea. She had buried all of them with her own hands, and there was no one to console her. Within the same six months, the queen had even been taken as war booty and had had to bind the shoes of a queen who beat her and abused her. The king was the best lord she had ever known and his queen the worst woman.

Herborg's foster-daughter, and Guðrún's sister, Gollrönd had Sigurð's corpse unveiled and she put Sigurð's head on Guðrún's knees. Gullrönd asked Guðrún to kiss Sigurd as if he were still alive. Guðrún bent over Sigurð's head with his clotted hair and her tears began to run like raindrops.

Gullrönd said that Guðrún's and Sigurð's love was the greatest one she had ever seen. Her sister then answered that Sigurð was a greater man than their brothers and that Sigurð had found her a higher lady than the Valkyries:

18. "Svá var minn Sigurðr
hjá sonum Gjúka
sem væri geirlaukr
ór grasi vaxinn
eða væri bjartr steinn
á band dreginn,
jarknasteinn
yfir öðlingum.

19. Ek þótta ok
þjóðans rekkum
hverri hæri
Herjans dísi;
nú em ek svá lítil
sem lauf séi
oft í jölstrum
at jöfur dauðan.

17. "So was my Sigurth
o'er Gjuki's sons
As the spear-leek grown
above the grass,
Or the jewel bright
borne on the band,
The precious stone
that princes wear.

18. "To the leader of men
I loftier seemed
And higher than all
of Herjan's maids;
As little now
as the leaf I am
On the willow hanging;
my hero is dead.

She then turned towards her brothers talking of their crime, and she cursed her brothers that their greed for Fafnir's gold would be their undoing. She then directed her words against Brynhildr and said that their home was happier before she appeared.

Brynhildr, who was present, responded that Guðrún's sister Gollrönd was a witch who had made Guðrún's tears flow and used magic to make her speak. Gullrönd retorted that Brynhildr was a hated woman who had brought sorrow to seven kings and made many women lose their love. Brynhildr then answered by putting the blame on her brother Atli (Attila the Hun), because he had forced her to marry Gunnar against her will. The last stanza dwells on Brynhild's anger:

Stóð hon und stoð,
strengði hon efli;
brann Brynhildi
Buðla dóttur
eldr ór augum,
eitri fnæsti,
er hon sár of leit
á Sigurði.

25. By the pillars she stood,
and gathered her strength,
From the eyes of Brynhild,
Buthli's daughter,
Fire there burned,
and venom she breathed,
When the wounds she saw
on Sigurth then.

The lay ends with a prose section which tells that Guðrún went into the wilderness and traveled to Denmark where she stayed for three years and a half with Thora, the daughter of Hakon. Referring to Sigurðarkviða hin skamma, the prose section ends by telling that Brynhildr would soon take her own life with a sword after having killed eight of her thralls and five of her maids in order to take them with her.
