= Oddrúnargrátr =

Eddic poem

Gunnarr, the object of Oddrún's forbidden love.

Oddrúnargrátr (Oddrún's lament) or Oddrúnarkviða (Oddrún's poem) is an Eddic poem, found in the Codex Regius manuscript where it follows Guðrúnarkviða III and precedes Atlakviða.

The main content of the poem is the lament of Oddrún, sister of Atli, for Gunnarr, her lost and forbidden love. The poem is well preserved and thought to be a relatively late composition, perhaps from the 11th century. The metre is fornyrðislag.
