= Poetic Edda =

Collection of Old Norse poems

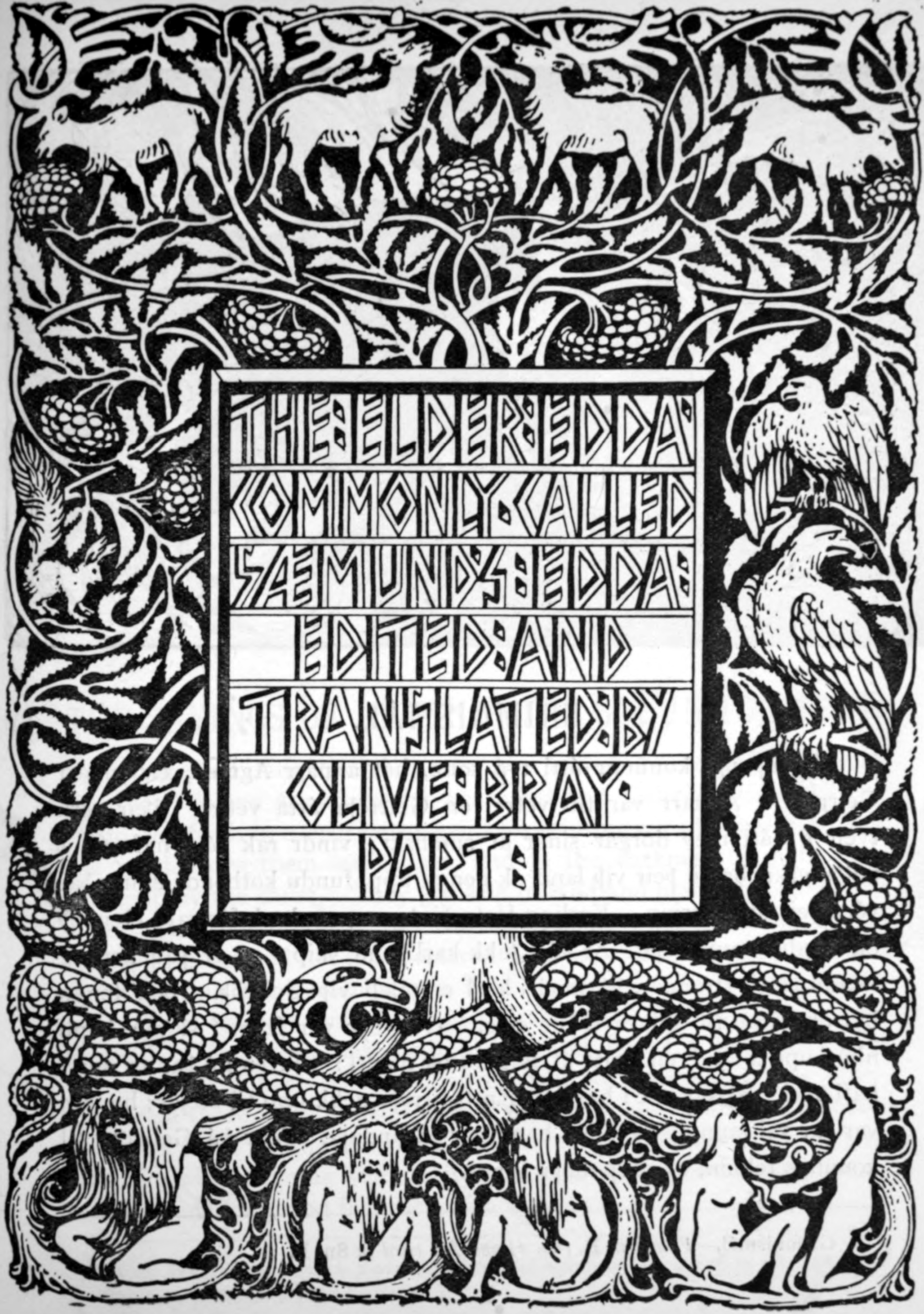
The title page of Olive Bray's English translation of Codex Regius entitled Poetic Edda depicting the tree Yggdrasil and a number of its inhabitants (1908) by W. G. Collingwood

The Poetic Edda is the modern name for a collection of Old Norse anonymous narrative poems written in alliterative verse (known as Eddic poems). It is distinct from the closely related Prose Edda, although both works are seminal to the study of Old Norse poetry.

Because the Poetic Edda is a compiled body of literature and editors have differed in their selection of included poems, published versions can vary. However, forming the basis for all versions are poems found in the medieval Icelandic manuscript Codex Regius. The Codex Regius—and, by extension, the Poetic Edda—are also known as the Elder Edda or Sæmundar Edda.

== Composition ==
The Eddic poems are composed in alliterative verse. Most are in fornyrðislag ("old story metre"), while málaháttr ("speech form") is a common variation. The rest, about a quarter, are composed in ljóðaháttr ("song form"). The language of the poems is usually clear and relatively unadorned. Kennings are often employed, though they do not arise as frequently, nor are they as complex, as those found in typical skaldic poetry.

=== Authorship ===
Like most early poetry, the Eddic poems were minstrel poems, passed orally from singer to singer and from poet to poet for centuries. None of the poems are attributed to a particular author, though many of them show strong individual characteristics and are likely to have been the work of individual poets. While scholars have speculated on hypothetical authors, firm and accepted conclusions have never been reached.

=== Date ===
Accurate dating of the poems has long been a source of scholarly debate. Firm conclusions are difficult to reach; lines from the Eddic poems sometimes appear in poems by known poets. For example, Eyvindr skáldaspillir composed in the latter half of the 10th century, and he uses a couple of lines in his Hákonarmál that are also found in Hávamál. It is possible that he was quoting a known poem, but it is also possible that Hávamál, or at least the strophe in question, is the younger derivative work.

The handful of demonstrably historical characters mentioned in the poems, such as Attila, provide a terminus post quem of sorts. The dating of the manuscripts themselves provides a number of useful terminus ante quem.

Individual poems have individual clues to their age. For example, Atlamál hin groenlenzku is claimed by its title to have been composed in Greenland and seems so by some internal evidence. If so, it must have been composed no earlier than about 985, since there were no Scandinavians in Greenland until that time.

More certain than such circumstantial evidence are linguistic dating criteria. These can be arrived at by looking at Skaldic poems whose dates are more firmly known. For instance the particle of, corresponding to ga- or ge- in other old Germanic languages, has been shown to occur more frequently in Skaldic poems of earlier date. Applying this criterion to Eddic poetry, Bjarne Fidjestøl found large variation, indicating that some of the poems were much older than others.

Other dating criteria include the use of the negative adverb eigi 'not', and alliteration of vr- with v-. In western dialects of Old Norse the former became r- around the year 1000, but in some Eddic poems the word vreiðr, younger form reiðr, is seen to alliterate with words beginning in an original v-. This was observed already by Olaf 'White Skald' Thordarson, the author of the Third Grammatical Treatise, who termed this v before r the vindandin forna; 'the ancient use of vend'.

In some cases, old poems may have been interpolated with younger verses or merged with other poems. For example, stanzas 9–16 of Völuspá, the "Dvergatal" or "Roster of Dwarfs", is considered by some scholars to be an interpolation.

=== Location ===
The problem of dating the poems is linked with the problem of determining where they were composed. Iceland was not settled until approximately 870, so anything composed before that time would necessarily have been elsewhere, most likely in Scandinavia. More recent poems, on the other hand, are likely Icelandic in origin.

Scholars have attempted to localize individual poems by studying the geography, flora, and fauna to which they refer. This approach usually does not yield firm results. For example, there are no wolves in Iceland, but we can be sure that Icelandic poets were familiar with the species. Similarly, the apocalyptic descriptions of Völuspá have been taken as evidence that the poet who composed it had seen a volcanic eruption in Iceland – but this is hardly certain.

== Sources ==
=== Codex Regius ===
The Codex Regius, containing 31 poems, is arguably the most important extant source on Norse mythology and Germanic heroic legends. Since the early 19th century, it has had a powerful influence on Scandinavian literature, not only through its stories, but also through the visionary force and the dramatic quality of many of the poems. It has also been an inspiration for later innovations in poetic meter, particularly in Nordic languages, with its use of terse, stress-based metrical schemes that lack final rhymes, instead focusing on alliterative devices and strongly concentrated imagery. Poets who have acknowledged their debt to the Codex Regius include Vilhelm Ekelund, August Strindberg, J. R. R. Tolkien, Ezra Pound, Jorge Luis Borges, and Karin Boye.

The Codex Regius was written during the 13th century, but nothing was known of its whereabouts until 1643, when it came into the possession of Brynjólfur Sveinsson, then Bishop of Skálholt. At the time, versions of the related Prose Edda by Snorri Sturluson were known in Iceland, but scholars speculated that there once was another Edda, an Elder Edda, which contained the pagan poems that Snorri quotes in his writings. When Codex Regius was discovered, it seemed that the speculation had proved correct, although modern scholarly research has shown that the Prose Edda was likely written first and that the two were, at most, connected by a common source.

Bishop Brynjólfur attributed the manuscript to Sæmundr the Learned, a larger-than-life 12th century Icelandic priest. Modern scholars reject that attribution, but the name Sæmundar Edda is still sometimes associated with both the Codex Regius and versions of the Poetic Edda using it as a source.

Bishop Brynjólfur sent the manuscript as a present to the Danish king, hence the Latin name Codex Regius, lit. 'Royal Book'. For centuries it was stored in the Royal Library in Copenhagen, but in 1971 it was returned to Iceland. Because air travel at the time was not entirely trustworthy with such precious cargo, it was transported by ship, accompanied by a naval escort.

=== Other manuscripts ===
Poems similar to those found in the Codex Regius are also included in many versions of the Poetic Edda. Important manuscripts containing these other poems include AM 748 I 4to, Hauksbók, and Flateyjarbók. Many of the poems are also quoted in Snorri's Prose Edda, but usually only in bits and pieces. What poems are included in a particular version of the Poetic Edda depends on the editor. Those not found in the Codex Regius are sometimes called the "eddic appendix". Other Eddic-like poems not usually published in the Poetic Edda are sometimes called Eddica minora and were compiled by Andreas Heusler and Wilhelm Ranisch in their 1903 book titled Eddica minora: Dichtungen eddischer Art aus den Fornaldarsögur und anderen Prosawerken.

== Typical contents ==
The cover of Lee M. Hollander's Poetic Edda

English translators are not consistent on the translations of the names of the Eddic poems or on how the Old Norse forms should be rendered in English. Up to three translated titles are given below, taken from the translations of Bellows, Hollander, and Larrington with proper names in the normalized English forms found in John Lindow's Norse Mythology and in Andy Orchard's Cassell's Dictionary of Norse Myth and Legend.

=== Mythological poems ===
==== From the Codex Regius ====
- Völuspá (Wise-woman's prophecy, The Prophecy of the Seeress, The Seeress's Prophecy)
- Hávamál (The Ballad of the High One, The Sayings of Hár, Sayings of the High One)
- Vafþrúðnismál (The Ballad of Vafthrúdnir, The Lay of Vafthrúdnir, Vafthrúdnir's Sayings)
- Grímnismál (The Ballad of Grímnir, The Lay of Grímnir, Grímnir's Sayings)
- Skírnismál (The Ballad of Skírnir, The Lay of Skírnir, Skírnir's Journey)
- Hárbarðsljóð (The Poem of Hárbard, The Lay of Hárbard, Hárbard's Song)
- Hymiskviða (The Lay of Hymir, Hymir's Poem)
- Lokasenna (Loki's Wrangling, The Flyting of Loki, Loki's Quarrel)
- Þrymskviða (The Lay of Thrym, Thrym's Poem)
- Völundarkviða (The Lay of Völund)
- Alvíssmál (The Ballad of Alvís, The Lay of Alvís, All-Wise's Sayings)

==== Not from the Codex Regius ====
- Baldrs draumar (Baldr's Dreams)
- Gróttasöngr (The Mill's Song, The Song of Grotti)
- Rígsþula (The Song of Ríg, The Lay of Ríg, The List of Ríg)
- Hyndluljóð (The Poem of Hyndla, The Lay of Hyndla, The Song of Hyndla)
  - Völuspá hin skamma (The short Völuspá, The Short Seeress' Prophecy, Short Prophecy of the Seeress) - This poem, sometimes presented separately, is often included as an interpolation within Hyndluljóð.
- Svipdagsmál (The Ballad of Svipdag, The Lay of Svipdag) – This title, originally suggested by Bugge, actually covers two separate poems. These poems are late works and not included in most editions after 1950:
  - Grógaldr (Gróa's Spell, The Spell of Gróa)
  - Fjölsvinnsmál (Ballad of Fjölsvid, The Lay of Fjölsvid)
- Hrafnagaldr Óðins (Odins's Raven Song, Odin's Raven Chant). (A late work not included in most editions after 1900).
- Gullkársljóð (The Poem of Gullkár). (A late work not included in most editions after 1900).

=== Heroic lays ===
After the mythological poems, the Codex Regius continues with heroic lays about mortal heroes, examples of Germanic heroic legend. The heroic lays are to be seen as a whole in the Edda, but they consist of three layers: the story of Helgi Hundingsbani, the story of the Nibelungs, and the story of Jörmunrekkr, king of the Goths. These are, respectively, Scandinavian, German, and Gothic in origin. As far as historicity can be ascertained, Attila, Jörmunrekkr, and Brynhildr actually existed, taking Brynhildr to be partly based on Brunhilda of Austrasia, but the chronology has been reversed in the poems.

==== From the Codex Regius ====
The Helgi Lays

- Helgakviða Hundingsbana I or Völsungakviða (The First Lay of Helgi Hundingsbane, The First Lay of Helgi the Hunding-Slayer, The First Poem of Helgi Hundingsbani)
- Helgakviða Hjörvarðssonar (The Lay of Helgi the Son of Hjörvard, The Lay of Helgi Hjörvardsson, The Poem of Helgi Hjörvardsson)
- Helgakviða Hundingsbana II or Völsungakviða in forna (The Second Lay of Helgi Hundingsbane, The Second Lay of Helgi the Hunding-Slayer, A Second Poem of Helgi Hundingsbani)

The Niflung Cycle

- Frá dauða Sinfjötla (Of Sinfjötli's Death, Sinfjötli's Death, The Death of Sinfjötli) (A short prose text.)
- Grípisspá (Grípir's Prophecy, The Prophecy of Grípir)
- Reginsmál (The Ballad of Regin, The Lay of Regin)
- Fáfnismál (The Ballad of Fáfnir, The Lay of Fáfnir)
- Sigrdrífumál (The Ballad of The Victory-Bringer, The Lay of Sigrdrífa)
- Brot af Sigurðarkviðu (Fragment of a Sigurd Lay, Fragment of a Poem about Sigurd)
- Guðrúnarkviða I (The First Lay of Gudrún)
- Sigurðarkviða hin skamma (The Short Lay of Sigurd, A Short Poem about Sigurd)
- Helreið Brynhildar (Brynhild's Hell-Ride, Brynhild's Ride to Hel, Brynhild's Ride to Hell)
- Dráp Niflunga (The Slaying of The Niflungs, The Fall of the Niflungs, The Death of the Niflungs)
- Guðrúnarkviða II (The Second Lay of Gudrún or Guðrúnarkviða hin forna The Old Lay of Gudrún)
- Guðrúnarkviða III (The Third Lay of Gudrún)
- Oddrúnargrátr (The Lament of Oddrún, The Plaint of Oddrún, Oddrún's Lament)
- Atlakviða (The Lay of Atli). The full manuscript title is Atlakviða hin grœnlenzka, that is, The Greenland Lay of Atli, but editors and translators generally omit the Greenland reference as a probable error from confusion with the following poem.
- Atlamál hin groenlenzku (The Greenland Ballad of Atli, The Greenlandish Lay of Atli, The Greenlandic Poem of Atli)

The Jörmunrekkr Lays

- Guðrúnarhvöt (Gudrún's Inciting, Gudrún's Lament, The Whetting of Gudrún.)
- Hamðismál (The Ballad of Hamdir, The Lay of Hamdir)

==== Not from the Codex Regius ====
Several of the legendary sagas contain poetry in the Eddic style. Their age and importance is often difficult to evaluate but the Hervarar saga, in particular, contains interesting poetic interpolations.

- Hlöðskviða (Lay of Hlöd, also known in English as The Battle of the Goths and the Huns), extracted from Hervarar saga.
- The Waking of Angantýr, extracted from Hervarar saga.

== English translations ==
The Elder or Poetic Edda has been translated numerous times, the earliest printed edition being that by A. S. Cottle in 1797, though some short sections had been translated as early as the 1670s. Some early translators relied on a Latin translation of the Edda, including Cottle. The latest translation by Edward Pettit was published in 2023.

Opinions differ on the best way to translate the text, on the use or rejection of archaic language, and the rendering of terms lacking a clear English analogue. Still, Cottle's 1797 translation is now considered very inaccurate.

A comparison of the second and third verses (lines 5–12) of the Vǫluspá is given below:

Ek man jǫtna ár of borna, þás forðum mik fœdda hǫfðu; níu mank hęima, níu ívíði, mjǫtvið mæran fyr mold neðan. Ár vas alda þars Ymir byggði, vasa sandr né sær, né svalar unnir; jǫrð fansk æva né upphiminn; gap vas ginnunga, ęn gras hvęrgi. (Finnur 1932) (unchanged orthography)	The Jötuns I remember early born, those who me of old have reared. I nine worlds remember, nine trees, the great central tree, beneath the earth. There was in times of old, where Ymir dwelt, nor sand nor sea, nor gelid waves; earth existed not, nor heaven above, 'twas a chaotic chasm, and grass nowhere, (Thorpe 1866)
I remember the Giants born of yore, who bred me up long ago. I remember nine Worlds, nine Sibyls, a glorious Judge beneath the earth. In the beginning, when naught was, there was neither sand nor sea nor the cold waves, nor was earth to be seen nor heaven above. There was a Yawning Chasm [chaos], but grass nowhere, (Vigfússon & Powell 1883) †	I remember of yore were born the Jötuns, they who aforetime fostered me : nine worlds I remember, nine in the Tree, the glorious Fate Tree that springs 'neath the Earth. 'Twas the earliest of times when Ymir lived; then was sand nor sea nor cooling wave, nor was Earth found ever, nor Heaven on high, there was Yawning of Deeps and nowhere grass : (Bray 1908)
I remember yet the giants of yore, Who gave me bread in the days gone by; Nine worlds I knew, the nine in the tree With mighty roots beaneath the mold. Of old was the age when Ymir lived; Sea nor cool waves nor sand there were; Earth had not been, nor heaven above, But a yawning gap, and grass nowhere. (Bellows 1923)	I call to mind the kin of etins which long ago did give me life. Nine worlds I know, the nine abodes of the glorious world-tree the ground beneath. In earliest times did Ymir live: was nor sea nor land nor salty waves, neither earth was there nor upper heaven, but a gaping nothing, and green things nowhere. (Hollander 1962)
I tell of Giants from times forgotten. Those who fed me in former days: Nine worlds I can reckon, nine roots of the Tree. The wonderful Ash, way under the ground When Ymir lived long ago Was no sand or sea, no surging waves. Nowhere was there earth nor heaven above. But a grinning gap and grass nowhere. (Auden & Taylor 1969)	I remember giants of ages past, those who called me one of their kin; I know how nine roots form nine worlds under the earth where the Ash Tree rises. Nothing was there when time began, neither sands nor seas nor cooling waves, Earth was not yet, nor the high heavens, but a gaping emptiness nowhere green. (Terry 1990)
I, born of giants, remember very early those who nurtured me then; I remember nine worlds, I remember nine giant women, the mighty Measuring-Tree below the earth. Young were the years when Ymir made his settlement, there was no sand nor sea nor cool waves; earth was nowhere nor the sky above, chaos yawned, grass was there nowhere. (Larrington 1996)	I remember giants born early in time, who long ago had reared me Nine worlds I remember, nine wood-ogresses, glorious tree of good measure, under the ground. It was early in the ages when Ymir made his dwelling: There was not sand nor sea nor chill waves. Earth was not to be found nor above it heaven: a gulf was there of gaping voids and grass nowhere, (Dronke 1997)
I recall those giants, born early on, who long ago brought me up; nine worlds I recall, nine wood-dwelling witches, the famed tree of fate down under the earth. It was early in ages when Ymir made his home, there was neither sand nor sea, nor cooling waves; no earth to be found, nor heaven above: a gulf beguiling, nor grass anywhere. (Orchard 2011)	I remember being reared by Jotuns, in days long gone. If I look back, I recall nine worlds, nine wood-witches, that renowned tree of fate below the Earth Ymir struck camp when time began. No land, sand or sea folding on itself, no sky, earth or grass swaying atop its girth, only the cavern of chaos's gaping gulf. (Dodds 2014)
I remember giants born early in time those nurtured me long ago; I remember nine worlds, I remember nine giant women, the mighty Measuring-Tree below the earth. Early in time Ymir made his settlement, there was no sand nor sea nor cool waves; earth was nowhere nor the sky above, a void of yawning chaos, grass was there nowhere (Larrington 2014)	I remember the giants born so long ago; in those ancient days they raised me. I remember nine worlds, nine giantesses, and the seed from which Yggdrasil sprang. It was at the very beginning, it was Ymir's time, there was no sand, no sea, no cooling waves, no earth, no sky, no grass, just Ginnungagap. (Crawford 2015)
† The prose translation lacks line breaks, inserted here to match those in the Norse verse given in the same work.

== Allusions and quotations ==
- As noted above, the Prose Edda of Snorri Sturluson makes much use of the works included in the Poetic Edda, though he may well have had access to other compilations that contained the poems and there is no evidence that he used the Poetic Edda or even knew of it.
- The Völsunga saga is a prose version of much of the Niflung cycle of poems. Due to several missing pages (see Great Lacuna) in the Codex Regius, the Völsunga saga is the oldest complete source for the Norse version of much of the story of Sigurð. Only 22 stanzas of the Sigurðarkviða survive in the Codex Regius, plus four stanzas from the missing section which are quoted in the Völsunga saga.
- J. R. R. Tolkien, a philologist and scholar of Old Norse who was familiar with the Eddas, utilized concepts from them in his 1937 fantasy novel The Hobbit, and in other works. For example:
  - The Misty Mountains derive from the úrig fiöll in the Skírnismál.
  - The names of his Dwarves derive from the Dvergatal in the Vǫluspá.
  - His Legend of Sigurd and Gudrún is a verse retelling or reconstruction of the Nibelung poems from the Edda (see Völsunga saga), composed in the Eddaic fornyrðislag metre.

== See also ==
- Old Norse poetry
- Norse mythology
