= Guðrúnarkviða III =

Short Old Norse poem part of the Poetic Edda

Guðrúnarkviða III, The Third Lay of Gudrun, is a short Old Norse poem that is part of the Poetic Edda. It has not left any traces in Völsunga saga and was probably not known by its compilers.

It is dated to the early 11th century, because that was the time when the ordeal by boiling water made its appearance in Scandinavia and the poet speaks of it as a practice of foreign origin. According to Henry Adams Bellows, the poem is based on material that came from northern Germany, where the ordeal by boiling water had long been current. He adds that it has so little local colour that it was probably composed based on a story that the poet had heard from a German.

The Guðrún lays show that the hard-boiled heroic poetry of the Poetic Edda also had a place for the hardships of women.

== Synopsis ==
Herkja, one of Atli's former concubines, was serving as a maid at his court. She reported to Atli that she had seen Guðrún together with King Þjóðrekr, which made Atli very angry. He approached Guðrún and she asked him what was the matter.

1. "Hvat er þér, Atli,
æ, Buðla sonr?
Er þér hryggt í hug?
Hví hlær þú æva?
Hitt mundi æðra
jörlum þykkja,
at við menn mæltir
ok mik sæir."

Atli kvað:
2. "Tregr mik þat, Guðrún
Gjúka dóttir,
mér í höllu
Herkja sagði,
at þit Þjóðrekr
und þaki svæfið
ok léttliga
líni verðið."

1. "What thy sorrow, Atli,
Buthli's son?
Is thy heart heavy-laden?
Why laughest thou never?
It would better befit
the warrior far
To speak with men,
and me to look on."

Atli spake:
2. "It troubles me, Guthrun,
Gjuki's daughter,
What Herkja here
in the hall hath told me,
That thou in the bed
with Thjothrek liest,
Beneath the linen
in lovers' guise."

Guðrún answered that she was innocent and could swear on the sacred white stone that she had not been with Þjóðrekr in that way. She had only talked with Þjóðrekr about their sorrows in secret. Þjóðrekr had arrived with thirty warriors and he had lost all of them, while Atli, her husband, had murdered all her brothers and all the men of her people. Gunnarr could no longer come, and she could no longer greet Högni. She had lost both her beloved brothers and she would like to avenge Högni with her sword. She declared that she wanted payment for her sorrows and she suggested the ordeal of boiling water, for which Atli should summon Saxi, the king of the Southrons, who could hallow the kettle. Then, the poem passes to the execution of the ordeal and what happened to Herkja:

Brá hon til botns
björtum lófa
ok hon upp of tók
jarknasteina:
"Sé nú, seggir,
sykn em ek orðin
heilagliga,
hvé sá hverr velli."

Hló þá Atla
hugr í brjósti,
er hann heilar sá
hendr Guðrúnar:
"Nú skal Herkja
til hvers ganga,
sú er Guðrúnu
grandi vændi."

Sá-at maðr armligt,
hverr er þat sá-at,
hvé þar á Herkju
hendr sviðnuðu;
leiddu þá mey
í mýri fúla.
Svá þá Guðrún
sinna harma.

8. To the bottom she reached
with hand so bright,
And forth she brought
the flashing stones:
"Behold, ye warriors,
well am I cleared
Of sin by the kettle's
sacred boiling."

9. Then Atli's heart
in happiness laughed,
When Guthrun's hand
unhurt he saw;
"Now Herkja shall come
the kettle to try,
She who grief
for Guthrun planned."

10. Ne'er saw man sight
more sad than this,
How burned were the hands
of Herkja then;
In a bog so foul
the maid they flung,
And so was Guthrun's
grief requited.
