= Lacuna (manuscripts) =

Gap in a manuscript, inscription, text, painting, or musical work

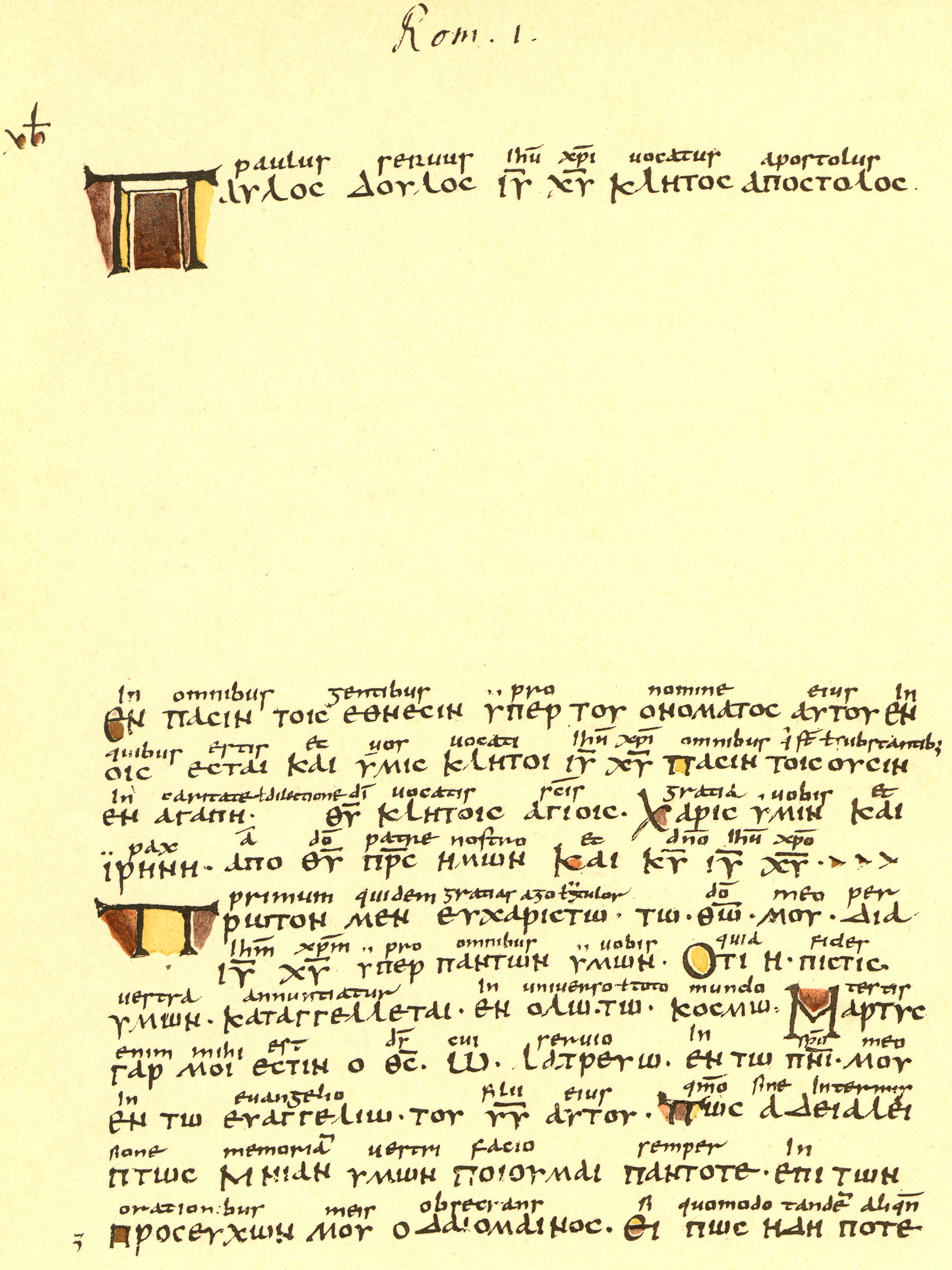
First page of the Codex Boernerianus with lacuna in Romans 1:1–4.

A lacuna (Note: From Latin lacūna ("ditch, gap"), literally "little lacus" ("lake, basin").) (pl. lacunae or lacunas) is a gap in a manuscript, inscription, text, painting, or musical work. A manuscript, text, or section suffering from gaps is said to be "lacunose" or "lacunulose".

Weathering, decay, and other damage to old manuscripts or inscriptions are often responsible for lacunae - words, sentences, or whole passages that are missing or illegible. Palimpsests are particularly vulnerable. To reconstruct the original text, the context must be considered. In papyrology and textual criticism, this may lead to competing reconstructions and interpretations. Published texts that contain lacunae often mark the section where text is missing with a bracketed ellipsis. For example, "This sentence contains 20 words, and [...] nouns," or, "Finally, the army arrived at [...] and made camp."

== Notable examples ==
- In the British Library manuscript Cotton Vitellius A. xv, the Old English poem Beowulf contains the following lacuna:
  hyrde ich thæt [... ...On]elan cwen.
  — Fitt 1, line 62
  This particular lacuna is always reproduced in editions of the text, but many people have attempted to fill it, notably editors Wyatt-Chambers and Dobbie, among others, who accept the verb "waes" (was). Malone (1929) proposed the name Yrse for the unnamed queen, as that would alliterate with Onela. This, however, is still hotly debated amongst editors.
- The eight-leaves-long Great Lacuna in the Codex Regius, the most prominent source for Norse mythology and early Germanic heroic legends. Parts of it survived in independent manuscripts and in prose form in the Völsunga saga.
- In Codex Leicester, the text skips from Acts 10:45 to 14:17 without a break; possibly because a scribe rewrote it from a defective manuscript that was missing those sections.
- Most of Tablet V of the Enūma Eliš, the Babylonian creation myth, has never been recovered.
- The didactic Latin poem Astronomica (Marcus Manilius, c. AD 30–40) contains a lacuna in its fifth book; some believe that only a small portion is missing, while others believe that whole books are lost.
- Cantar de mio Cid contains several lacunae.

== See also ==
- Unfinished work
- Leiden Conventions
- Redaction
- Lost literary work
