= Great Lacuna =

Significant missing section in the Codex Regius

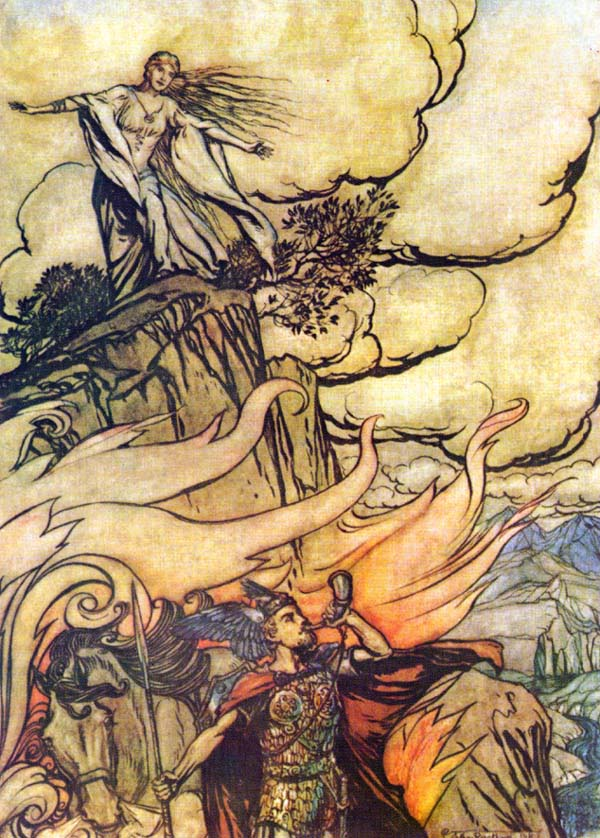
This poem dealt extensively with the relationship of Sigurd and Brynhildr. Illustration by Arthur Rackham.

The Great Lacuna is a lacuna of eight leaves where there was heroic Old Norse poetry in the Codex Regius. The gap would have contained the last part of Sigrdrífumál and most of Sigurðarkviða. What remains of the last poem consists of 22 stanzas called Brot af Sigurðarkviðu, but according to Henry Adams Bellows, the original size of Sigurðarkviða should have been more than 250 stanzas.

The missing original narrative is preserved in the Völsunga saga in prose form with four stanzas of poetry. The first two stanzas that are preserved through the saga deal with how Sigurd returns to Brynhildr leaping through the flames on Grani after Gunnar had failed:

Eldr nam at æsast,
en jörð at skjálfa
ok hár logi
við himni gnæfa.
Fár treystist þar
fylkis rekka
eld at ríða
né yfir stíga.

Sigurðr Grana
sverði keyrði.
Eldr slokknaði
fyr öðlingi,
logi allr lægðist
fyr lofgjörnum.
Bliku reiði,
er Reginn átti.

The fire raged,
the earth was rocked,
The flames leaped high
to heaven itself;
Few were the hardy
heroes would dare
To ride or leap
the raging flames.

Sigurth urged Grani
then with his sword,
The fire slackened
before the hero,
The flames sank low
for the greedy of fame,
The armor flashed
that Regin had fashioned.

Sigurd had, however, been given a potion of forgetfulness and so he had forgotten all about Brynhildr before returning to her. Moreover, he arrived to her disguised as Gunnar, and so Brynhildr was married to Gunnar instead. After the wedding, Brynhildr argues with her sister-in-law Gudrun, who is Sigurd's spouse, and Gudrun reveals to Brynhildr that it was Sigurd who saved her from her prison. Brynhildr who grasps the extent of the treachery of her in-laws (the Gjukungs) against her and Sigurd, speaks out her heart about Gunnar, in the third preserved stanza:

Sigurðr vá at ormi,
en þat síðan mun
engum fyrnast,
meðal öld lifir.
En hlýri þinn
hvárki þorði
eld at ríða
né yfir stíga.

Sigurth the dragon
slew, and that
Will men recall
while the world remains;
But little boldness
thy brother had
To ride or leap
the raging flames.

Brynhildr is furious and so Gunnar and Sigurd talk to her trying to calm her down. Sigurd and Brynhildr have a conversation about the treachery of their mutual in-laws, and understanding how deceived he has been, Sigurd leaves Brynhildr with a heavy heart:

Út gekk Sigurðr
andspjalli frá,
hollvinr lofða
ok hnipnaði,
svá at ganga nam
gunnarfúsum
sundr of síður
serkr járnofinn.

Forth went Sigurth,
and speech he sought not,
The friend of heroes,
his head bowed down;
Such was his grief
that asunder burst
His mail-coat all
of iron wrought.

Brynhild's fury would soon lead to the death of both her and Sigurd and to the end of the Gjukung clan.

J. R. R. Tolkien produced the poems Sigurðarkvida en nyja and Guðrunarkviða en nyja, now published as The Legend of Sigurd and Gudrún, based on the content found in the saga.
