= Frá dauða Sinfjötla =

Old Norse poem in the Poetic Edda

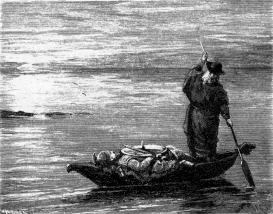
An 1893 depiction of Odin taking the dead Sinfjötli to Valhalla.

Frá dauða Sinfjötla ("On the death of Sinfjötli") is a short prose piece found in the Codex Regius manuscript of the Poetic Edda. It describes the death of Sinfjötli, son of Sigmundr, connecting Helgakviða Hundingsbana II and Grípisspá.

Borghildr, wife of Sigmundr, wanted Sinfjötli, her stepson, dead, as Sinfjötli had killed her brother. Now it is said, that Sigmundr was so tough, that he could withstand any kind of poison, but his sons could only tolerate it on their skins. Borghildr gave them ale, which Sinfjötli recognized as poisoned. He excused himself for two rounds, but when she brought him the third horn, his father, now drunk, said: "Let your beard filter it, son!" Sinfjötli drank and died at once.

The piece is normally published in editions of the Poetic Edda.
