= Brot af Sigurðarkviðu =

Fragmentary Old Norse poem

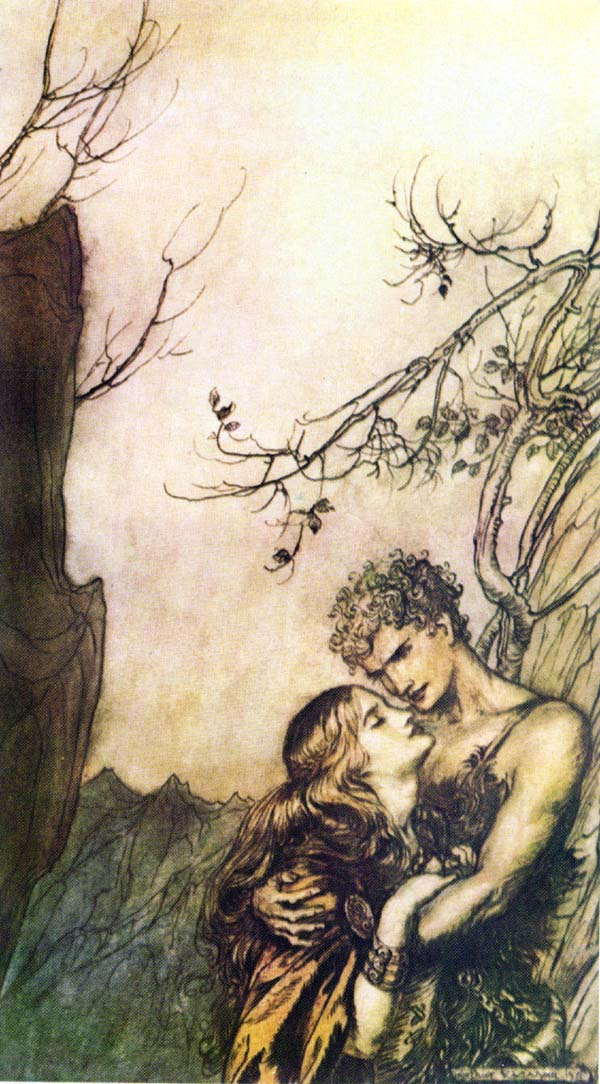
This poem dealt extensively with the meeting of Sigurd and Brynhildr. Illustration by Arthur Rackham.

Brot af Sigurðarkviðu are the remaining 22 stanzas of a heroic Old Norse poem in the Poetic Edda. In the Codex Regius, there is a gap of eight leaves where the first part of the poem would have been found, and also the last part of the Sigrdrífumál. The missing narrative is preserved in the Völsunga saga in prose form with four stanzas of poetry. According to Henry Adams Bellows, the original size of the poem should have been more than 250 stanzas.
