= Sigrdrífumál =

Poem in the Poetic Edda

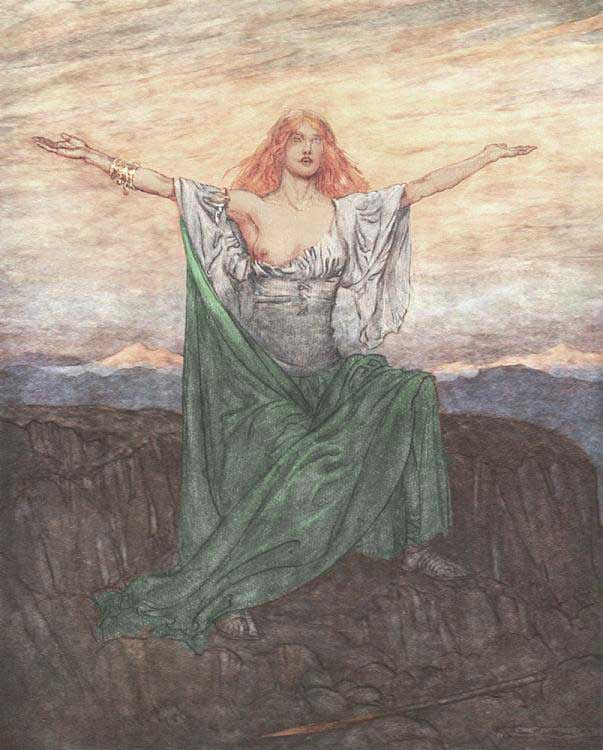
Brünnhilde wakes and greets the day and Siegfried, illustration of the scene of Wagner's Ring inspired by the Sigrdrífumál, by Arthur Rackham (1911).

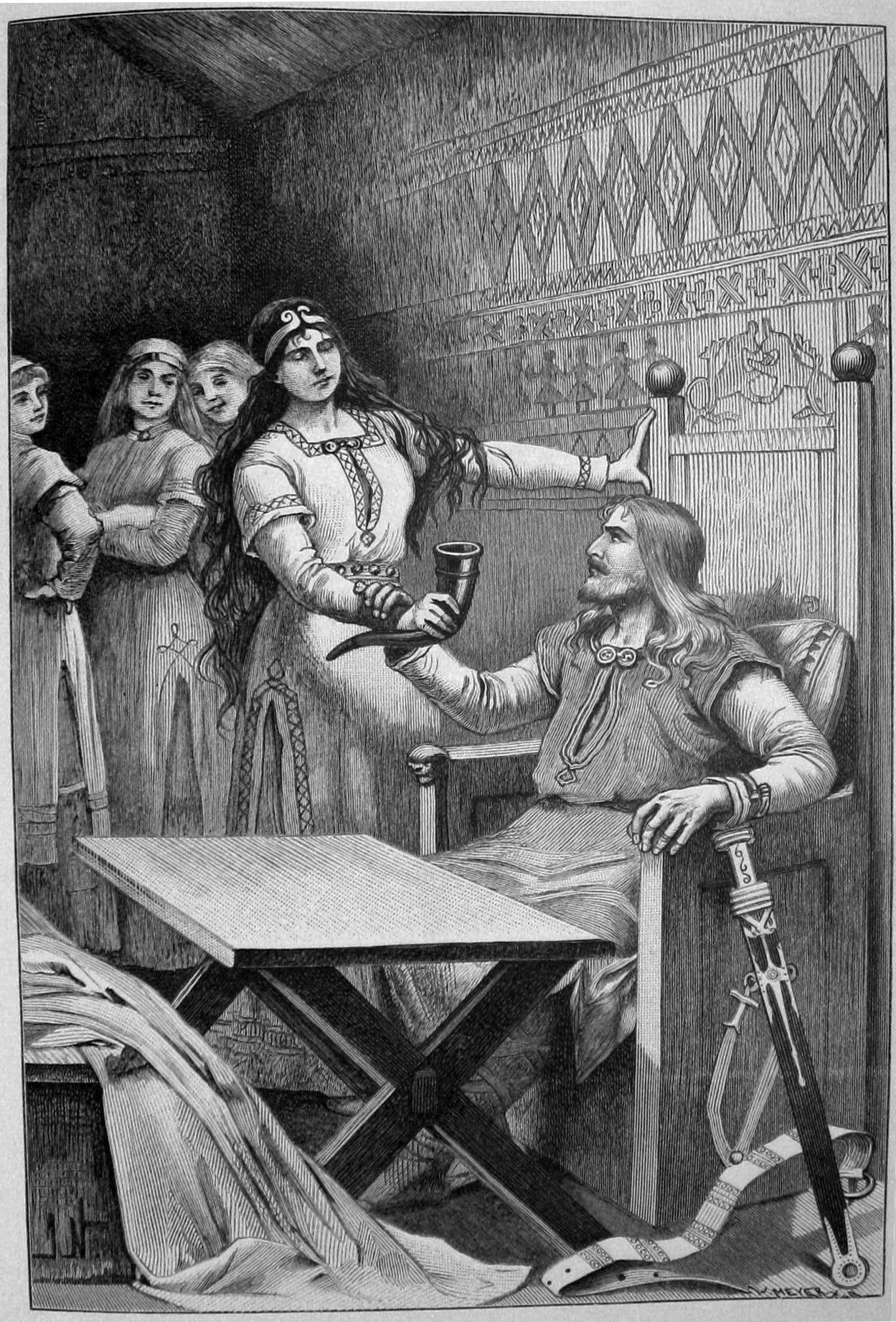
Sigrdrífa gives Sigurðr a horn to drink from. Illustration by Jenny Nyström (1893).

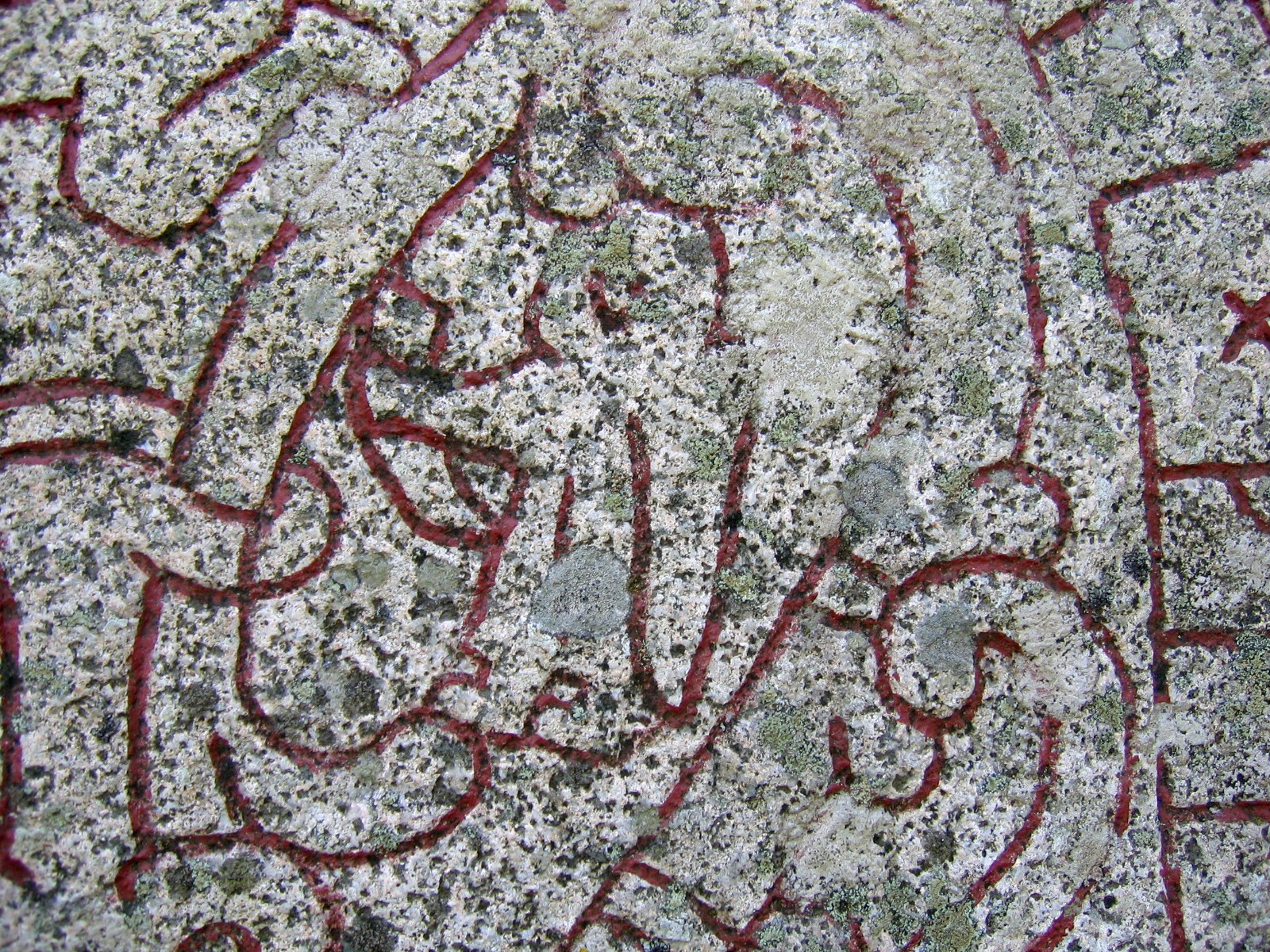
Sigrdrífa giving Sigurd a drinking horn. Illustration on the Drävle Runestone.

Sigrdrífumál (also known as Brynhildarljóð) is the conventional title given to a section of the Poetic Edda text in Codex Regius.

It follows Fáfnismál without interruption, and it relates the meeting of Sigurðr with the valkyrie Brynhildr, here identified as Sigrdrífa ("driver to victory"). Its content consists mostly of verses concerned with runic magic and general wisdom literature, presented as advice given by Sigrdrífa to Sigurd. The metre is differing throughout the poem. Most staves are wrote in ljóðaháttr, but there are also some in fornyrðislag and a few in galdralag.

The end is in the lost part of the manuscript but it has been substituted from younger paper manuscripts. The Völsunga saga describes the scene and contains some of the poem.

== Name ==
The compound sigr-drífa means "driver to victory" (or "victory-urger", "inciter to victory") It occurs only in Fáfnismál (stanza 44) and in stanza 4 of the Sigrdrífumál. In Fáfnismál, it could be a common noun, a synonym of valkyrie, while in Sigrdráfumál it is explicitly used as the name of the valkyrie whose name is given as Hildr or Brynhildr in the Prose Edda. Bellows (1936) emphasizes that sigrdrífa is an epithet of Brynhildr (and not a "second Valkyrie").

== Contents ==
The Sigrdrífumál follows the Fáfnismál without break, and editors are not unanimous in where they set the title. Its state of preservation is the most chaotic in the Eddaic collection. Its end has been lost in the Great Lacuna of the Codex Regius. The text is cut off after the first line of stanza 29, but this stanza has been completed, and eight others have been added, on the evidence of the much later testimony of paper manuscripts.

The poem appears to be a compilation of originally unrelated poems. However, this state of the poem appears to have been available to the author of the Völsungasaga, which cites from eighteen of its stanzas.

The basis of the text appears to be a poem dealing with Sigurd's finding of Brynhild, but only five stanzas (2-4, 20-21) deal with this narrative directly. Stanza 1 is probably taken from another poem about Sigurd and Brynhild. Many critics have argued that it is taken from the same original poem as stanzas 6-10 of Helreid Brynhildar.

In stanzas 6-12, Brynhild teaches Sigurd the magic use of the runes. To this has been added similar passages on rune-lore from unrelated sources, stanzas 5 and 13-19. This passage is the most prolific source about historical runic magic which has been preserved.

Finally, beginning with stanza 22 and running until the end of the preserved text is a set of counsels comparable to those in Loddfáfnismál. This passage is probably an accretion unrelated to the Brynhild fragment, and it contains in turn a number of what are likely interpolations to the original text.

=== The valkyrie's drinking-speech ===
The first three stanzas are spoken by Sigrdrífa after she has been awoken by Sigurd (stanza 1 in Bellows 1936 corresponds to the final stanza 45 of Fáfnismál in the edition of Jonsson 1905).

What is labelled as stanza 4 by Bellows (1936) is actually placed right after stanza 2, introduced only by Hon qvaþ ("she said"), marking it as the reply of the valkyrie to Sigmund's identification of himself in the second half of stanza 1.

The following two stanzas are introduced as follows:

Sigurþr settiz niþr oc spurþi hana nafns. Hon toc þa horn fult miaþar oc gaf hanom minnisveig:
"Sigurth sat beside her and asked her name. She took a horn full of mead and gave him a memory-draught."

Henry Adams Bellows stated in his commentary that stanzas 2-4 are "as fine as anything in Old Norse poetry" and these three stanzas constituted the basis of much of the third act in Richard Wagner's opera Siegfried. This fragment is one of the few direct invocations of the Norse gods which have been preserved, and it is sometimes dubbed a "pagan prayer".

The first two stanzas are given below in close transcription (Bugge 1867), in normalized Old Norse (Finnur Jónsson 1932) and in the translations by Thorpe (1866) and of Bellows (1936):

Heill dagr
heilir dags synir
heil nott oc nipt
oreiþom ꜹgom
litiþ ocr þinig
oc gefit sitiondom sigr

Heilir ęsir
heilar asynior
heil sia in fiolnyta fold
mal oc manvit
gefit ocr męrom tveim
oc lęcnishendr meþan lifom

(ed. Bugge 1867)

Hęill dagr,
hęilir dags synir,
hęil nótt ok nipt;
óręiðum augum
lítið okr þinig
ok gefið sitjǫndum sigr.

Hęilir æsir,
hęilar ǫ́synjur,
hęil sjá hin fjǫlnýta fold,
mál ok manvit
gefið okr mærum tvęim
ok læknishęndr, meðan lifum.

(ed. Finnur Jónsson 1932)

Hail Dag,
Hail Dag's sons,
Hail Nat and Nipt!
Look down upon us
With benevolent eyes
And give victory to the sitting!

Hail Asas,
Hail Asynjes,
Hail bounteous earth!
Words and wisdom
give to us noble twain,
and healing hands in life!

(Thorpe 1866)

Hail, day!
Hail, sons of day!
And night and her daughter now!
Look on us here
with loving eyes,
That waiting we victory win.

Hail to the gods!
Ye goddesses, hail,
And all the generous earth!
Give to us wisdom
and goodly speech,
And healing hands, life-long.

(Bellows 1936)

=== Runic stanzas ===
Stanzas 5-18 concern runic magic, explaining the use of runes in various contexts.

In stanza 5, Sigrdrífa brings Sigurd ale which she has charmed with runes:

Biór fori ec þer / brynþings apaldr!
magni blandinn / oc megintíri;
fullr er hann lioþa / oc licnstafa,
godra galdra / oc gamanrvna.

Translation:

Beer I bring thee, tree of battle,
Mingled of strength and mighty fame;
Charms it holds and healing signs,
Spells full good, and gladness-runes.

Stanza 6 advises to carve "victory runes" on the sword hilt, presumably referring to the t rune named for Tyr:

Sigrúnar þú skalt kunna,
ef þú vilt sigr hafa,
ok rísta á hialti hiǫrs,
sumar á véttrimum,
sumar á valbǫstum,
ok nefna tysvar Tý

Translation:

Victory runes you must know
if you will have victory,
and carve them on the sword's hilt,
some on the grasp
and some on the inlay,
and name Tyr twice.

The following stanzas address Ølrunar "Ale-runes" (7), biargrunar "birth-runes" (8), brimrunar "wave-runes" (9), limrunar "branch-runes" (10), malrunar "speech-runes" (11), hugrunar "thought-runes" (12). Stanzas 13-14 appear to have been taken from a poem about the finding of the runes by Odin. Stanzas 15-17 are again from an unrelated poem, but still about the topic of runes. The same holds for stanzas 18-19, which return to the mythological acquisition of the runes, and the passing of their knowledge to the æsir, elves, vanir and mortal men.

Allar váro af scafnar / þer er váro a ristnar,
oc hverfðar viþ inn helga mioþ
oc sendar a viþa vega;
þer 'ro meþ asom / þer 'ro meþ alfom,
sumar meþ visom vanom
sumar hafa mennzkir menn.

Þat ero bocrunar / þat ero biargrunar
oc allar alrunar
oc metar meginrunar
hveim er þer kná oviltar / oc ospilltar
ser at heillom hafa;
niottu, ef þu namt,
unz riufaz regin.

Translation:

18. Shaved off were the runes that of old were written,
And mixed with the holy mead, And sent on ways so wide;
So the gods had them, so the elves got them,
And some for the Wanes so wise, And some for mortal men.

19. Beech-runes are there, birth-runes are there,
And all the runes of ale. (And the magic runes of might;)
Who knows them rightly and reads them true,
Has them himself to help;
(Ever they aid, till the gods are gone.)

=== Gnomic stanzas ===
Stanzas 20-21 are again in the setting of the frame narrative, with Brynhild asking Sigurd to make a choice. They serve as introduction for the remaining part of the text, stanzas 22-37 (of which, however, only 22-28 and the first line of 29 are preserved in Codex Regius), which are gnomic in nature. Like Loddfáfnismál, the text consists of numbered counsels, running from one to eleven. The "unnumbered" stanzas 25, 27, 30, 34 and 36 are considered interpolations by Bellows (1936).

== Editions and translations ==
- Benjamin Thorpe (trans.), The Edda Of Sæmund The Learned, 1866 online copy, at northvegr.org
- Sophus Bugge, Sæmundar Edda, 1867 (edition of the manuscript text) online copy
- Henry Adams Bellows (1936) (translation and commentary) online copy, at sacred-texts.com
- Guðni Jónsson, Eddukvæði: Sæmundar-Edda, 1949 (edition with normalized spelling)online copy
- W. H. Auden and P. B. Taylor (trans.), The Elder Edda: A Selection, 1969
