= Grípisspá =

Eddic poem

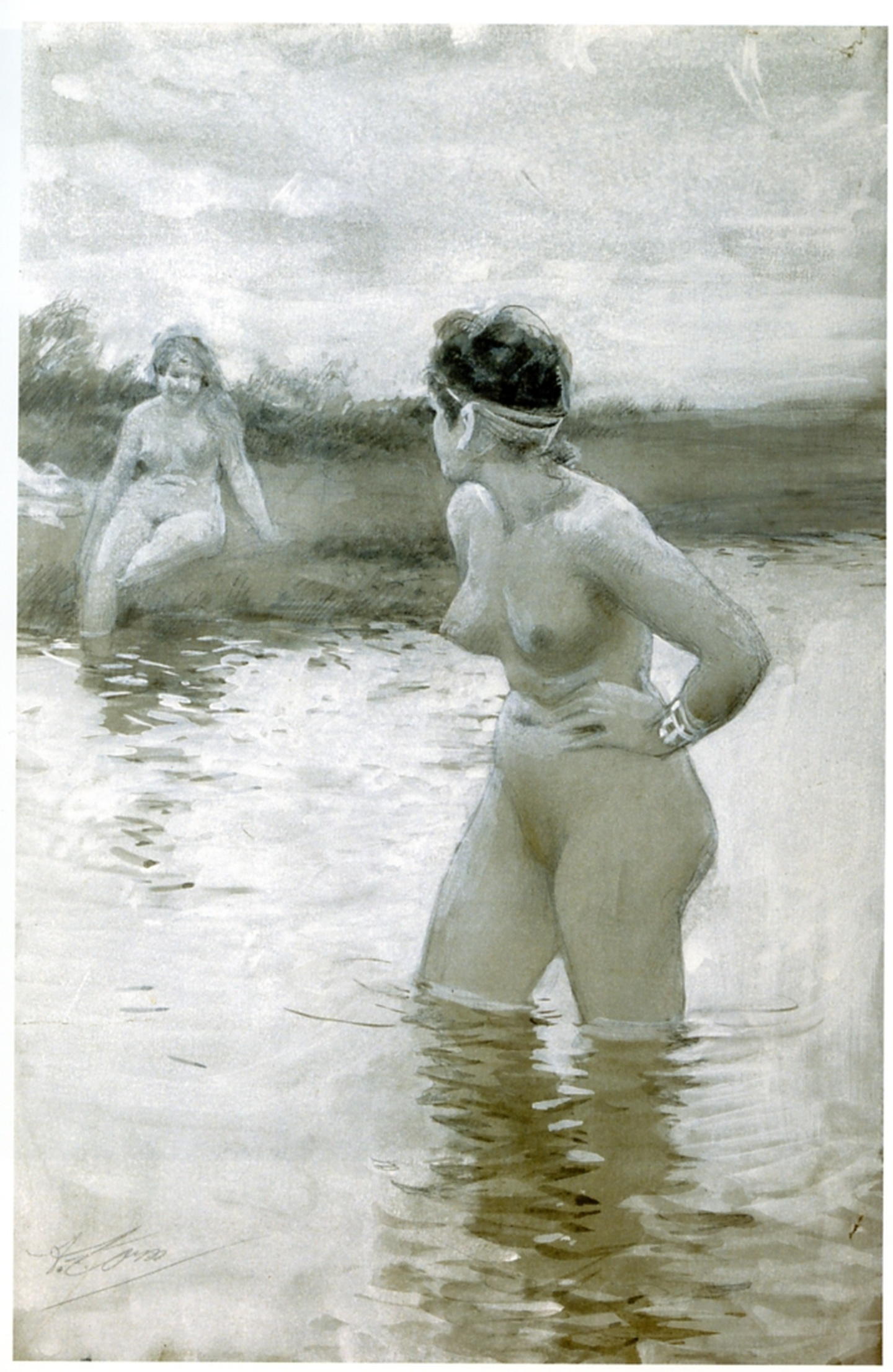
The young Sigurd is foretold about the two women who will shape his destiny, Brynhild and Gudrun. Illustration for Grípispá by Anders Zorn.

Grípisspá (Grípir's prophecy) or Sigurðarkviða Fáfnisbana I ("First Lay of Sigurd Fáfnir's Slayer") is an Eddic poem, found in the Codex Regius manuscript where it follows Frá dauða Sinfjötla and precedes Reginsmál.

The poem consists of a conversation between Sigurd and his uncle, Grípir, who predicts his future at some length, giving an overview of his life. The poem is well preserved and coherent. It is thought to be among the youngest poems of the Codex Regius, dating to the 12th or 13th century. The metre is fornyrðislag.
