= Buðli =

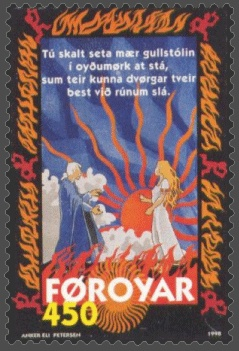
Faroese stamp depicting Brynhild & Buðli

Buðli or Budli is the name of one or two legendary kings from the Scandinavian legendary sagas.

== Ásmundar saga kappabana ==
According to the Ásmundar saga kappabana, Buðli was a Swedish king and the father of Hildr.

The saga relates that Hildr married Helgi, the son of Hildebrand, the king of the Huns. Helgi and Hildr had a son who was raised by his paternal grandfather and named Hildebrand after him.

Hildebrand became a great warrior and was called the Hunnish champion. When his father, Helgi, had fallen in a war, his maternal grandfather, the Swedish King Buðli, was killed by a Danish king by the name of Alf. This Alf took Hildrebrand's mother, Hildr, captive and gave her to the champion Aki with whom she had a son, Asmund, who is the protagonist of the saga.

== Völsunga saga ==
In the Völsunga saga, Buðli was the father of Brynhildr (Brünnehilde).
