= Helreið Brynhildar =

Short Old Norse poem found in the Poetic Edda

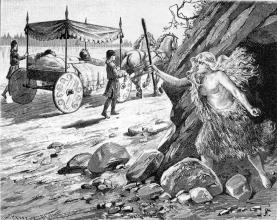
Illustration by Jenny Nyström.

Helreið Brynhildar (Old Norse 'The Hel-ride of Brynhild') is a short Old Norse poem that is found in the Poetic Edda. Most of the poem (except stanza 6) is also quoted in Norna-Gests þáttr.

Henry Adams Bellows says in his commentaries that the poem is a masterpiece with an "extraordinary degree of dramatic unity" and that it is one of the "most vivid and powerful" poems in the Poetic Edda. It has, however, been argued that some parts originally belonged to Sigrdrífumál, and the two poems are anyway very close in content. The material is mostly Scandinavian and there are few elements that connect it with the corresponding German tradition found in the Nibelungenlied.

== Synopsis ==
The poem deals with how the dead Sigurd and Brynhildr are burnt on two pyres. First they burn Sigurd and then they burn Brynhildr who is lying on a richly clad wagon. This wagon takes Brynhildr on her journey to the afterlife. During her journey, she passes a house where a giantess (gýgr) lived.

The giantess accuses Brynhildr of having caused the deaths of heroes and of having wanted another woman's husband (Sigurd). The giantess further accuses Brynhildr of having caused the fall of the house of Nibelungs (Gjúki's sons). Brynhildr responds that she will tell her the truth and how the sons of Gjúki made her an unhappy oath-breaker.

Formerly, she used to be called Hildr the helmed and she lived in a dwelling of valkyries called Hlymdalir. Then a monarch (presumably Agnarr) captured Brynhildr and her seven sisters' by taking their swan-robes that he found under an oak. She was only twelve winters old when she married the young king.

Against the will of Odin, she then made the aged Hjalmgunnar, the king of the Goths, die and instead she gave victory to Auða's young brother (Agnarr). The angry Odin imprisoned her in Skatalund within red and white overlapping shields, and cursed her to sleep until a man without fear would set her free. In order to make it even harder to liberate her, Odin also created a circle of fire around her resting place.

Sigurd then arrived on Grani and brought her Fafnir's gold. The hero shared her bed during eight nights without them touching each other. Still, Gudrun would reproach her for having slept in Sigurd's arms, and then admit to her that they had tricked her out of her relationship with Sigurd and made her take another man instead (Gunnar).

Brynhildr finishes the poem by stating that men and women live in this world to suffer, but that she and Sigurd would never part again:

Munu við ofstríð
alls til lengi
konur ok karlar
kvikvir fæðask;
við skulum okkrum
aldri slíta
Sigurðr saman.
Sökkstu, gýgjar kyn.

Ever with grief
and all too long
Are men and women
born in the world;
But yet we shall live
our lives together,
Sigurth and I.
Sink down, Giantess!
