= Henry Adams Bellows (businessman) =

American businessman and historian (1885–1939)

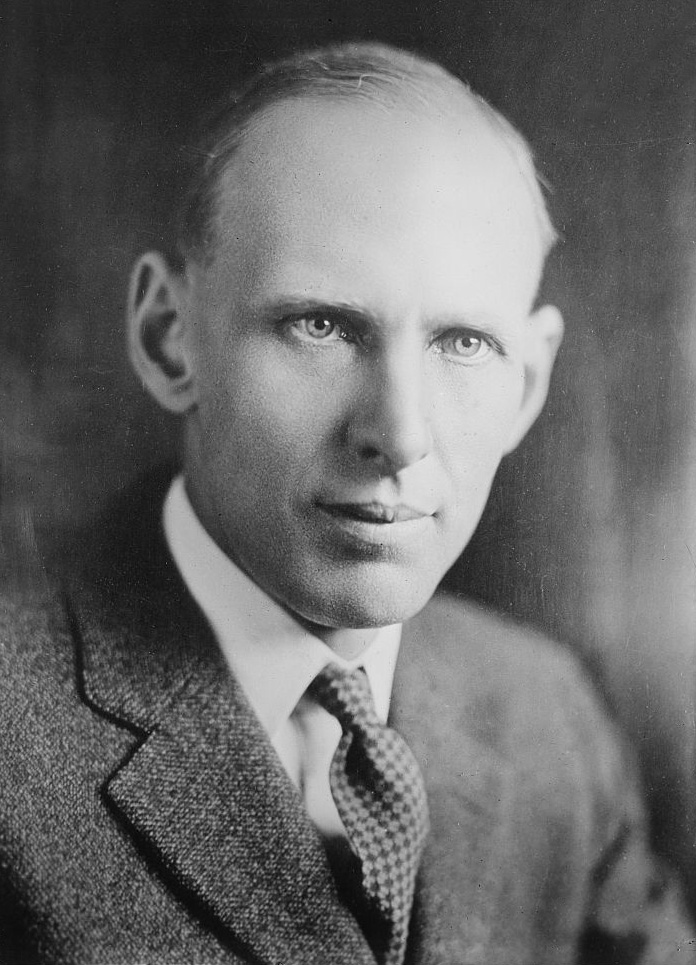
- Bellows in 1917
- Born: September 22, 1885; Portland, Maine, U.S.
- Died: December 29, 1939 (aged 54); Minneapolis, Minnesota, U.S.
- Education: Harvard University (PhD)
- Occupations: Editor and publisher Radio executive Writer and translator
- Known for: U.S. Federal Communications Commission member
- Spouse(s): Mary Sanger (1911; d. 1935); Alice Eels (1936)
- Children: 2

Henry Adams Bellows (September 22, 1885 – December 29, 1939) was an American newspaper editor and radio executive who was an early member of the U.S. Federal Communications Commission. He is also known for his translation of the Poetic Edda for The American-Scandinavian Foundation.

== Life and career ==
Born in Portland, Maine, Bellows graduated from Harvard University in 1906, and then taught English as an assistant there for three years. He received his Ph.D. in 1910 for a dissertation in comparative literature entitled "The Relations between Prose and Metrical Composition in Old Norse Literature" and then became an assistant professor of rhetoric at the University of Minnesota.

From 1912 to 1919 he was managing editor of The Bellman, a Minneapolis literary magazine, vice president of the Bellman Company, and a director of the Miller Publishing Company; from 1914 to 1925 he was managing editor of The Northwestern Miller. He also worked for the Minnesota Orchestra, in 1921–23 was music critic for the Minneapolis Daily News, and in 1925 was the manager of WCCO, one of the top radio stations in the country. He was also a major in the Minnesota Home Guard during World War I.

In 1927 Bellows was appointed as one of the first members of the Federal Radio Commission, predecessor of the Federal Communications Commission. He was technical adviser to the first International Radio Telegraph Conference that year. To forestall greater government interference in broadcasting, he advocated stations' programming individually to meet their listeners' needs; he left the FRC 18 months into his three-year term. From 1928 to 1935, he was a director of the National Association of Broadcasters; he was manager of Northwestern Broadcasting from 1929 to 1934 and a vice president of the Columbia Broadcasting System, forerunner of CBS, from 1930 to 1934. In 1930 he set up a transatlantic exchange for radio programs. His final position was as director of public relations for General Mills, where he founded the department.

He died of lung cancer on December 29, 1939, in Minneapolis, Minnesota.

== Personal life ==
He married Mary Sanger, the daughter of Harvard chemistry professor Charles Robert Sanger, in 1911; they had two children. After her death in 1935, he married a second time in 1936 to Alice Eels.

== Publications ==
Bellows is also known for translating the Poetic Edda for The American-Scandinavian Foundation and Peter Abélard's Historia Calamitatum. The range of his four other books indicates the breadth of his interests: Manual for Local Defense, A Treatise on Riot Duty for National Guards, Highland Light, and Other Poems and A Short History of Flour Milling.
