= List of Icelandic-language poets =

List of Icelandic language poets is a list of poets that write or have written in the Icelandic language, either in Old Norse or a more modern form of Icelandic. Hence the list includes a few Norwegians and an earl of the Orkney Islands. The names given are usually each poet's first name and patronym, unless they are better known by a nickname or a chosen pen name. All names are given in their Modern Icelandic form.

| Name | Dates | Alternative Name(s) | Nationality (if not Icelandic) |
|---|---|---|---|
| Bragi Boddason | fl. 9th century | Bragi inn gamli Boddason | Norwegian |
| Þjóðólfur úr Hvini | fl. 9th century | | Norwegian |
| Þorbjörn hornklofi | fl. 9th century | | Norwegian |
| Egill Skalla-Grímsson | c. 910 – c. 990 | | |
| Eyvindur skáldaspillir | fl. 10th century | Eyvindur Finnsson | Norwegian |
| Kormákur Ögmundarson | fl. 10th century | | |
| Einar skálaglamm | fl. 10th century | Einar Helgason | |
| Gunnlaugur ormstunga | c. 983 – c. 1008 | Gunnlaugur Illugason | |
| Hallfreður vandræðaskáld | fl. 10th – 11th centuries | Hallfreður Óttarsson | |
| Sighvatur Þórðarson | fl. 11th century | | |
| Þórarinn loftunga | fl. 11th century | | |
| Arnór jarlaskáld | fl. 11th century | Arnór Þórðarson | |
| Rögnvaldur Kolsson | died 1158 | Rögnvaldur jarl kali | from Orkney |
| Einar Skúlason | fl. 12th century | | |
| Kolbeinn Tumason | died 1208 | | |
| Snorri Sturluson | 1179 – 1241 | | |
| Þórir Steinfinnsson | died 1238 | Þórir jökull | |
| Ólafur hvítaskáld | died 1259 | Ólafur Þórðarson | |
| Sturla Þórðarson | 1214 – 1284 | | |
| Eysteinn Ásgrímsson | died 1360 | | |
| Jón Arason | 1484 – 1550 | | |
| Magnús Jónsson | died 1595 | Magnús prúði | |
| Jón Bjarnason | c. 1560 – after 1630 | | |
| Ólafur Jónsson | c. 1560 – 1627 | | |
| Hallgrímur Pétursson | 1614 – 1674 | | |
| Steinunn Finnsdóttir | c. 1640 – c. 1710 | | |
| Eggert Ólafsson | 1726 – 1768 | | |
| Hannes Bjarnason | 1777 – 1838 | | |
| Bjarni Thorarensen | 1786 – 1841 | | |
| Sveinbjörn Egilsson | 1791 – 1852 | | |
| Bólu-Hjálmar | 1796 – 1875 | Hjálmar Jónsson | |
| Sigurður Breiðfjörð | 1798 – 1846 | | |
| Jónas Hallgrímsson | 1807 – 1845 | | |
| Jón Thoroddsen | 1818 – 1868 | | |
| Grímur Thomsen | 1820 – 1896 | | |
| Páll Ólafsson | 1827 – 1905 | | |
| Steingrímur Thorsteinsson | 1831 – 1913 | | |
| Matthías Jochumsson | 1835 – 1920 | | |
| Stephan G. Stephansson | 1853 – 1927 | Stefán Guðmundur Guðmundsson | |
| Þorsteinn Erlingsson | 1858 – 1914 | | |
| Kristjan Niels Julius | 1860 – 1936 | Káinn (usually); K. N. (sometimes); K. N. Julius (seldom) | |
| Hannes Hafstein | 1861 – 1922 | | |
| Einar Benediktsson | 1864 – 1940 | | |
| Jóhann Sigurjónsson | 1880 – 1919 | | |
| Hulda | 1881 – 1947 | Unnur Benediktsdóttir Bjarklind | |
| Davíð Stefánsson | 1895 – 1964 | | |
| Jóhannes úr Kötlum | 1899 – 1972 | Jóhannes Jónasson | |
| Jón Helgason | 1899 – 1986 | | |
| Tómas Guðmundsson | 1901 – 1983 | | |
| Þórbergur Þórðarson | 1889 – 1974 | | |
| Halldór Laxness | 1902 – 1998 | Halldór Kiljan Laxness; Halldór Guðjónsson | |
| Steinn Steinarr | 1908 – 1958 | Aðalsteinn Kristmundsson | |
| Kristján Eldjárn | 1916 – 1982 | | |
| Sveinbjörn Beinteinsson | 1924 – 1993 | Sveinbjörn allsherjargoði | |
| Sigfús Daðason | 1928 – 1996 | | |
| Ari Jósefsson | 1939 – 1964 | | |
| Þórarinn Eldjárn | born 1949 | | |
| Þórdís Gísladóttir | born 1965 | | |
| Valdimar Tómasson | born 1971 | | |
