= List of names of Thor =

The Germanic god Thor (Old Norse: Þórr) is referred to by many names in Old Norse poetry and literature. Some of the names come from the Prose Edda list Nafnaþulur, and are not attested elsewhere, while other names are well attested throughout the sources of Norse mythology.

== Names ==
Name (Old Norse)	Name (anglicized)	Name meaning	Attestations
Ásabragr	Asabrag	"Æsir-lord"	Skírnismál (33), Nafnaþulur
Ása-Þórr	Asa-Thor	"Æsir-Thor"	Repeatedly in the Prose Edda, Hárbarðsljóð (52)
Atli		"the terrible"	Nafnaþulur, Þrymlur I (7), Sturlaugsrímur VI (11), Skikkjurímur III (1)
Björn	Bjorn, Biorn	"bear"	Nafnaþulur, Lokrur I (5), III (6)
Einriði or Eindriði	Einridi or Eindridi	"the one who rides alone," perhaps originally "the one who rules alone"	Haustlöng (19), Vellekla (15), Nafnaþulur, Lokrur II (6, 34, 40), III (40)
Ennilangr	Ennilang	"the one with the long forehead"	Nafnaþulur
Harðhugaðr	Hardhugadr	"strong spirit" "powerful soul" "fierce ego" "brave heart"	Þrymskviða (31)
Harðvéurr	Hardveur	"the strong archer"	Nafnaþulur
Hlóriði or Hlórriði	Hloridi or Hlorridi or Hlorrithi	Possibly "the loud rider," "the loud weather-god"; presumably related to Einriði and possibly to a cult-word hlóa	Hymiskviða (4, 16, 27, 29, 37), Lokasenna (54), Þrymskviða (7, 8, 14, 31), Lokrur II (43)
Jarðarburr	Jardarburr	"Son of Jörð"	Þrymskviða (1)
Öku-Þor	Oku-Thor	"Cart Thor" or "Driving Thor", though possibly derived from the Finnish god Ukko ("Ukko-Thor")	Gylfaginning
Rymr	Rym	"noise"	Nafnaþulur, Þrymlur II (6), III (26); Lokrur I (27)
Sönnungr	Sonnung	Possibly "the true one"	Nafnaþulur, Lokrur IV (8)
Véþormr	Vethorm	"Protector of the shrine" but may not apply to Thor	Arinbjarnarkviða (19)
Véuðr or Véoðr	Veud or Veod	Possibly variant of Véurr	Nafnaþulur
Véurr	Veur	Possibly "guard of the shrine" Possibly "hallower"	Hymiskviða (11, 17, 21), Völuspá
Vingþórr	Vingthor	Possibly "battle-Thor" Possibly "hallower"	Þrymskviða (1), Alvíssmál (6), Nafnaþulur

== See also ==
- List of names of Odin
- List of names of Freyr
- List of kennings
