= Steinunn Finnsdóttir =

17th-century Icelandic poet

Steinunn Finnsdóttir (c. 1640 – c. 1710) was the first known Icelandic female writer to leave a substantial body of poetry. Her major works are two rímur cycles: Hyndlu rímur and Snækóngs rímur. She also composed vikivaki carols, occasional verses and a poem on mediaeval Icelandic heroes. The material in both of Steinunn's rímur cycles is drawn from earlier fairy tale ballads and in each case the main character is a woman who has been placed under a spell, one turned into a dog and the other into a man.

Early commentators considered Steinunn an unoriginal minor figure in the history of Icelandic literature but recent critics have praised her for the originality of her mansöngvar and her "vision of a more just social system".
