= Eldjárn =

Eldjárn or Eldjarn is a surname. Notable people with the surname include:

- Ari Eldjárn (born 1981), Icelandic comedian
- Halldóra Eldjárn (1923–2008), First Lady of Iceland, 1968–80
- Kristján Eldjárn (1916–1982), President of Iceland, 1968–80
- Lorentz Eldjarn (1920–2007), Norwegian biochemist
- Þórarinn Eldjárn (born 1949), Icelandic writer
