= Skáld-Helga rímur =

Skáld-Helga rímur ('the rímur of Poet-Helgi', also Skáldhelga rímur or Skáldhelgarímur) is an Icelandic rímur-poem from the 1400s. The poem comprises seven rímur, based on a now lost Íslendingasaga, Skáld-Helga saga, set around the first half of the eleventh century. Each ríma begins with a mansöngr.

The main character is the poet Helgi Þórðarson, portrayed as a retained of Erik Håkonsson and Olaf the Holy. Later, he travels to Rome and meets the Pope, before proceeding to Greenland, where he ends his days as a law-man at Brattahlíð. The main theme of the rímur is the passionate love between Helgi and his betrothed, Þórkatla, from whom he is separated by fate and by human wickedness. The staves, which are based on variants of the metre ferskeytt, are often very sentimental. From the fourth ríma onwards, when Helgi goes to Greenland, there are also lurid supernatural elements: Helgi's boat is boarded by a walking corpse, while Greenland proves a den of robbers ruled by a witch.

The composer of the rímur is unknown, but probably a priest or monk, since Helgi is portrayed as quite religious. Although the original saga is now lost, later prose version of the rímur do exist under the name Skáld-Helga saga.

The oldest manuscript of the rímur is Staðarhólsbók (Reykjavík, Stofnun Árna Magnússonar, AM 604, 4to).

== Editions ==
- Skáld-Helga rímur in Finnur Jónssons Rímnasafn: Samling af de ældste islandske rimer, part 1, København 1905.

== Translations ==
- Finnur Magnússon and Carl Christian Rafn Skjald-Helge, Grönlands laugmand (Skáldhelgarímur), in Grønlands historiske Mindesmærker, I, København 1838.
