= Þrymlur =

Icelandic mythological rímur cycle

Þrymlur is an mythological rímur cycle dated to the 15th century. Þrymlur narrates Thor's reclaiming of his hammer Mjöllnir from the giant Þrymr, a myth also preserved in the Eddic poem Þrymskviða. The version in Þrymlur is believed to be based on that of Þrymskviða, but is in some respects more detailed and has some independent elements.

The cycle consists of three rímur, each in a different verse form. The first is in ferskeytt, the second in braghent and the third in stafhent. The rímur are only preserved in one medieval manuscript, Staðarhólsbók. The beginning of the first ríma is lost.

Sophus Bugge argued that the Scandinavian ballad Torsvisen was originally based on Þrymlur, pointing out some parallels. Finnur Jónsson and Björn Karel Þórólfsson regarded this as highly improbable.

== Editions ==
- Early Icelandic rímur. (Corpus codicum Islandicorum medii aevi 11). 1938. Ed. Craigie, William A. Copenhagen. Facsimile edition.
- Fernir forníslenskir rímnaflokkar. 1896. Ed. Finnur Jónsson. Copenhagen. Edition with normalized spelling.
- Rímnasafn: Samling af de ældste islandske rimer. I–II. 1905–1922. Ed. Finnur Jónsson. Copenhagen. Diplomatic edition.
- The Bearded Bride: a critical edition of Þrymlur. 2020. Ed. and trans. Lee Colwill and Haukur Þorgeirsson. London. Critical edition with English translation.

== Secondary sources ==
- Björn Karel Þórólfsson (1934). Rímur fyrir 1600. Safn Fræðafjelagsins um Ísland og Íslendinga IX. Kaupmannahöfn: S.L. Möller.
- Bugge, Sophus; Moe, Moltke (1897). Torsvisen i sin norske Form. Christiania: Centraltrykkeriet.
- Finnur Jónsson (1920). Den oldnorske og oldislandske litteraturs historie (in Danish). Vol. 1 (2 ed.). København: G. E. C. Gad. pp. 162–167.
  - —— (1924). Den oldnorske og oldislandske litteraturs historie (in Danish). Vol. 3 (2 ed.). København: G. E. C. Gad.
- Jón Þorkelsson (1888). Om digtningen på Island i det 15. og 16. århundrede. København: A. F. Høst.
- Sverrir Tómasson (1996). "Nýsköpun eða endurtekning? Íslensk skáldmennt og Snorra Edda fram til 1609." Guðamjöður og arnarleir: Safn ritgerða um eddulist. Ed. Sverrir Tómasson. Reykjavík:1–64.
- Vésteinn Ólason (1999). "Rímur og miðaldarómantík". Heiðin minni. Eds. Haraldur Bessason and Baldur Hafstað. Reykjavík:221–239.
