= Ólafs ríma Haraldssonar =

14th-century ríma

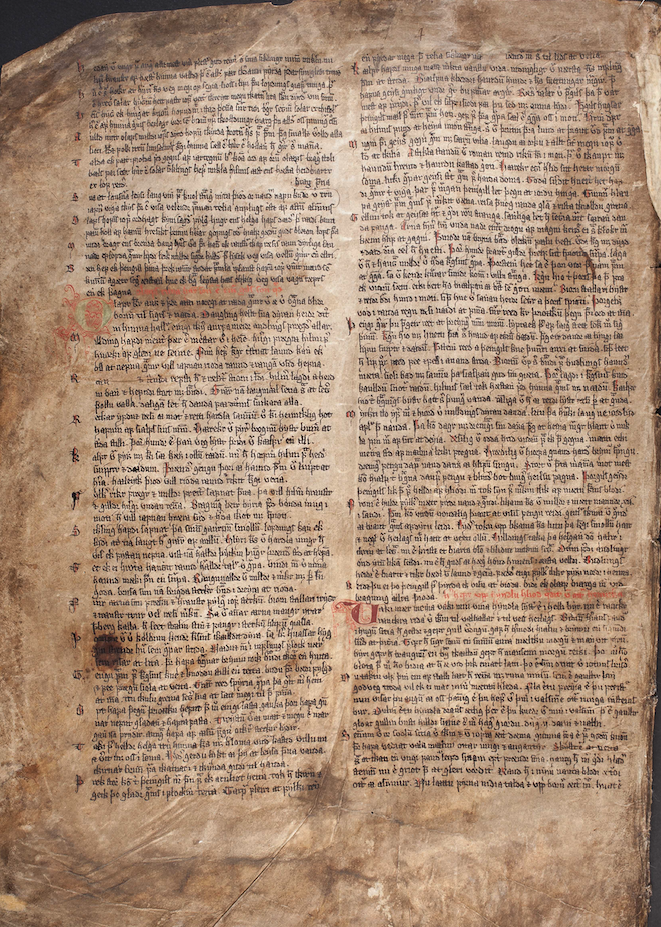

Ólafs ríma Haraldssonar is a 14th-century ríma by the Icelandic poet and official Einarr Gilsson on the career of Saint Óláfr Haraldsson (King Olaf II) of Norway.

The work is preserved in Iceland's Flateyjarbók, from around 1390, and was probably composed a couple of decades earlier. The narrative follows the account of Óláfr's life in Heimskringla, focusing on the Battle of Stiklestad and Óláfr's miracles after his death. The work is literary though the diction is simple. The ríma consists of 65 ferskeytt verses. There is no mansöngr.

Ólafs ríma is often considered the earliest ríma.
