= Landrés rímur =

Landrés rímur is a 15th century rímur cycle based on a part of Karlamagnús saga. It deals with the tribulations of Queen Ólíf and her son Landrés who are betrayed by the evil Mílon. From the mansöngr of the rímur, it is clear that the author was a woman. This is the only known case of female authorship for a medieval rímur cycle. The cycle was dated by Finnur Jónsson as "hardly younger than 1450" and by Haukur Þorgeirsson to the period 1450–1500. The oldest surviving manuscript is the mid-16th century vellum manuscript Staðarhólsbók. The cycle was printed as part of Finnur Jónsson's Rímnasafn edition of the oldest rímur.
