= Þrymr =

Norse mythical character

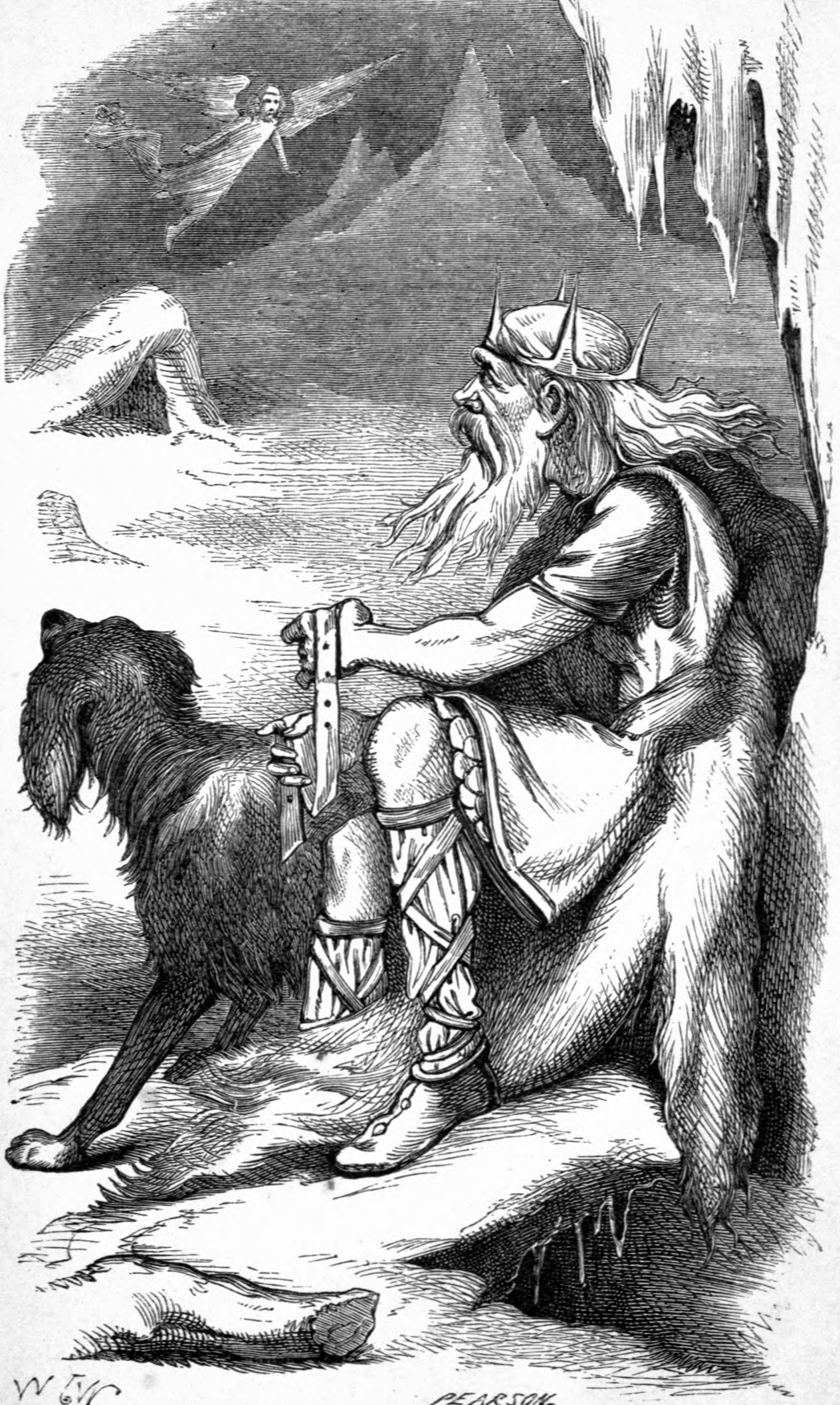
Loki finds Þrymr busy with a dog leash. An 1871 engraving by George Pearson, from a design by W. J. Wiegand

In Norse mythology, Þrymr (Thrymr, Thrym; "noise") was a jötunn. He is the namesake of the Eddic poem Þrymskviða, in which he stole Thor's hammer Mjǫlnir, and the same tale is told in Þrymlur. Another mention of Þrymr is in the þulur appended to the Prose Edda, probably deriving from Þrymskviða. Three figures named Þrymr, including a king and a jötunn, are mentioned in Hversu Noregr byggðist.

== Þrymskviða ==
Through Loki, Þrymr conveys his demand for the goddess Freyja's hand in marriage as the price for returning Mjǫlnir, which he has buried eight leagues under the ground. When Loki flies to Jǫtunheimar using Freyja's feather cloak, he finds Þrymr sitting on a mound, twisting gold leashes for his dogs and primping his horses' manes. He is repeatedly described as þursa dróttinn ("lord of thurses").

To recover his hammer, Thor travels to Jǫtunheimar disguised as Freyja, in bridal drag; when Þrymr peeps under "her" veil, seeking a kiss from his bride, Thor's glare sends him reeling the length of the hall. Nonetheless, Þrymr is stupid enough to believe the explanations of "Freyja's handmaiden", Loki. Thor regains his weapon when Þrymr has it brought out and laid in Thor's lap to bless their union, and strikes Þrymr dead first, followed by all his assembled kin and following.

== Hversu Noregr byggðist ==
Three figures named Þrymr are mentioned in Hversu Noregr byggðist, which recounts the story of the early settlement of Norway. These figures are:

- Þrymr, son of Gard Agdi and ruler of Agder. This Þrymr had sons named Agði and Agnarr.
- Ketill Þrymr, grandson of the first Þrymr through his son Agnarr. Ketill Þrymr lived in Þrum. Ketill Þrymr also appears in Gunnars þáttr Þiðrandabana.
- Þrymr, the jötunn of Verma. This Þrymr is the father of Bergfinn and Bergdísa. Bergdísa had three children by King Raum the Old, who each inherited land from their father and had further offspring.

== See also ==
- Þrymheimr, the home of another jotun, Þjazi, and his daughter, the goddess Skaði.
