= Ari Jósefsson =

Icelandic poet

- Born: Ari Jóhannes Jósefsson; August 28, 1939; Blönduós, Iceland
- Died: June 18, 1964 (aged 24)
- Occupation: Poet
- Notable work: Nei (1961)

Ari Jósefsson (28 August 1939 – 18 June 1964) was an Icelandic poet. He published only one book of poetry during his lifetime, entitled Nei (1961), meaning "No" in Icelandic. The book sold out its first printing. The third edition of the book includes three short stories by Jósefsson.

He attended Akureyri Junior College, but left. Jósefsson spent the winter of 1959-1960 in Barcelona, and continued his studies at Reykjavik Junior College, where he graduated in 1961. He went to Romania and was a student in romance studies. While on his way home to Reykjavík, after completing his studies, he fell overboard from the ship Gullfoss and drowned on 18 June 1964.

== Works ==
Nei (1961)

== See also ==
- List of Icelandic-language poets
- List of Icelandic writers
- Culture of Iceland
