= Bryggen inscriptions =

Medieval runic inscriptions in Bergen, Norway

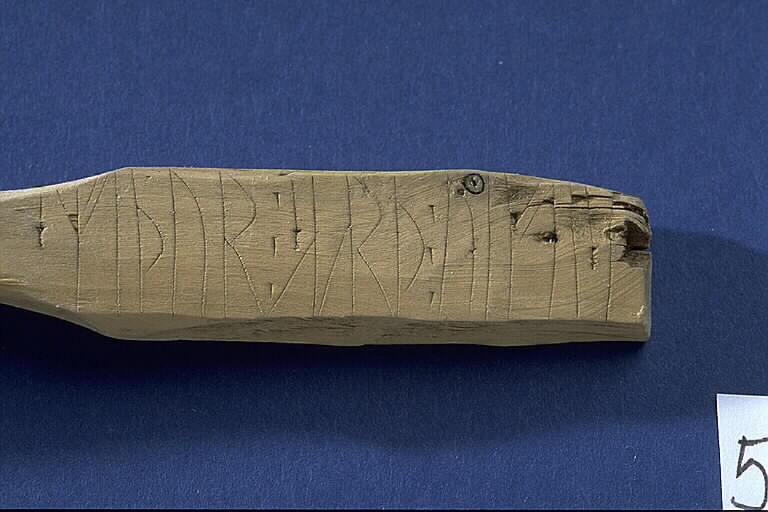
Rune carving on a stick from Bryggen, Bergen, Norway.

The Bryggen inscriptions are a find of some 670 medieval runic inscriptions on wood (mostly pine) and bone found since 1955 at Bryggen and its surroundings in Bergen, Norway. It has been called the most important runic find in the twentieth century. Before the find of these inscriptions, there was doubt whether the runes were ever used for anything else than inscriptions of names and solemn phrases. The Bryggen find showed the everyday use that runes had in this area, and presumably in other parts of Scandinavia as well. Another important aspect of the find was that many of the inscriptions were obviously at least as recent as the 14th century. Previously it was believed that the use of runes in Norway had died out long before.

The inscriptions have numbers for Bergen finds, mostly "B" followed by three figures.

Many of the inscriptions follow the formula Eysteinn á mik (Eysteinn owns me, B001), and were most likely used as markers of property – like modern-day name tags. Some contain short messages of different types, such as Ást min, kyss mik (my darling, kiss me, B017) and others have longer messages such as business letters and orders. Yet others contain short religious inscriptions, often in Latin, such as Rex Judæorum In nomine Patris Nazarenus (B005) and may have been intended as amulets.

The inscriptions are currently kept at Bryggens Museum in Bergen, and some are on display.

== Examples found at Bryggen or nearby ==
B #	Transliterated Text	Normalized Text	English translation	Object inscribed	External image links
B001	øystein:ami hærmaþr haæþrmþr hærmaþr maria	Eysteinn á mi[k] Herrmaðr Herrmaðr Herrmaðr Maria.	Eystein owns me warrior warrior warrior Maria	Runekjevle (wooden cylinder)	Image Image
B003	auema	Ave Maria	Hail Mary (Latin text)	Wooden plate	Image Image
B004	io(an)a	Jóhann á	Johan owns	Skull of walrus	Image Image
B005	rexiudeorum innomini patrisnazarenus	Rex Judæorum In nomine Patris Nazarenus	King of the Jews in the name of the Father of Nazareth (in Latin)	Part of a small wooden cross	Image
B006	benatit a g l a la lagla [.](ln)bastii marhret. a g la ag l a ba. flkarel bar(aþ)olis			Wooden cross	Image
B007	a(ue)m(ar)ia	Ave Maria	Hail Mary (Latin text)	Bottom piece of a wooden bowl	Image
B008	ly(an)þkat(af)mn(un)æruþkit			Shoe	Image
B009	3/1 3/2 3/3 3/4 3/5 = fuþor þbiss	Fuþor	Fuþor	Cane	Image
B010	tar				
B011	felleg er fuþ sin bylli fuþorglbasm	Féligr er fuð sinn byrli Fuðorglbasm.	Lovely is the pussy, may the prick fill it up!	Flat wooden stick	Image Image
B012	inra	... inr á	... -inr owns	Flat wooden stick	Image
B013	mikæl petr ioanes andres lafranz tomas olafr klemet nikulas allerhælger mengiætaimin notouk dahilfsminsouk salokuþsemikoksihni=kuÞkifiosbyrokkafomarih[..[lbemer ethialbemerallegzhlkarh[ ... ]	Mikjáll, Pétr, Jóanes, Andreas, Lafranz, Thomas, Ólafr, Klemetr, Nikulás. Allir helgir menn, gæti mín nótt ok dag, lífs míns ok sálu. Guð sé mik ok signi. Guð gefi oss byr ok gáfu Mariu. H{já}lpi mér Klemetr, hjalpi mér allir Guðs helgir (menn)	Michael, Peter, John, Andrew, Lawrence, Thomas, Olaf, Clement, Nicholas. All saints, guard me night and day, my life and soul. God see me and bless. God give us ... and Mary's gifts. Help me Clement, help me all God's saints.	Flat wooden stick, with a hole at the end.	Image
B014	d(el)us	deus	god (in Latin)	Piece of wood, shaped into a narrow cross.	Image Image
B015	iuairfuþo	... fuþo	... fuþo	Wood stick.	Image
B016	a			Piece of wood	Image Image
B017	ost min kis mik fuþorkhniastbmly	Ást min, kyss mik Fuþorkhniastbmly	My love, kiss me Fuþorkhniastbmly	Wooden stick	Image Image
B018	þr:inliossa:log:rostirriþatbiþa:(aþ) yþænþuæt[-]nuka:ældiriþsu(an)ahiþar: s(au)dælakumlynhuit(an)ha[--]klko lotak(ol)ahbohas(ol)ar:fiartar:tahs[--] [ ... ]kuiþi þækanukabækiiar			Piece of wood	Image Image Image Image
B019	yakæyrfiar rakæyrfiar			Squared broken wood piece	Image
B020	blm[- fuþorkhniastblmy	blm[- Fuþorkhniastblmy	Fuþorkhniastblmy	Smoothed piece of wood	Image Image
B149	kya : sæhir : atþu : kakhæim : þ(an)sak : (ab)akist(an) : rþis	Gyða segir at þú gakk heim	Gyða tells you to go home	Wooden stick	Image

== Other interesting inscriptions ==
- One of the inscriptions, listed as N B145, refers to the pagan Norns. It has both a complete Skaldic dróttkvætt verse and Virgil's famous verse "Omnia vincit amor et nos cedamus amori" engraved.
- Another one, listed as N B368 M was written on the wax tablet and was supposed to be hidden under the layer of wax with some trivial writing. It was a top-secret message calling to someone to change the sides in the civil war: "I would ask you this, that you leave your party. Cut a letter in runes to Ólafr Hettusveinn's sister. She is in the convent in Bergen. Ask her and your kin for advice when you want to come to terms. You, surely, are less stubborn than the Earl." The letter was continued on another wax tablet. Ólafr Hettusveinn is probably Olav Ugjæva, died in 1169.
- N B257 (dated ca. 1335) is a poetic charm, apparently a piece of love magic, similar in content to a curse in the Eddaic poem Skírnismál.
- Likewise, N B380 contains a pagan inscription, reading ”May you be healthy, and in good spirits. May Þórr receive you, may Óðinn own you.”

== See also ==
- Birch bark document
- List of runestones

== Bibliography ==
- Spurkland, Terje (2005): Norwegian Runes and Runic Inscriptions, Translated by Betsy van der Hoek, Boydell Press, Woodbridge
