= Bryggen Runic inscription 145 =

Coordinates: 60.398°N 5.32°E

Bryggen inscription 145
- Writing: Younger Futhark
- Created: ca. 1250
- Discovered: 20th century Søndre Engelgården, Bryggen, Bergen
- Culture: Norse
- Rundata ID: N B145

Text – Native
- Old Norse: See article.

Translation
- See article.

Bryggen inscription 145 (N B145 in Rundata) is a runic inscription on a wooden stick found among the medieval rune-staves of Bergen. It has four sides, and dates to around the year 1200. It is notable not only for containing a rare Skaldic love poem in the form of a complete dróttkvætt stanza, but also a quote from the classical Latin poet Virgil, illustrating the coexistence of native Norse and Classical education in medieval Norway.

== Inscription ==
The lines §A, §B and §D have all been carved by the same hand, while §C appears to have been executed by another, less experienced rune-carver.

Transliteration from Scandinavian Runic-text Database (Rundata), with minor changes.

fe=ll · til · friþra=r · þ(e)=llu · fa=rl(e)=gh=ra=r · m(e)=r · a=rla · fiska=ll · festiba=la · fo=rn · byr hama=r
Fell {} til {} fríðrar {} þellu {} fárligrar {} mér {} árla {} fiskáls {} festibála {} forn {} byrr hamar

no=r=na · þæim (u)ihdi · he=uir þunda=r · þo=rnluþrs · (e)o=lun·buþa=r · g=lo=uma=r · gyghia=rto=uma
norna; {} þeim lundi {} hefir Þundar {} þornlúðrs {} jǫlunbúðar {} glauma {} gýgjartauma

ka=lt=rs falkha · haldet ⁓ omnia : uinsciþ · amo=r · æþ nos c=(c)itam(m)-- · amori ·
galdrs fastliga {} haldit. {} Omnia {} vincit {} Amor, {} et nos cedam[us] {} Amori. {}

ga=ld=rs fasl(e)=gha · haldet ⁓ omnia · uinciþ · amo=r · æþ · nos · c(e)damus · amori ·
galdrs fastliga {} haldit. {} Omnia {} vincit {} Amor, {} et {} nos {} cedamus {} Amori. {}

== Interpretation ==
=== Old West Norse and Latin normalization ===
Note that lundi is emendated from the nonsensical and metrically faulty uihdi of the inscription.

Fell til fríðrar þellu
fárligrar mér árla
fiskáls festibála
forn byrr hamarnorna.
Þeim lundi hefir Þundar
þornlúðrs jǫlunbúðar
glauma gýgjartauma
galdrs fastliga haldit.
Omnia vincit Amor, et nos cedam[us] Amori.

=== English translation ===
The first helmingr (half-verse) is relatively straight forward. It translates (with kennings in brackets):

The ancient breeze of the cliff-goddesses [GIANTESSES > DESIRE] fell to me early with respect to the beautiful, dangerous young pine-tree of the fastened fire of the fish expanse [SEA > GOLD > (beautiful, dangerous, young) WOMAN].

Simplified, this means:

Desire for the beautiful, dangerous young woman overcame me a long time ago.

Finally, the Latin quote at the end is from Eclogue X by Virgil, and means "Love conquers all; let us, too, yield to love!".

== Literature ==
- Marold, Edith. 1998d. Runeninschriften als Quelle zur Geschichte der Skaldendichtung. In Düwel et al. 1998, 667-93.
- Margaret Clunies Ross (2011) [2005]. A History of Old Norse Poetry and Poetics. Cambridge: Brewer. ISBN 9781843842798.
