= Skáld-Helga saga =

Lost Icelandic saga

Skáld-Helga saga (the saga of poet-Helgi) is a lost Íslendingasaga. The action is set in Iceland, Norway, and Greenland from around 1000 to 1050. The main character is Helgi Þórðarson, who travels to Greenland and becomes a prominent figure at Brattahlíð. The contents are first attested in the fourteenth-century rímur Skáld-Helga rímur, but this was rewritten as a prose saga in the modern period, and is known through Gísli Konráðsson's account of c. 1820.

== Manuscripts ==
- List and photographs of some of the manuscripts.

== Editions ==
- Skáld-Helga saga: Sagan af Skáld-Helga, [ed. by Sigfús Eymundsson] (Prentsmiðja Dagskrár, 1897)
- Gudni Jónsson's edition

== Translations ==
- The Saga of Gunnlaug Snake-Tongue together with The Tale of Scald-Helgi, trans. by Alan Boucher (Reykjavík: Iceland Review, 1983), pp. 56–73.
