= Bryggen Runic inscription 257 =

Coordinates: 60.398°N 5.32°E

Bergen rune charm
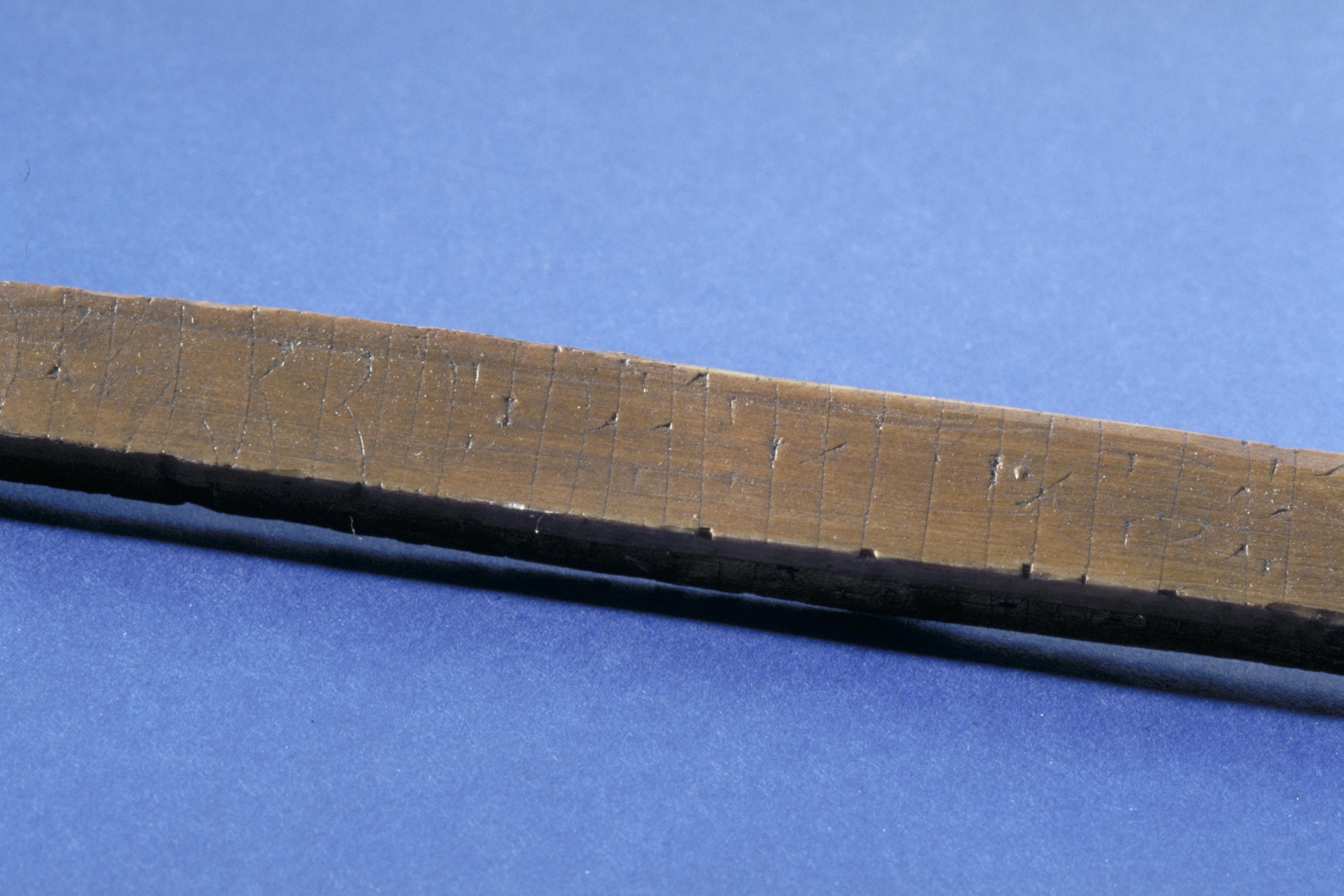
- Detail of side B of the stick, the section shown is ua=lkyrriu : sua:at : eæi mehi : þo:at.
- Writing: Younger Futhark
- Created: ca. 1335
- Discovered: 20th century Søndre Gullskoen, Bryggen, Bergen
- Culture: Norse
- Rundata ID: N B257

Text – Native
- Old Norse: See article.

Translation
- See article.

The Bergen rune charm is a runic inscription on a piece of wood found among the medieval rune-staves of Bergen. It is noted for its similarities to the Eddaic poem Skírnismál (particularly stanza 36); as a rare example of a poetic rune-stave inscription; and of runes being used in love magic.

The inscription has number 257 in the Bryggen inscriptions numbering and N B257 (Norway Bryggen no. 257) in the Rundata database, and P 6 in McKinnell, Simek and Düwel's collection.

It is thought to date from the fourteenth century.

== Description ==
The stave is four-sided, with text on each side, but one end is missing, leaving the text of each side incomplete. It is dated to ca. 1335, making it roughly contemporary to the Ribe healing-stick (ca. 1300).

== Inscription ==
The Scandinavian Runic-text Database (Rundata) gives the following transliteration, normalization, and translation for the stick:

rist e=k : bot:runa=r : rist : e=k biabh:runa=r : eæin:fa=l uiþ : a=luom : tuiua=lt uiþ : t=rolom : þreua=lt : uiþ : þ(u)--
Ríst ek {} bótrúnar, {} ríst {} ek bjargrúnar, {} einfalt við {} alfum, {} tvífalt við {} trollum, {} þrífalt {} við {} þurs[um],
I cut runes of help; I cut runes of protection; once against the elves, twice against the trolls, thrice against the ogres …

uiþ e=nne : skøþo : skah : ua=lkyrriu : sua:at : eæi mehi : þo:at æ uili : læuis : kona : liui : þinu g- -
við inni {} skoðu {} skag(?) {} valkyrju, {} svát {} ei megi, {} þótt æ vili, {} lævís {} kona, {} lífi {} þínu g[randa], …
against the harmful 'skag'-valkyrie, so that she never shall, though she ever would-evil woman!-(injure) your life …

e=k sende=r : þer : ek se a þe=r : ylhia=r : e=rhi o=k oþola : a þe=r : rini : uþole : a=uk : i(a)luns : moþ : sittu : ald=ri : sop þu : ald=r(i) -
ek sendi {} þér, {} ek sé á þér, {} ylgjar {} ergi ok úþola. {} Á þér {} hríni {} úþoli {} ok {} ioluns(?) {} móð. {} Sittu {} aldri, {} sof þú {} aldri …
I send to you, I look at you (= cast on you with the evil eye): wolfish evil and hatefulness. May unbearable distress and 'ioluns' misery take effect on you. Never shall you sit, never shall you sleep, …

a=nt : mer : sem : sialpre : þer : beirist : rubus : rabus : eþ : arantabus : laus : abus : rosa : ga=ua --
ant {} mér {} sem {} sjalfri {} þér. {} Beirist(?) {} rubus {} rabus {} et {} arantabus {} laus {} abus {} rosa {} gaua …
(that you) love me as yourself. [Latinate magical words] and [magical words] …

== Translation ==
=== Interpretation of McKinnell, Simek, Düwel and Hall ===
As normalised and edited by McKinnell, Simek and Düwel, and 'somewhat tentatively' translated by Hall, the charm reads:

Edited text
§A Ríst ek bótrúnar,
ríst ek bjargrúnar,
einfalt við álfum,
tvífalt við tröllum,
þrífalt við þursum ...

§B við inni skœðu
skag-valkyrju,
svá at ei megi
þó at æ vili
lævís kona
lífi þínu ...

§C Ek sendi þér,
ek sé á þér
ylgjar ergi ok óþola.
Á þér renni óþoli
ok ‘ioluns’ móð.
Sittu aldri,
sof þu aldri ...

§D ant mér sem sjalfri þér.

Possible translation
I carve remedy-runes,
I carve protection runes,
once over by álfar,
twice over by trõll (‘?magic-workers, trolls’)
thrice over by þursar (‘?magic-workers, giants’) ...

by the harmful
‘?skag’-valkyrja,
so that you may have no power of action
though you always want,
?crafty woman,
in your life ...

I send to you,
I chant on you
a she-wolf’s lust and restlessness.
May restlessness come over you
and a jǫtunn’s fury (reading iotuns).
Never sit,
never sleep. ...

love me as you love yourself.

== Theories ==
In the view of McKinnell, Simek and Düwel,

it is by no means certain that the inscriptions on all four sides of this stick belong to the same charm. A and B look like part of a protective charm against demons, while C and D seem to be love-magic of the most forbidden kind. However, it remains possible that they represent two contrary aspects of the same spell – a blessing if the woman gives her love to the carver combined with a curse if she refuses it.

They point out that the addressee of side D is a woman, on account of the feminine form sjalfri.

=== Parallels ===
It has been noted that the inscription has close parallels to magic charms found in eddic poetry, especially verse 36 of the poem Skírnismál. According to Finnur Jónsson's 1932 edition of the poem and Carolyne Larrington's 2014 translation (with the line breaks adjusted to match the original):

Þurs rístk þér
ok þría stafi,
ęrgi ok œði ok óþola,
svá ek þat af ríst
sem ek þat á ręist,
ef gęrvask þarfar þess.

“Ogre” I carve for you
and three runes. (Note: Larrington's footnote: [R]unes were the pre-Christian writing system in Scandinavia. Each rune represented both a sound (e.g. ‘h’) and a concept (e.g. ‘hail’ for the ‘h’ rune); they could be used for magical purposes, both for good and evil. See the Lay of Sigrdrifa, vv. 6–13. The first rune ‘ogre’ (þurs) is normally called ‘thorn’, but þurs is given as the name of this rune in the Norwegian Rune Poem, v. 3.)
lewdness and frenzy and unbearable desire;
I can carve that off,
as I carved that on,
if there is need of this.

== Images ==
There is a photograph of a detail of the stave in Aslak Liestøl, ‘Runer frå Bryggen’, Viking: Tidsskrift for norrøn arkeologi, 27 (1964), 5–53, reproduced in Stephen A. Mitchell, ‘Anaphrodisiac Charms in the Nordic Middle Ages: Impotence, Infertility and Magic’, Norveg, 41 (1998), 19-42 (p. 29).

=== Gallery ===
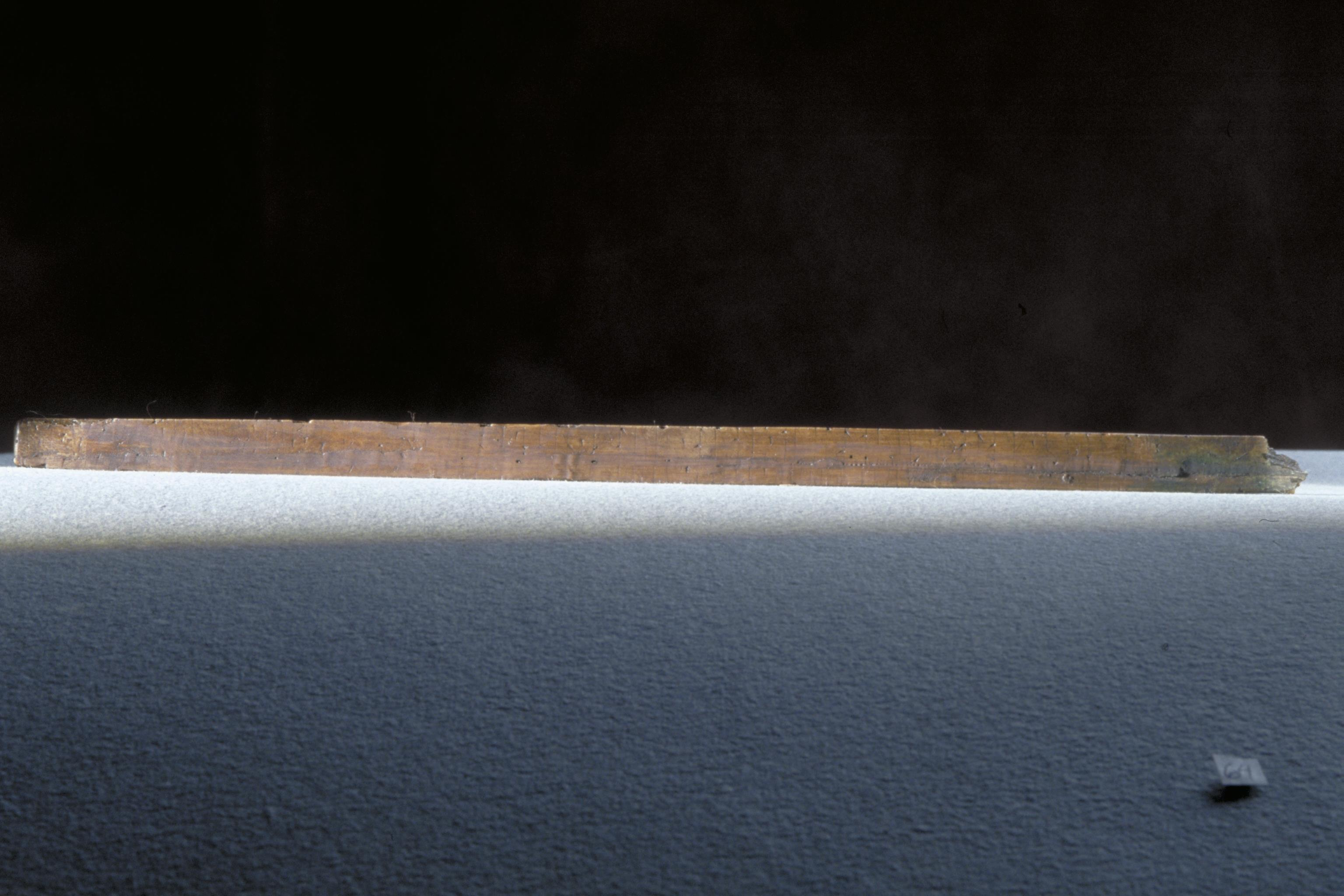
Side A, starting with rist e=k : bot:runa=r :.

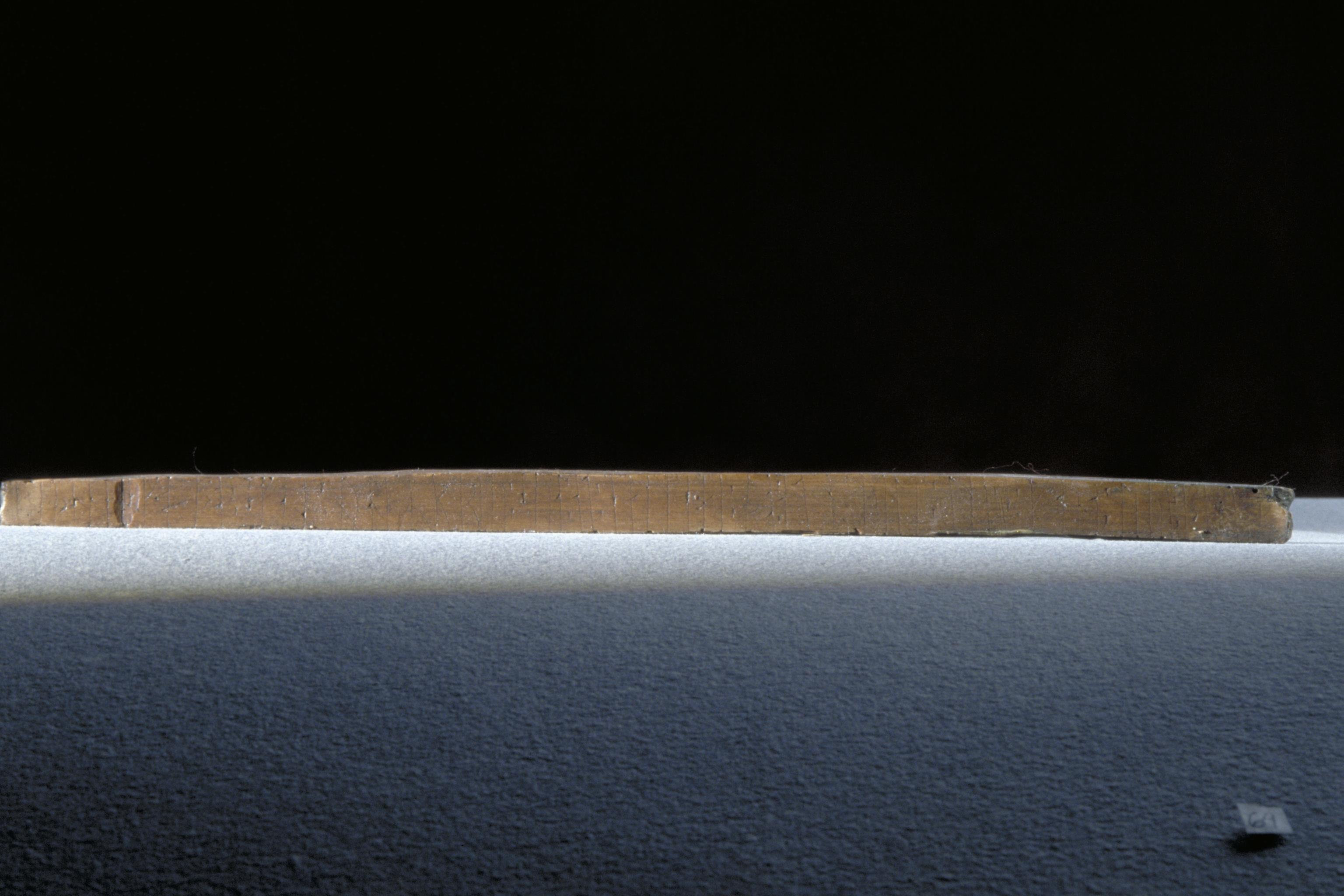
Side B, starting with uiþ e=nne :.

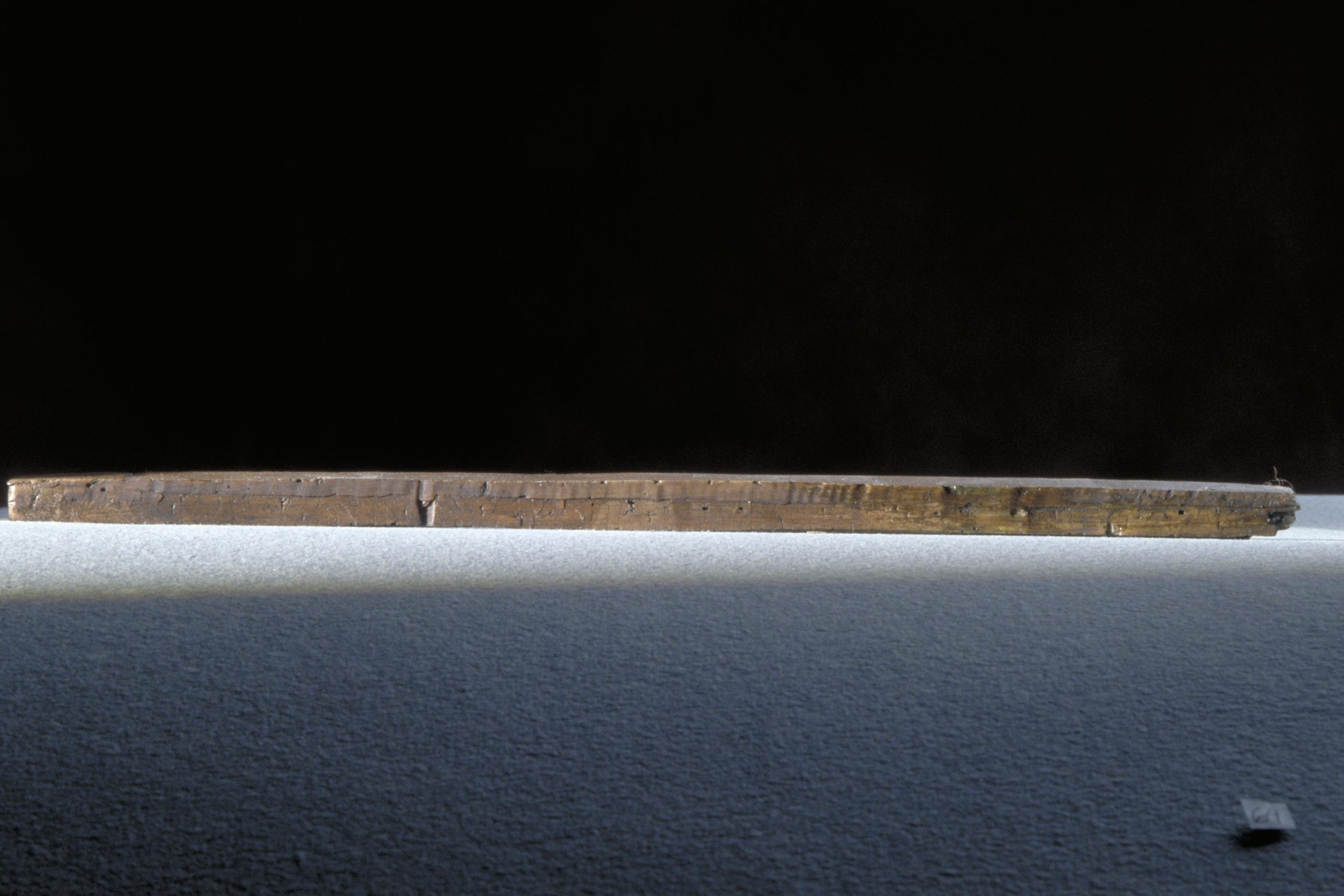
Side C, starting with e=k sende=r :.

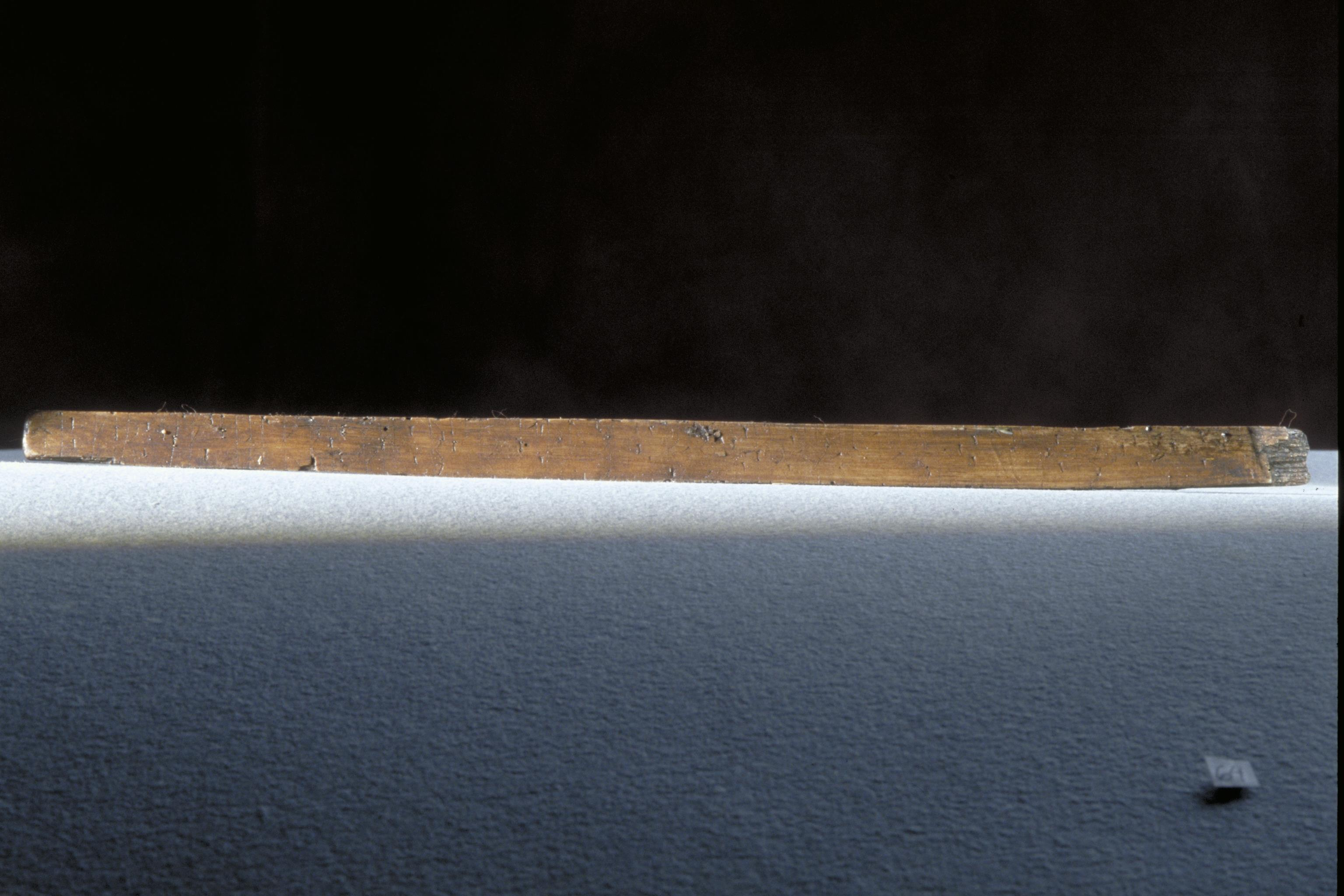
Side D, starting with a=nt : mer :.
