= Magnús Jónsson =

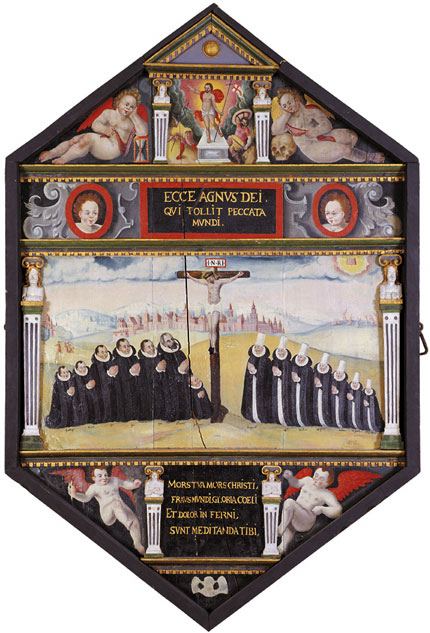
This contemporary painting of Magnús and his family shows them by the crucifixion of Christ.

Magnús Jónsson or Magnús prúði (c. 1530 – 1591) was an Icelandic official and poet.

He was born to a well-off family and received his education in Iceland and Germany, probably Hamburg. Given his career, the curriculum must have included jurisprudence.

After a period as a farmer and landbroker, he held office as sýslumaður, or chief administrator in two counties in Iceland, first Þingeyjaþingssýsla and later Ísafjarðarsýsla, both now defunct as administrative units. He was a famous man in his time, but what has preserved his name for posterity are his writings or, to be specific, the first part of Pontus rímur, a rímur cycle about a Spanish prince. Pontus rímur are among the better ones of the genre and are based, as many of the rímur were, on a French romance transmitted to Iceland through a German translation.

Rímur are not widely read today, but Pontus rímur have secured themselves a special place in Icelandic literature by being a recurring theme in Íslandsklukkan by Halldór Laxness, where the protagonist of the story invariably alleviates boredom by chanting Pontus rímur the Elder. There are no such rímur, but since Pontus rímur have three authors, it is difficult to resist seeing it as a reference to the first part, composed by Magnús.

His nickname, prúði, can be variously interpreted as elegant or wise.

Of his eleven surviving children, Ari Magnússon is of particular note, being the man responsible for the last massacre in Icelandic history, the so-called Spánverjavígin of 1615.
