= Sigurður Breiðfjörð =

Icelandic poet

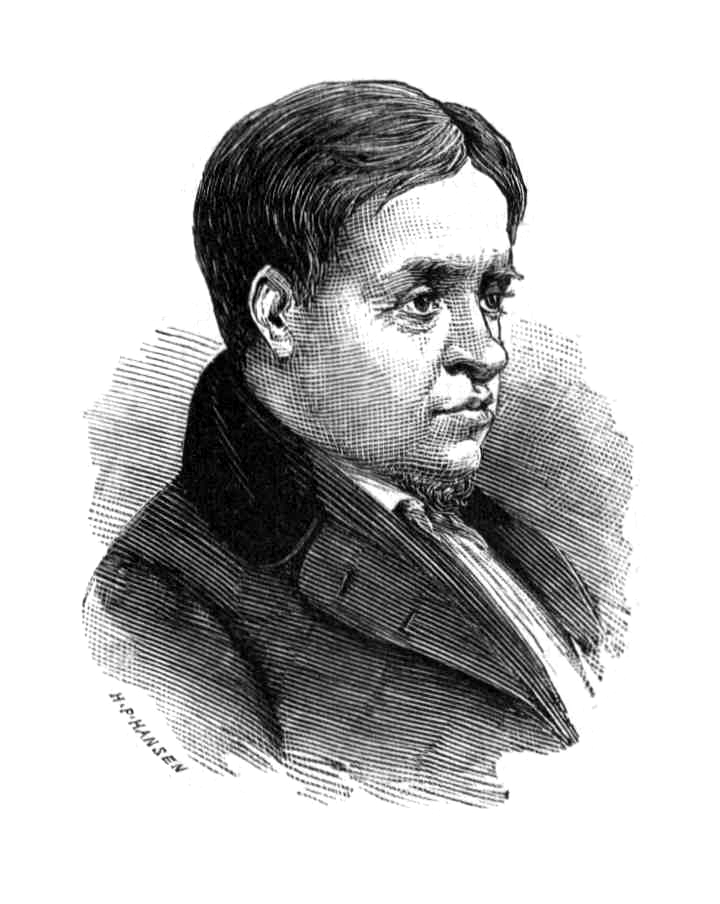
No pictures were made of Sigurður while he was alive but after his death Helgi Sigurðsson á Melum made a pencil drawing of him from memory.

Sigurður Breiðfjörð (4 March 1798 – 1846) was an Icelandic poet. He learned cooperage for four years in Copenhagen and worked as a cooper in Iceland and Greenland. He was a prolific and popular traditional poet, known for his rímur cycles. Núma rímur is his best-known work.

Extract from Núma rímur
