= Lokrur =

Icelandic rhyme

Lokrur is an Icelandic mythological rímur cycle dated to c. 1400. It narrates the journey of the god Thor to Útgarða-Loki, a myth also preserved in Snorri Sturluson's 13th-century Prose Edda part Gylfaginning. Compared with the version in Gylfaginning, the Lokrur version is often more detailed, with fleshed-out descriptions where Gylfaginning has an understated and terse text. The cycle consists of four rímur, the first in stafhent and the rest in ferskeytt meter. The rímur are preserved in only one 16th-century manuscript, AM 604 4to, known as Staðarhólsbók rímna.

== Synopsis ==
=== First ríma ===
The first verse of the first ríma addresses a woman and asks her to listen to the tale. The ríma then introduces the gods Odin, Thor and Loki (verses 2-5). The story starts with Thor asking Loki for his aid in meeting his namesake Útgarða-Loki (v. 6-7). Loki is reluctant, warning Thor that Útgarða-Loki is a fearsome troll (v. 8). Thor tells Loki that he will rescue him if he gets into any trouble and orders him to get ready (v. 9). Thor takes his hammer and his two goats and the journey starts (v. 10).

After travelling a long distance, Thor and Loki come upon a small house with a man standing outside, offering them lodgings (v. 11-12). The farmer has two children, Þjálfi and Röskva (v. 13). Þjálfi and Thor go into the hall to talk while Loki slaughters the goats and prepares the food, which Thor then offers to the people (v. 14-15). Thor and the others eat vigorously while Þjálfi breaks one of the legs to get to the marrow (v. 15-16). The next day Thor resurrects the goats with his hammer and finds that one of them has a damaged leg (17-20). Thor becomes angry, but the farmer offers him reconciliation (v. 21-23). Thor asks for Þjálfi and Röskva as servants and the farmer agrees, both of them happy about the deal (v. 24-26).

Thor leaves his goats with the farmer and goes forward on foot with his companions, walking until night falls (v. 27-28). They find a hall in a forest, large and skilfully made, with a strong roof and broad doors. It is decorated with gold (v. 29-30). They enter the hall and go to sleep (v. 30-31).

=== Second ríma ===
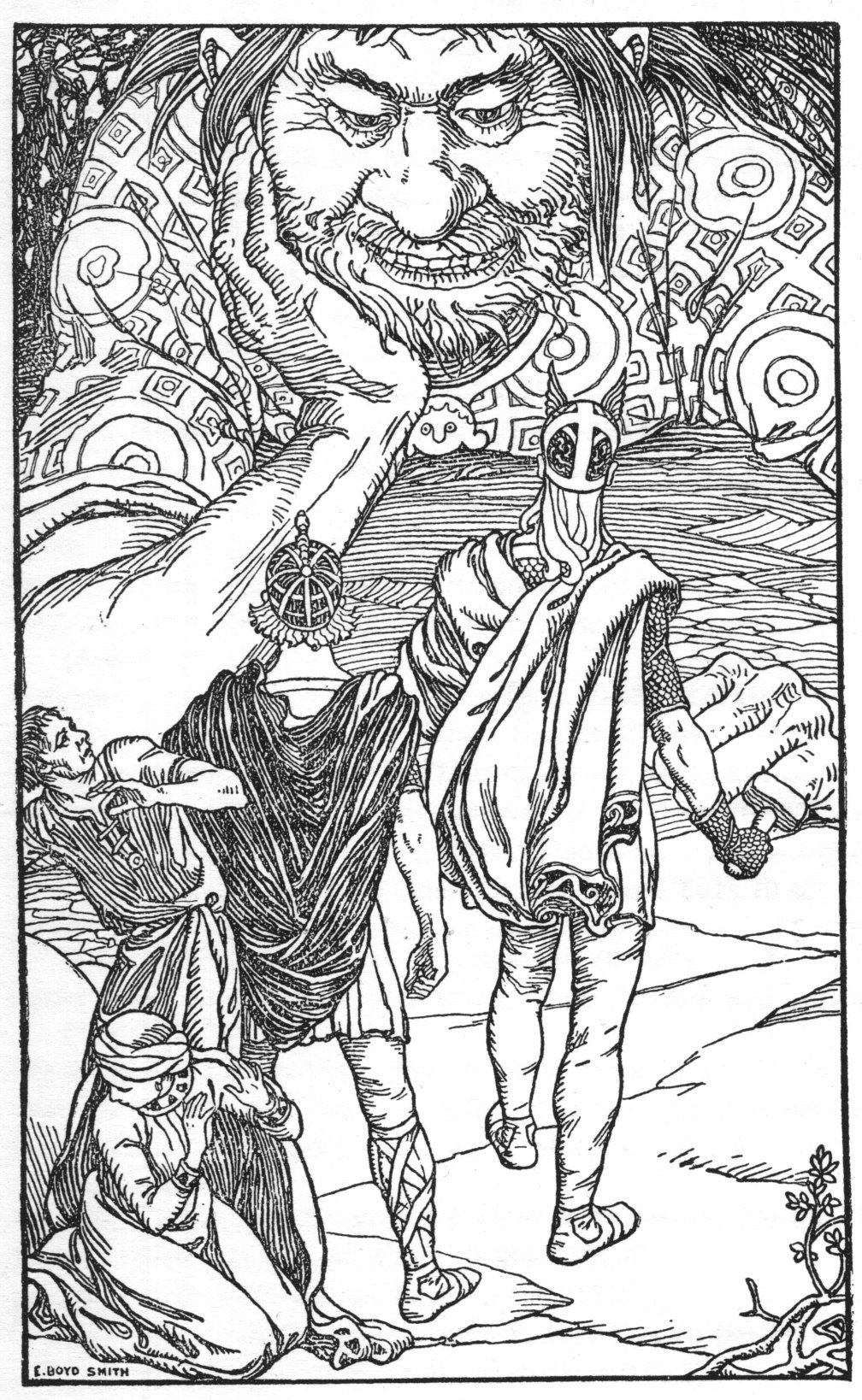
"I am the giant Skrymir" (1902) by Elmer Boyd Smith. Thor and his companions meet Skrímnir.

As Thor and his companions fall asleep a strong wind starts shaking the building and the forest (v. 3-4). They get dressed again and find a small house in the middle of the hall (v. 5). Thor sits in the doorway while his companions go inside (v. 6). The next morning Thor goes outside and finds an enormous giant, described at length, sleeping by an oak, his snoring shaking the earth (v. 7-16). Thor grabs his hammer, intending to kill the giant, but just then he wakes up and startles Thor (v. 16-17). The giant sits up and heartily greets Thor and his companions (v. 18). Thor asks the giant for his name (v. 19). He tells them that he is Skrímnir and asks Thor where he is going (v. 20). Thor replies that he wants to meet the king of Útgarðar (v. 21).

Skrímnir explains to Thor and his companions that the house they spent the night in was actually his glove and tells them they are too weak to have any business visiting Útgarða-Loki, but that he is still willing to help them get there (v. 22-26). Thor accepts and the giant ties all their provisions up in one bag (v. 27). Skrímnir tells them the right way and they follow him through a forest until nightfall (v. 28-30). Skrímnir selects a place for them to stay during the night and tells the others to eat while he goes and lies down (v. 30-31). Thor is unable to untie the bag with the provisions and becomes angry (v. 32-34). He throws Mjöllnir at the snoring giant and hits him in the head (v. 34-35). The giant wakes up and asks if some rubbish from a tree has fallen on him and whether Thor and his companions are full (v. 36-37). Thor tells him that they have eaten and asks him to go to sleep again (v. 38). The giant falls asleep and Thor makes another attempt at him with his hammer, again merely waking him up (v. 39-41). As day breaks, Thor makes a third attempt but to no avail (v. 42-44).

Skrímnir tells them that they are now close to Útgarða-Loki's fortress and tells them the way to go, while he himself goes north (v. 45-47). Thor and his companions now come to a great and fair fortress (v. 48). The ríma ends with a traditional reference to poetry as Odin's drink (v. 49).

=== Third ríma ===
As Thor and his companions approach Útgarða-Loki's fortress they face a strong locked fortress gate (v. 3-6). Unable to open it, they manage to slip through the grating between the bars (v. 7). They go into the hall and Thor greets the king (v. 8-11). Útgarða-Loki welcomes them and asks them where they come from, and whether they excel at any game or sport (v. 11-14).

Loki offers to compete in eating and an opponent, Logi, is assigned to him (v. 15-16). They both eat meat ferociously, but Logi also swallows the knives and the bones and attempts to bite Loki (v. 17-20). Loki is deemed the loser and Útgarða-Loki asks for a better contestant (v. 21). Þjálfi offers to compete in running and suffers a humiliating defeat against Hugi (v. 22-27).

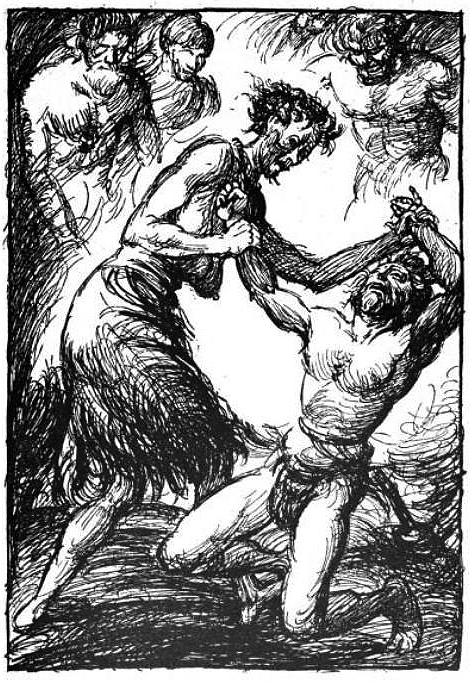
Thor and the old woman wrestle, Robert Engels (1919).

Thor now wants to compete in drinking, and Útgarða-Loki has a horn carried into the hall (v. 28-30). Útgarða-Loki says that the custom is to empty the horn in one go, but Thor drinks from it three times with little success (v. 31-36). Útgarða-Loki then asks Thor to lift his cat from the ground, but despite great effort, Thor can only get one of the cat's feet off the ground (v. 37-41). Útgarða-Loki asks him to get back into his seat and tells him that he has been greatly humiliated (v. 41-44).

=== Fourth ríma ===
Thor now offers to wrestle anyone who will challenge him (v. 2). Útgarða-Loki says he has a mother who once knew how to wrestle, though she is not in good health anymore (v. 3). The woman arrives, large and old, and starts wrestling with Thor (v. 4-5). Thor cannot resist her and falls to his knee (v. 5-8). The woman goes away, but Thor says he wants to go home to Ásgarðr (v. 9).

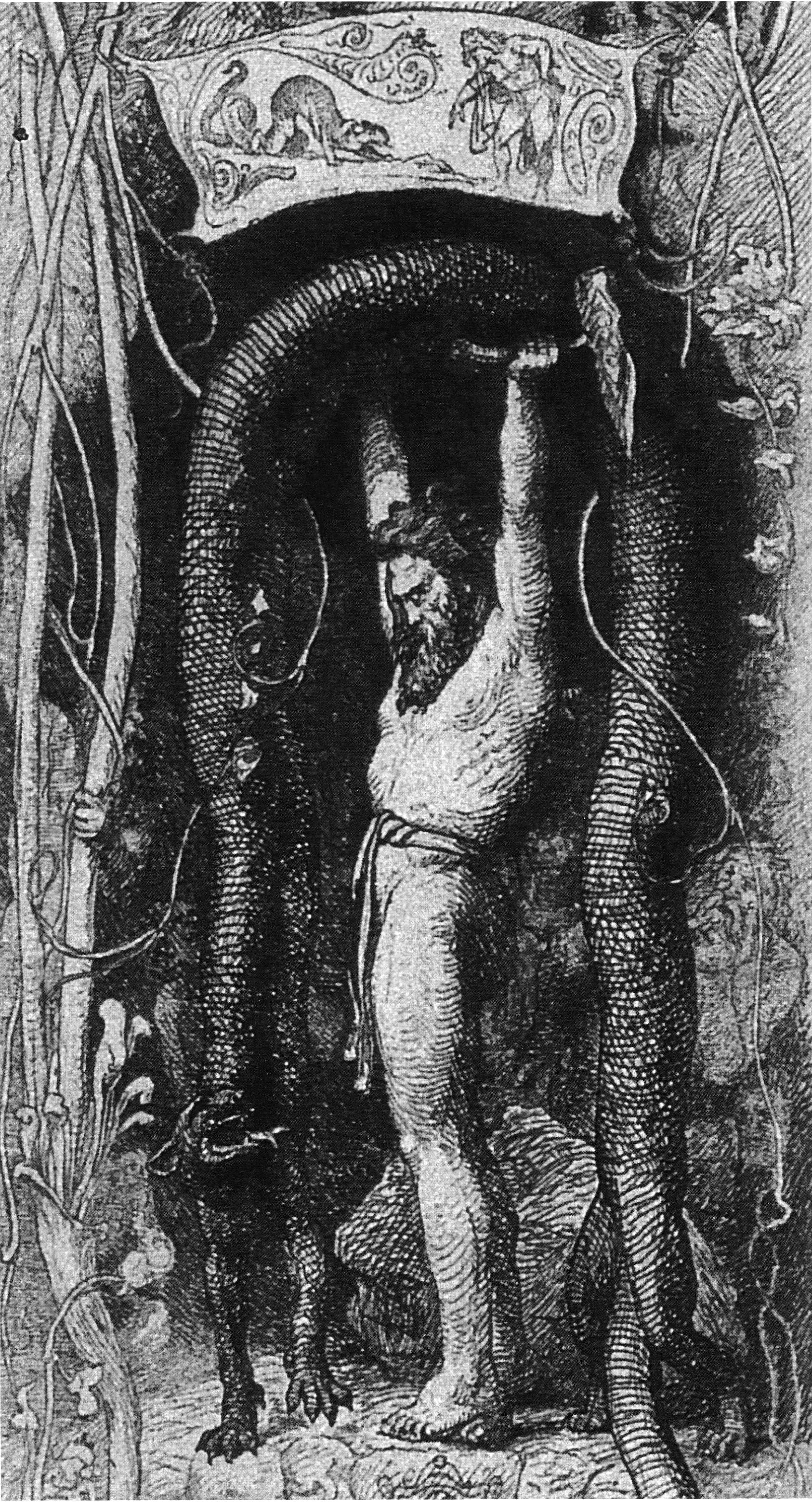
Thor lifts the cat as a challenge (Lorenz Frølich).

Útgarða-Loki says he will lead him away from the fortress and then explains to him that he has deceived him (v. 10-11). A cryptic verse explains that the bag of provisions was sealed with trickery (v. 12). When Thor threw his hammer at Skrímnir, revealed to be the same person as Útgarða-Loki, the blow was blocked by a mountain or it would have killed him (v. 13). Loki lost the eating contest to fire (v. 14). The drinking horn had its end out in the sea and Thor's drinking from it has resulted in the tides (v. 15-16). The cat which Thor tried to lift was actually Miðgarðsormr and the woman he wrestled was Elli, old age (v. 17-18). Útgarða-Loki curses the Æsir and disappears (v. 19-20). The last verse of the cycle gives it the name Lokrur (v. 21).
