= Schreiben eines reisenden Juden aus der Vorzeit =

German-language pseudo-history featuring Jesus of Nazareth

Schreiben eines reisenden Juden aus der Vorzeit (a letter from a certain travelling Jew in ancient times) is a German-language pseudo-history featuring Jesus of Nazareth, written by Johann Heinrich Jung-Stilling, perhaps first published in the Taschenbuch für Freunde des Christenthums, 3 (1807), 126-60. It appeared again soon after in Stilling's 1814 Erzählungen. The text circulated widely in chapbooks in translation into other Germanic languages.

== Summary ==
The text purports to be a letter from a travelling Jew to his rabbi, Aaron, written during the life of Jesus of Nazareth. The traveller meets various characters from the Gospels and is an eyewitness to a number of Jesus's miracles and crucifixion. He enthuses about Jesus and his teachings.

== Translations ==
=== Dutch ===
A complete translation of Stilling's Erzählungen, including Schreiben eines reisenden Juden aus der Vorzeit, was published in Dutch in 1816.

=== Danish and Norwegian ===
The Danish text was printed as Et brev fra en reisende Jøde i Fortiden, da Christus omvandrede her paa Jorden, i hvilket han underretter sin Mester i Nederlandene om sin inderlige Længsel, samt om de vigtigste Tildragelser paa hans Reiser, og skildrer sin Glæde over at have seet og talt med Messias, sammenlignet med det hele sammentagne Guds Ord. Efter et gammelt Manuskript ('a letter from a travelling Jew in ancient times, when Christ wandered here on the Earth, in which he informs his master in the Netherlands about his inner yearning, along with the principal incidents of his journeys, and describes his joy at having seen and talked with the Messiah, as compared with the whole, collected Word of God. According to an old manuscript') in Copenhagen by Ditlewsen in 1833. A second edition was published by the same press in 1850.

A reprint of the Danish text was published in Stavanger in 1874 by S. Asbjørnsen.

=== Swedish ===
A Swedish translation was printed as En resande Judes Bref från forntiden. Öfwersättning ('a travelling Jew's letter from ancient times. A translation'; Linköping, 1836), followed by an 1844 edition from Ekesjö, printed by A. Nilsson, entitled Ett märkwärdigt Bref om Jesus af Nazareth, skrifwet af en resande Jude till en af hans wänner, i den tid Frälsaren wandrade i Judiska landet till menniskoslägtets omwändelse ('a remarkable letter about Jesus of Nazareth, written by a travelling Jew to one of his friends, in the time when the Saviour wandered in the Jewish land for the conversion of the human race). A version with the 1836 title was reprinted in Köping in 1876.

=== Icelandic ===
The Icelandic version survives in manuscript form, usually under the title Sendibréf frá einum reisandi Gyðingi í fornöld.

Place	Call no	Sole text in MS?	MS place (if known)	MS date (if known)	Scribe(s) of MS	Catalogue link (if available)
Reykjavík, National Library of Iceland	ÍB 202 8vo	yes	?Syðra-Laugaland, Öngulstaðahreppur, Eyjafjarðarsýsla	c. 1840	Ólafur Eyjólfsson	https://handrit.is/en/manuscript/view/is/IB08-0202
Reykjavík, National Library of Iceland	ÍB 235 8vo	no		C18-19	various hands	https://handrit.is/is/manuscript/view/IB08-0235
Reykjavík, National Library of Iceland	Lbs 141 8vo	no		c. 1830-40	two hands	
Reykjavík, National Library of Iceland	Lbs 582 8vo	yes		1852	one hand	
Reykjavík, National Library of Iceland	Lbs 981 8vo	yes	?Syðra-Laugaland, Öngulstaðahreppur, Eyjafjarðarsýsla	c. 1840	Ólafur Eyjólfsson	
Reykjavík, National Library of Iceland	Lbs 1391 8vo	no		C19	two hands	
Reykjavík, National Library of Iceland	Lbs 1668 8vo	yes	?Syðra-Laugaland, Öngulstaðahreppur, Eyjafjarðarsýsla	c. 1830	Ólafur Eyjólfsson	
Reykjavík, National Library of Iceland	Lbs 2402 8vo	no	Selland, Hálshreppur, Suður-Þingeyjarsýsla	1852-	Bjarni Jóhannesarson á Sellandi	
Reykjavík, National Library of Iceland	Lbs 3436 8vo	no		C19	various hands	
Leeds, Brotherton Library	General Manuscripts, Special Collections, MS 859	yes	Uppsalir, Öngulsstaðahreppur, Eyjafjarðarsýsla	c. 1830	Ólafur Eyjólfsson	https://explore.library.leeds.ac.uk/special-collections-explore/5835

== See also ==
- Mehnert, Gottfried, 'Juden in Jung-Stillings Leben und literarischem Werk', in Jahrbuch der Hessischen Kirchengeschichtlichen Vereinigung, 64 (2013), 208-36.
