= Ari Eldjárn =

Icelandic stand-up comedian (born 1981)

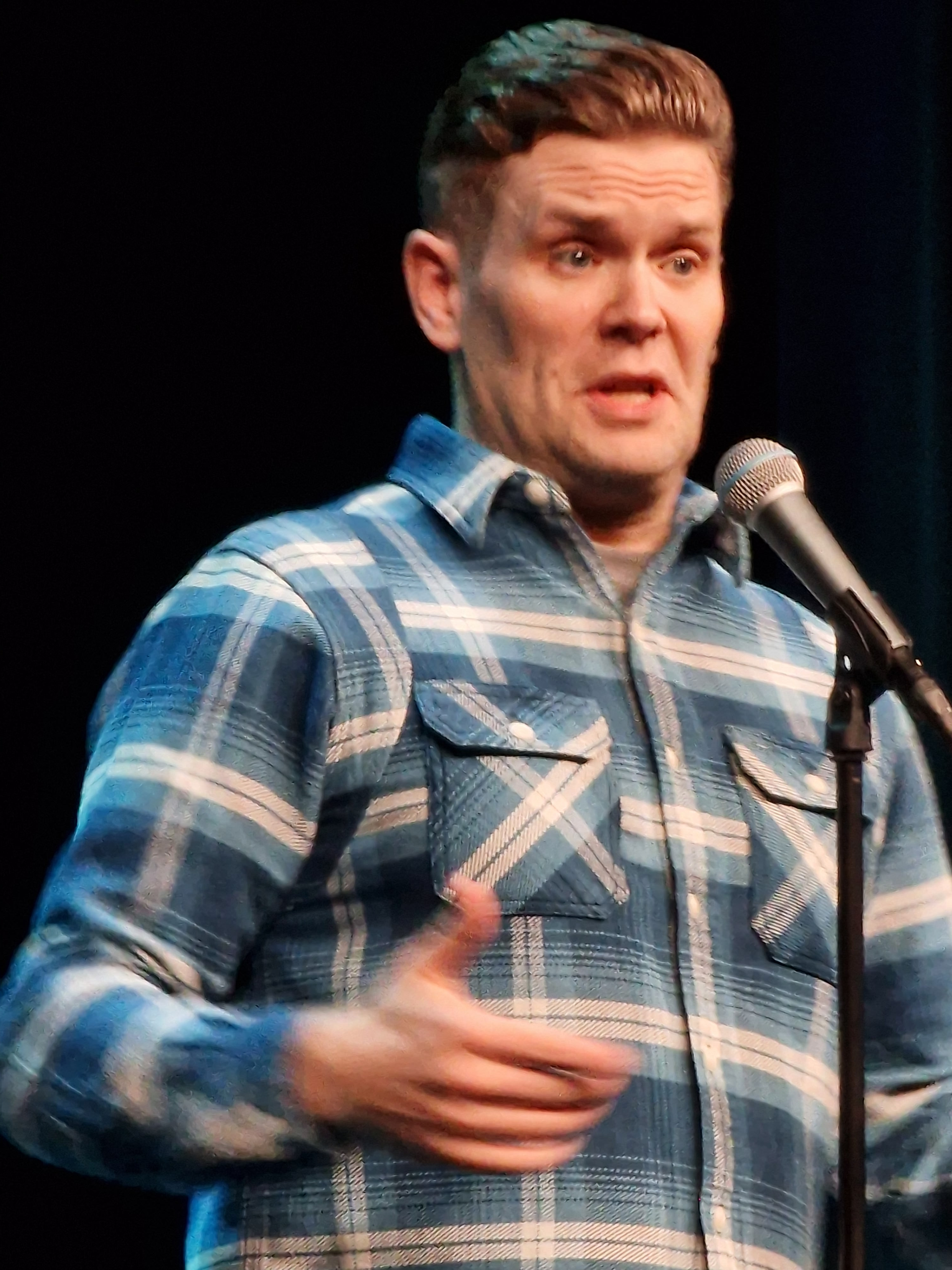
- Born: 5 September 1981 (age 43); Reykjavík, Iceland
- Occupation: Stand-up comedian
- Years active: 2009–present
- Partner: Tinna Brá Baldvinsdóttir
- Parents: Þórarinn Eldjárn (father); Unnur Ólafsdóttir (mother)

Ari Eldjárn ([ˈaːrɪ ˈɛlt.jaurtn]; born 5 September 1981) is an Icelandic stand-up comedian, writer and actor.

== Early life ==
Ari was born in Reykjavík in 1981. His father Þórarinn Eldjárn is a writer. His mother Unnur Ólafsdóttir is a meteorologist, and his paternal grandfather, Kristján Eldjárn, was the third president of Iceland (1968–1980).

== Career ==
Ari began to perform stand-up in May 2009. He wrote for several Icelandic TV programmes, including Mið-Ísland and Hversdagsreglur. He has also appeared in the UK on BBC's Mock the Week. In November 2020, his stand-up show Eagle Fire Iron was released as a vinyl record by Monkey Barrel Records. In December 2020 another of his shows, Pardon My Icelandic, aired on Netflix. In January 2021 Ari was awarded the 2020 Icelandic Optimism Award by President Guðni Th. Jóhannesson.
