= Þórarinn Eldjárn =

Icelandic writer

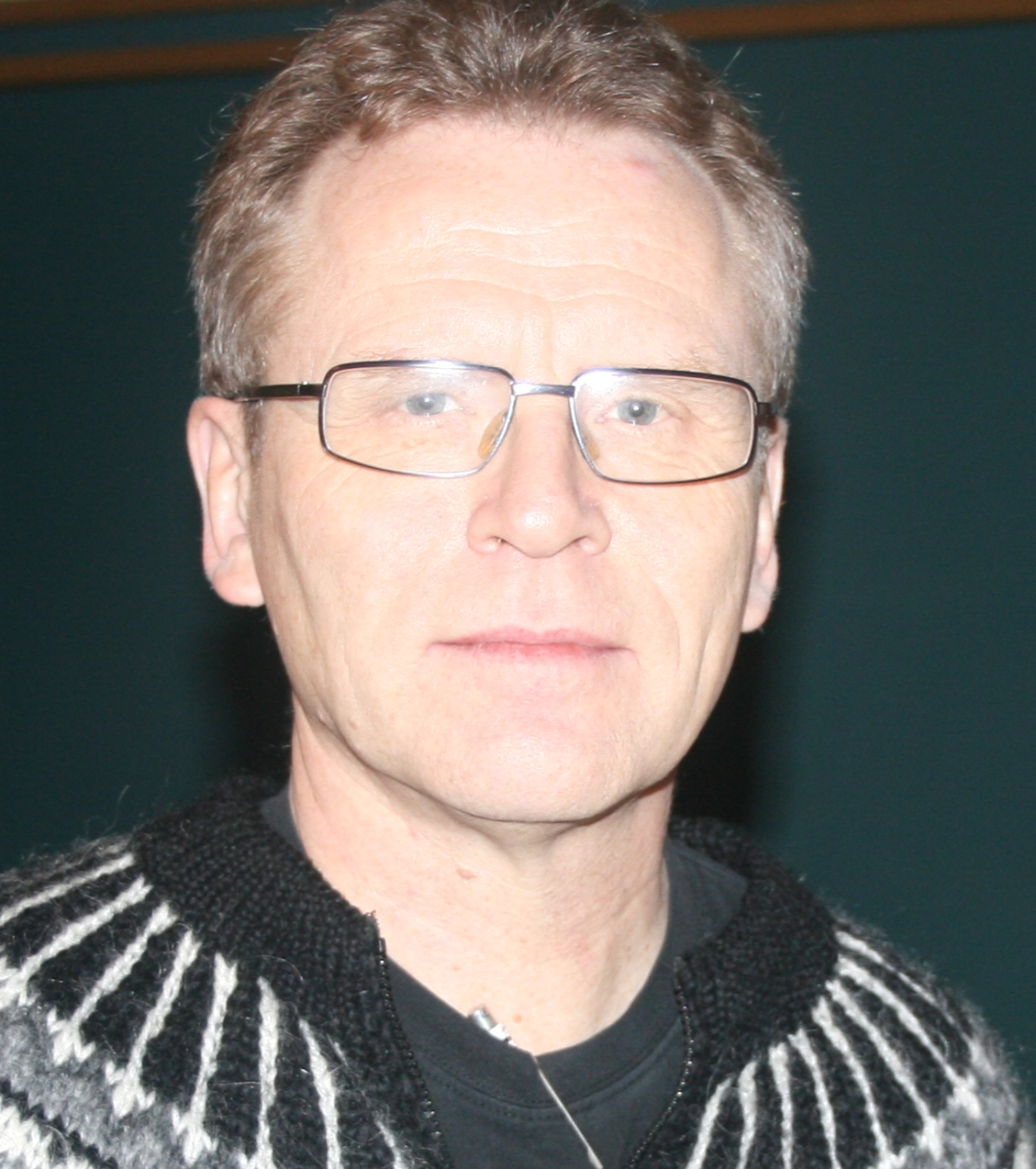
- Born: 22 August 1949; Reykjavík
- Occupations: Poet, translator, writer, children's writer

Þórarinn Eldjárn (born 22 August 1949) is an Icelandic writer, particularly well known in Iceland for his humorous poetry books for children.

== Life and work ==
Þórarinn is the son of Kristján Eldjárn, the third president of Iceland (in office from 1968 to 1980).

He studied at Lund University and the University of Iceland. He has written numerous poems, stories, and novels. He has also translated several books into Icelandic, including Alice in Wonderland. In addition, he has produced a number of children's poetry books, seemingly somewhat inspired by the works of Dr. Seuss, with illustrations by his sister.

His best-known work internationally is the novel Brotahöfuð ("The Blue Tower"), which was nominated for an International Dublin Literary Award in 2001. Locally he is well known and respected for his short stories (most often offering humorous social satire), and his equally humorous and witty poetry, such as his "Disney Rhymes" (1974) - The Walt Disney Story presented as an epic tale in the rímur fashion.

In 2008, the Icelandic publishing house Vaka-Helgafell, released the entire collection of his poetry which instantly became a best seller.

In 2025, the Icelandic Parliament awarded him an honorary lifetime artist pension (Heiðurslaun listamanna).

Þórarinn has five sons: Kristján Eldjárn guitarist (1972–2002), Ólafur Eldjárn (1975–1998), Úlfur Eldjárn composer, Ari Eldjárn comedian and Halldór Eldjárn of the band Sykur.
