= Ferskeytt =

Icelandic stanzaic poetic form

Ferskeytt (literally 'four-cornered') is an Icelandic stanzaic poetic form. It is a kind of quatrain, and probably first attested in fourteenth-century rímur such as Ólafs ríma Haraldssonar. It remains one of the dominant metrical forms in Icelandic versifying to this day.

Ferskeytt comprises odd-numbered, basically trochaic lines with four stresses in the pattern / x / x / x /, alternating with even-numbered trochaic lines with three stresses in the pattern / x / x / x. In each line, one unstressed syllable may be replaced with two unstressed syllables. Stanzas are normally of four lines, and rhyme aBaB. In the first line, two heavily stressed syllables alliterate with the first heavily stressed syllable of the second line, and so on in the usual alliterative pattern of Germanic alliterative verse.

An example of the form is this verse by Jónas Hallgrímsson, with a translation into the same metre by Dick Ringler. Alliteration is emboldened and rhyme is italicised:

Hóla bítur hörkubál,
hrafnar éta gorið,
tittlingarnir týna sál,
tarna' er ljóta vorið!

Hillsides raked by raging frost,
ravens eating offal,
buntings giving up the ghost —
God, this spring is awful!

There are many variations on ferskeytt, whose common principle is that they are quatrains with some kind of alternate rhyme. A poem in this metre is called a ferskeytla ('four-cornered [poem]'). Metres which share these properties belong to the ferskeytluætt ('ferskeytla-family').
