= Mansöngr =

Form of Norse poetry

A mansǫngr (literally 'maiden-song'; plural mansǫngvar; modern Icelandic mansöngur, plural mansöngvar) is a form of Norse poetry. In scholarly usage the term has often been applied to medieval skaldic love-poetry; and it is used of lyric openings to rímur throughout the Icelandic literary tradition.

== In high-medieval Iceland ==
Skaldic love-poetry and erotic poems in Old Norse-Icelandic are often characterised in modern scholarship as mansöngvar. However, Edith Marold and Bjarni Einarsson have argued that the term mansöngr has been over-used in medieval scholarship, being applied to love-poems which we have no evidence were actually viewed as mansöngvar. Many medieval references to mansöngvar are not accompanied by the poem in question, and the boundaries of the genre are thus disputed. The Icelandic Homily Book (from c. 1200) mentions mansöngr in connection with the music of David and Solomon.

=== In Icelandic sagas ===
In Egils saga, the poet Egill Skallagrímsson recites a poem about a woman to his friend Arinbjörn. Arinbjörn asks Egill for whom he has composed this mansöngr and Egill recites another poem before revealing that the subject of both is Arinbjörn's kinswoman Ásgerðr, the widow of Egill's brother Þórólfr (Thorolf). Egill requests Arinbjörn's help in arranging his marriage with Ásgerðr, and the mansöngvar are thus a prelude to an open declaration of love and a marriage petition.

Hallfreðr vandræðaskáld's poems to Kolfinna Ávaldadóttir are also described as mansöngvar in Hallfreðar saga, but the saga depicts Hallfreðr as resisting attempts to organise Kolfinna's marriage to both himself and other men. The saga portrays Hallfreðr's erotic poetry about Kolfinna and his libellous verses on Kolfinna's husband, Grís, as destructive in nature—objectifying Kolfinna while inciting her family to violence. Only through his relationship with his King Ólafr Tryggvason (his eventual godfather) and his spiritual poems does Hallfreðr find redemption and maturity and eventually express regret for the sorrow he has caused Kolfinna.

One of the oldest saga manuscripts to preserve a reference to the genre is DG 8 from c. 1225–1250 in the hagiographical saga Óláfs saga helga. According to the saga, the Icelandic skald Óttarr svarti composed a mansǫngsdrápa about Queen Ástríðr of Norway when they were both in the court of her father, the King of Sweden. This drápa provoked the wrath of her husband, King Ólafr Helgason, but when Óttarr travelled to Norway he prudently enlisted the help of his uncle and skald Sigvatr Þórðarson to gain an audience with the Norwegian king and redeem himself with the poem Hǫfuðlausn, which praises the merits of King Ólafr rather than the beauty of his wife.

=== In Icelandic law ===
The composing of mansöngvar for or about women is explicitly prohibited by the medieval Icelandic law-code Grágás, 'in the younger additions to Konungsbók (GKS 1157 fol) and Staðarhólsbók (AM 334 fol), where it is inserted into a passage bearing the title 'vm scaldscap' ('on poetry'), an exhaustive treatment of the different kinds of poetry and the various punishments for them'. But there is no clear explanation of what a mansöngr is. In the Konungsbók version, §238, the text reads

Ef maðr yrkir mansöng vm cono oc varðar scog gang. Kona a söc ef hon er xx. eða ellre. ef hon vill eigi søkia láta. oc a lavg raðande hennar sökena.

If a man composes mansǫngr about a woman he suffers full outlawry. The woman has to bring the case if she is twenty or older. If she will not have it prosecuted, then her legal administrator has to bring the case.

== In rímur ==
In Icelandic rímur, mansöngur is the term used for the (optional) opening section of each ríma poem within the larger epic. The mansöngur typically shares a metre with the ríma it prefaces but is lyric poetry rather than narrative and the poet often speaks in the first person, addressing the audience directly. The mansöngur is often addressed to a woman but known as mansöngr even when it isn't. Pétur Húni Björnsson has argued that scholars should instead use the terms "extra-narrative material", "prologues" and "epilogues" when not speaking specifically of love-poetry. The mansöngur may or may not relate to the main narrative of the rímur: some poets use the mansöngur to comment on the events of the story as they unfold or explore specific narrative themes, but others treat the mansöngur as a 'break from the action'.

The earliest rímur lack mansöngvar. In later rímur, the author (usually male) would compose poetry about a woman he had fallen in love with (but who generally is not depicted as reciprocating his feelings). Accordingly, mansöngvar are often sorrowful. At least in pre-Reformation rímur, prologues' structure is usually (1) to talk about poetry, (2) to dedicate the poem to a woman who is the poet's muse, (3) to acknowledge or address the audience, and (4) to return to the theme of poetry. Later, they started to feature other topics, such as love for one's ancestral estate or complaints at how few people appreciate poetry.

One example of the content of a mansöngur is afforded by Craigie's summary of stanzas 1-17 of the third ríma of Skotlands rímur by Einar Guðmundsson, a 17th-century poet. It includes many of the classical features of the mansöngur in rímur: a fair woman is addressed, while the poet laments his inadequacy as a poet and the sorrowful state of the world. The mansöngur is also a platform for personal expression—here, probably, a (veiled) complaint over losing his position as the minister for Staður in Reykjanes in 1635 after accusing two parishioners of sorcery:

Though the ring-decked maiden might wish for a love-song, I have but little poetry from Odin. Only a little scent of the fruit of song he gave me once: I have no need to be grateful for his generosity. Let those rejoice who have been more successful. Friendship is not shown to every man, and I was never good at winning favour of the great. True friendship is rare over all the land; most men look for some advantage and are envious of all others who get wealth or fame. Seek not, then, to be praised by the world: disgrace and loss may follow. He that sees in secret will reward you, and He will come one day to sit in judgement. May I be able to see Him with joy, though my works are not so good as they might be. I have not the mansöngs to speak about the fair maid, but I must try to give her the third ballad now!

== In Norway ==
Among the medieval inscriptions found at Bryggen in the Norwegian city of Bergen, there are preserved examples of mansǫngskvæði (mansǫngr poems) written in Skaldic meters such as dróttkvætt. In particular, N B145 dates to the first half of the thirteenth century and contains a full dróttkvætt stanza, the first half of which translates thusly:

The ancient breeze of the cliff-goddesses [GIANTESSES > DESIRE] fell to me early with respect to the beautiful, dangerous young pine-tree of the fastened fire of the fish expanse [SEA > GOLD > (beautiful, dangerous, young) WOMAN].

Simplified, this means:

Desire for the beautiful, dangerous young woman overcame me a long time ago.

== See also ==
- Old Norse poetry
