= Rímur =

Form of Icelandic epic poetry

In Icelandic literature, a ríma (IPA: [ˈriːma], literally "a rhyme", pl. rímur, [ˈriːmʏr̥]) is an epic poem written in any of the so-called rímnahættir ([ˈrimnaˌhaihtɪr̥], "rímur meters"). They are rhymed, they alliterate and consist of two to four lines per stanza. The plural, rímur, is either used as an ordinary plural, denoting any two or more rímur, but is also used for more expansive works, containing more than one ríma as a whole. Thus Ólafs ríma Haraldssonar denotes an epic about Ólafr Haraldsson in one ríma, while Sigurður Breiðfjörð's Núma rímur are a multi-part epic on Numa Pompilius.

== Form ==
Rímur, as the name suggests, rhyme, but like older Germanic alliterative verse, they also contain structural alliteration. They are stanzaic; the stanzas normally have four lines. There are hundreds of ríma metres: Sveinbjörn Beinteinsson counts 450 variations in his Háttatal. But they can be grouped in approximately ten "families". The most common metre is ferskeytt.

Ríma-poetry inherited kennings, heiti and other ornate features of medieval Icelandic poetic diction from skaldic verse. The language of rímur is likewise influenced by the rhetorical devices associated with late medieval geblümter Stil ('flowery style').

When they are long — as they usually are — rímur usually comprise several distinct sections, each being called a ríma, and each usually in a different metre. After the earliest rímur, it became conventional to begin each ríma in a cycle with a mansöngr, a lyric address, traditionally to or about a woman whom the poet supposedly loves, usually in vain.

== History ==
The earliest rímur date from the early to mid-fourteenth century, evolving from eddaic poetry and skaldic poetry with influences from Continental epic poems. Óláfs ríma Haraldssonar, preserved in Flateyjarbók, is the ríma attested in the oldest manuscript and is sometimes considered the oldest ríma; the earliest large collection of rímur is in Kollsbók (Wolfenbüttel, Herzog August Bibliothek, Codex Guelferbytanus 42.7 Augusteus quarto), a vellum manuscript dated by Ólafur Halldórsson to 1480–90. Skíðaríma, Bjarkarímur, and Lokrur are other examples of early rímur. The key work on editing rímur focused on medieval examples like these and was undertaken by Finnur Jónsson. Rímur were usually adapted from existing prose sagas, and occasionally comprise the only surviving evidence for those sagas; one example is the fifteenth-century Skáld-Helga rímur.

Rímur were the mainstay of epic poetry in Iceland for centuries: 78 are known from before 1600, 138 from the seventeenth century, 248 from the eighteenth, 505 from the nineteenth and 75 from the twentieth. Most have never been printed and survive only in manuscripts, mostly in the National and University Library of Iceland: about one hundred and thirty popular editions of rímur were printed between 1800 and 1920, but there are more than one thousand nineteenth-century manuscripts containing rímur. Some lost sagas were recomposed based on the corresponding rímur.

In the nineteenth century the poet Jónas Hallgrímsson published an influential critique on a rímur cycle by Sigurður Breiðfjörð and the genre as a whole. At the same time Jónas and other romantic poets were introducing new continental verse forms into Icelandic literature and the popularity of the rímur started to decline. Nevertheless, many of the most popular nineteenth- and twentieth-century Icelandic poets composed rímur, including Bólu-Hjálmar, Sigurður Breiðfjörð, Einar Benediktsson, Steinn Steinarr, Örn Arnarson and Þórarinn Eldjárn. In the late twentieth century Sveinbjörn Beinteinsson was the best known rímur poet.

The twenty-first century has seen something of a revival of rímur in Icelandic popular music. The central figure in this revival has been Steindór Andersen, particularly noted for collaborations with Sigur Rós (leading to the 2001 EP Rímur) and with Hilmar Örn Hilmarsson (leading, for example, to the 2013 album Stafnbúi).

== Critical reception ==
The scholar Sigurður Nordal wrote of the rímur:

Icelandic rímur are probably the most absurd example of literary conservatism that has ever been noted. It can be said that they remain unchanged for five whole centuries although everything around them changes. And although they frequently have little poetic value and sometimes even border on complete tastelessness, they have demonstrated with their tenacity that they satisfy the needs of the nation peculiarly well.

Over the centuries numerous authors would probably have agreed with this statement, since a substantial number of rímur were turned into prose sagas. However, Nordal never denied the importance of rímur as an aspect of the history of literature, and in his lectures specifically emphasised their role in maintaining the continuity of Icelandic literature, a subject close to his heart. He also recognised that among the mass of rímur composed, there were works of art to be found, although he was of the opinion that (according to his published lectures) none of the rímur might be called a "perfect work of art" with the possible exception of Skíðaríma. And he himself occasionally composed a stanza in the rímur metres.

Extract from Núma rímur

== Editions and further reading ==
=== Editions ===
- Colwill, Lee (trans.), Grettis rímur, Apardjón Journal for Scandinavian Studies (2021)
- Colwill Lee and Haukur Þorgeirsson (ed. and trans.), The Bearded Bride: a critical edition of Þrymlur (London: Viking Society for Northern Research, 2020)
- W. A. Craigie (ed.), Icelandic Ballads on the Gowrie Conspiracy (Oxford: Clarendon Press, 1908). [Edition of Einar Guðmundsson's Skotlands rímur.]
- William A. Craigie (ed.), Sýnisbók íslenzkra rímna frá upphafi rímnakveðskapar til loka nítjándu aldar/Specimens of Icelandic Rímur from the Fourteenth to the Nineteenth Century. 3 vols. London: Nelson, 1952.
- Finnur Jónsson (ed.), Fernir forníslenskir rímnaflokkar (Copenhagen, 1896). ["Four Old Icelandic Rímur Cycles": edition of Lokrur, Þrymlur, Griplur and Völsungsrímur.]
- Finnur Jónsson (ed.), Rímnasafn: Samling af de ældste islandske rimer, Samfund til udgivelse af gammel nordisk litteratur, 35, 2 vols (Copenhagen: Møller and Jørgensen, 1905–22). [Edition of the earliest rímur.]

=== Resources ===
- Finnur Jónsson, Ordbog til de af Samfund til Udg. ad Gml. Nord. Litteratur Udgivne Rímur samt til de af Dr. O. Jiriczek Udgivne Bósarimur (Copenhagen: Jørgensen, 1926–28). [Dictionary of early rímur.]
- Finnur Sigmundsson, Rímnatal, Rit Rímnafélagsins, 11, 2 vols (Reykjavík: Rímnafélagið, 1966). [Catalogue of rímur.]
- Ísmús [online Icelandic archive of traditional oral and musical culture]

=== Key studies ===
- Davíð Erlingsson, 'Rímur', Íslensk þjóðmenning VI. Munnmenntir og bókmenning, ed. by Frosti F. Jóhannsson (Reykjavík: Þjóðsaga, 1989), pp. 330–55.
- Hallfreður Örn Eiríksson, 'On Icelandic Rímur: An Orientation', Arv, 31 (1975), 139–150.
- Svend Nielsen, Rímnakveðskapur tíu kvæðamanna: Rannsókn á tilbrigðum, ed. and trans. by Rósa Þorsteinsdóttir (Reykjavík: Stofnun Árna Magnússonar í Íslenskum Fræðum, 2022), ISBN 9789979654636
- Sverrir Tómasson, 'Hlutverk rímna í íslensku samfélagi á síðari hluta miðalda', Ritið, 5.3 (2005), 77–94.
