= Aladár =

- Gender: masculine
- Language: Hungarian
- Name day: February 20

Other names
- Nicknames: Aladárka, Alcsi, Ali, Alika, Alisa, Palcsi

Aladár is a Hungarian male given name of Germanic origin, which developed as a Hungarian adaptation of the German names Aldarik or Aldemar. Its meaning comes from Germanic words: adal or alda means "experienced" or "old," and ric means "powerful" or "famous." The name Aladár, like many other old Hungarian given names, gradually fell out of use by the end of the Middle Ages. Its revival and renewed popularity can be attributed to the 19th-century era of national romanticism, when interest in Hungarian history and culture led to the resurgence of many traditional names.

== In the Hungarian mythology ==
The name became known in Hungarian culture through medieval chronicles and legends about the Huns. According to the legend, Aladár was the son of Attila, King of the Huns, and Ildico, a German princess. After Attila's death, a power struggle arose between Aladár and his brother, Csaba. The conflict allegedly took place near Óbuda, where Aladár, with the help of his German allies, defeated Csaba's forces. However, Aladár himself also perished in the battle. These names, Aladár and Csaba, appear exclusively in the mythological narratives of Hungarian chronicles.

== Popularity ==
The name Aladár is among the less common names. According to data from 1967, only 24 boys were given this name, while during the period between 1983 and 1987, it was chosen 81 times. By the 21st century, the name's popularity had further declined, and in 2000, it no longer appeared among names given more than ten times in a year. In 2006, aggregated statistics ranked it 99th, with 2,341 men using it as their first name and an additional 541 as their second name. By the 2020s, the name no longer featured among the 100 most commonly chosen male names.

== Name days ==
The name has multiple name days throughout the year:

- February 20
- March 11
- April 18
- April 20
- May 26
- June 29

== Fictional characters ==
- Aladár Mézga, in The Mézga Family series
- Aladar, an iguanodon in the film Dinosaur and the video game of the same name

== People ==
- Aladár Andrássy (1827–1903), Hungarian soldier and politician.
- Aladár Árkay (1868–1932), Hungarian architect, craftsman and painter.
- Aladár Aujeszky (1869–1933), Hungarian veterinary pathologist, professor of bacteriology and microbiologist.
- Aladár Donászi (1954–2001), Hungarian robber and serial killer.
- Aladár Gerevich (1910–1991), Hungarian fencer, seven-time Olympic gold medalist.
- Aladar Imre (1898–1937/1938), Romanian trade unionist, communist militant and member-elect of the Romanian Parliament.
- Aladár Körösfői-Kriesch (1863–1920), Hungarian Art Nouveau painter.
- Aladár Paasonen (1898–1974), Austro-Hungarian born Finnish military officer.
- Aladár Pege (1939–2006), Hungarian jazz double bassist.
- Aladár Radó (1882–1914), Hungarian composer of classical music.
- Aladár Virág (born 1983), Hungarian footballer.
- Aladár Zichy (1864–1937), Hungarian politician.
