= Radloff =

Surname

Radloff is a surname. Notable people with the surname include:

- Frank Kenneth Radloff (1916–1995), merchant and political figure in Saskatchewan
- Friedrich Wilhelm Radloff (1837–1918), German-born Russian founder of Turkology, a scientific study of Turkic peoples
- Stan Radloff (1919–2009), former Australian rules footballer
- Toby Radloff (born 1957), former file clerk who appears in Cleveland writer Harvey Pekar's comic book American Splendor
- Wayne Radloff (born 1961), former professional American football offensive lineman

== See also ==
- Toibb v. Radloff, 501 U.S. 157 (1991)
- Radl (disambiguation)
- Rado (disambiguation)
- Roff (disambiguation)
