= Haddingjar =

In Nordic and Germanic legends, two brothers or a reflection of the Hasdingi Vandals

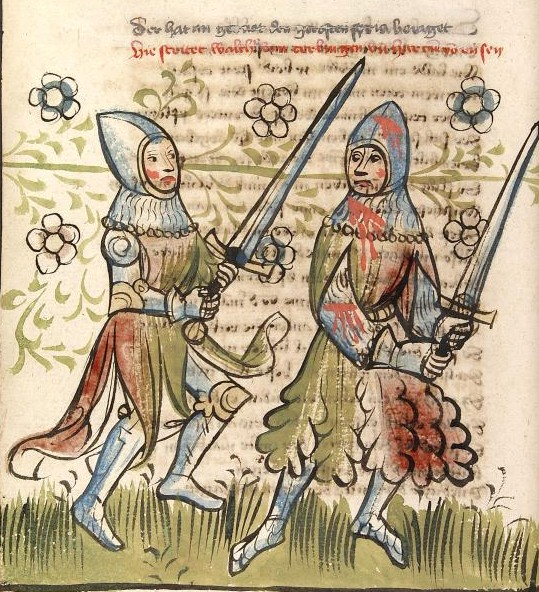
An illustration of Hartung (right), fighting Walther of Kerlingen in the Rosengarten zu Worms chivalric epic (CPG 359 (1418), fol. 40v).

The Haddingjar (Old Norse: [ˈhɑdːeŋɡjɑz̠]) refers on the one hand to Germanic heroic legends about two brothers by this name, and on the other hand to possibly related legends based on the Hasdingi, the royal dynasty of the Vandals. The accounts vary greatly.

They have been identified with the Alci mentioned by Tacitus. According to Tacitus, the Alci were worshiped as gods by cross-dressing priests (male priests dressed in female clothing). These gods were described in the "Roman language" as Castor and Pollux.

== Origins ==
It has been suggested that they were originally two Proto-Germanic legendary heroes by the name *Hazdingōz, meaning the "longhairs", and that they were identical to the Alci mentioned by Tacitus. According to Tacitus, the Alci were worshiped as gods by priests in female clothing:

[...] and the Nahanarvali. Among these last is shown a grove of immemorial sanctity. A priest in female attire has the charge of it. But the deities are described in Roman language as Castor and Pollux. Such, indeed, are the attributes of the divinity, the name being Alcis. They have no images, or, indeed, any vestige of foreign superstition, but it is as brothers and as youths that the deities are worshipped.

Cassius Dio mentioned c. 170 the Astingoi as a noble clan among the Vandals, and the Asdingi reappear, in the 6th century in Jordanes' work as the royal dynasty of the Vandals.

The root appears in Old Icelandic as haddr meaning "woman's hair", and the motivation for the name Haddingjar/Astingoi/Asdingi was probably that men from Germanic royal dynasties sported long hair as a mark of dignity (cf. the "longhaired Merovingians").

== In legend and mythology ==
1. In the Hervarar saga, Gesta Danorum, Orvar-Odd's saga and Lay of Hyndla, there are two Haddingjar among the twelve sons of the berserker Arngrim.
2. Oddly, in Orvar-Odd's saga, after his friend Orvar-Odd had killed these two Haddingjar, Hjalmar mentions in his death song two Haddingjar among his friends back in Sigtuna.
3. In Hversu Noregr byggðist, there is a Hadding Raumsson who was the king of Haddingdalen in Norway. He is succeeded by a son and a grandson by the same name. After his great-grandson Högni, there is a succession of three more generations named Hadding, making six Haddingjar in the same line.
4. The prose section following Helgakviða Hundingsbana II, there is a Helgi Haddingjaskati (Helgi the prince of the Haddingjar, i.e. the Hasdingi of the Vandals) referring to a now lost poem named Káruljóð, which was named after Helgi's beloved, the Valkyrie Kára. This poem survives in an altered form as Hrómundar saga Gripssonar, where Helgi fights in the service of two Swedish kings by the name Haldingr.
5. In the oldest one of the Gudrun lays, the Guðrúnarkviða II, Gudrun says that the potion of oblivion that her mother had given her contained several runes, and among them the "unshorn corn ear of Haddingland", possibly a magic Vandal rune.
6. In Kálfsvísa, in Snorri Sturluson's Skáldskaparmál, it is said that the king of the Haddingjar (the Vandals) rode a horse named Skævað.
7. In Gesta Danorum there is a Haddingus about whom Saxo Grammaticus has many things to tell. He is possibly a memory of the Hasdingi, the royal clan of the Vandals.
8. The original name of the Norwegian valley Hallingdal was Haddingjadalr. Local legends state that Hadding was a king of this valley, and that it was named after him. After him, his sons, the two Haddings, fought over control of the valley. One of them was killed, and was buried in a mound in Gol, still known for sightings of huldufolk.

== Sources ==
- Ohlmarks, Åke. (1982). Fornnordiskt lexikon. Tiden. ISBN 91-550-2511-0
- The article Hadding in Nordisk familjebok (1909)
