= Roff =

Roff may refer to:

== Computing ==
- roff (software), a 1970s typesetting markup language

== Places in the United States ==
- Roff, Kentucky
- Roff, Oklahoma

== People ==
- Derek Roff (born 1930), Australian ranger at Uluṟu-Kata Tjuṯa National Park
- Derek Roff (born 1949), Canadian biologist
- Don Roff (born 1966), American writer and filmmaker
- Jeremy Roff (born 1983), Australian middle-distance runner
- Joe Roff (born 1975), Australian rugby union player
- Rosie Roff (born 1989), British ring girl and model

== See also ==
- Roffe (disambiguation)
- ROF (disambiguation)
- Ruff (disambiguation)
