= Sign of the Pagan =

1954 film by Douglas Sirk

- Film poster by Reynold Brown
- Directed by: Douglas Sirk
- Written by: Oscar Brodney; Barre Lyndon
- Based on: story by Oscar Brodney
- Produced by: Albert J Cohen
- Starring: Jeff Chandler; Jack Palance; Ludmilla Tchérina; Rita Gam
- Cinematography: Russell Metty
- Edited by: Al Clark
- Music by: Frank Skinner; Hans J. Salter
- Production company: Universal Pictures
- Distributed by: Universal Pictures
- Release dates: December 18, 1954 (United States); December 23, 1954 (Los Angeles)
- Running time: 92 minutes
- Country: United States
- Language: English
- Budget: $1.5 million
- Box office: $2.5 million (US rentals) or $6 million

Sign of the Pagan is a 1954 American historical drama film directed by Douglas Sirk, shot in CinemaScope (color by Technicolor), and released by Universal Pictures. The film stars Jeff Chandler, Jack Palance, Ludmilla Tchérina, and Rita Gam.

== Plot ==
During the fifth century, the Roman Empire is divided into two parts: the West, with its capital in Rome, run by Emperor Valentinian III, and the East, with its capital in Constantinople, run by Emperor Theodosius. The Empire is under attack by the Huns under Attila. Roman soldier Marcian is carrying a message from Valentinian warning Theodosius of the Huns, when he is captured by Attila. Attila is impressed by Marcian's honesty and courage. He carves out the arrow that has been shot into his leg, causing Marcian to pass out. Over the next few days, Attila keeps Marcian hostage in the hopes of learning more about the Romans' plans. The Huns capture a local king's family and Attila orders them killed, except for the daughter, Ildico, whom he takes as his wife. Later, when Attila's daughter, Kubra, shows off her father's prize stallion, Marcian steals it and flees to Constantinople.

In Constantinople, Marcian is befriended by General Paulinus, who confides that Theodosius is planning to join forces with the Huns against Valentinian. This is confirmed when Marcian brings his emperor's message to Theodosius, who throws him out. Theodosius' sister, Princess Pulcheria, calls Marcian to her chambers. She admits that she loves Rome, but is kept prisoner within the palace walls. She names Marcian the captain of her guard, asking him to protect her from Theodosius' mutiny. That night, Theodosius holds a feast to welcome the Hun leaders. Although Attila has not been invited, he arrives to command the allegiance of all other barbarians, and easily defeats the strongest man in Constantinople. Frightened, Theodosius offers him furs and jewels, but Attila demands only that Marcian teach the Huns how to use Roman weapons. Although Kubra is the first to practice with the weapons, Marcian deposits her in the harem bathing pool.

Later, Pulcheria sends for Attila. She asks him to release Marcian from his duties, but Attila kisses her roughly and then leaves to meet Theodosius, who agrees to pay each month in return for Attila's promise not to attack. Later, Marcian also approaches the Hun, warning him that because Rome is Christian, it will never fall. Attila merely laughs at him, but when Kubra visits the church the next day, she is awed by the portrait of Mary and longs for the peace she feels there. She tries to refuse to leave, but Attila forces her to accompany the Huns out of the city. The next night, Attila gathers the barbarian leaders and announces that they will attack Rome immediately. As soon as his soothsayer announces that the signs are positive, a bolt of lightning strikes a tree that falls on him. Although this concerns the Huns, Attila names it a good omen. Soon after, his men bring two captured monks to him, and Attila, who does not dare anger the Christian God, orders the soldiers killed. The monks then beg him not to kill the soldiers, baffling Attila.

As the Huns gather outside Rome, Marcian, finding no help for Valentinian with Theodosius, prepares to flee the palace, but is captured upon stopping to bid Pulcheria goodbye. While Attila's new Persian seer, relates a vision of Marcian as emperor, Paulinus releases Marcian from the dungeon and the two sneak into Pulcheria's. Together, they decide to gather the army against Theodosius and install Pulcheria to the throne. After Theodosius is forced to abdicate, Pulcheria names Marcian her top general and announces her plans to travel to Rome with him and their army to help guard its walls. Meanwhile, the Persian seer is plagued by visions of God and martyrs in the clouds calling for Attila's death, and Attila remembers an image his childhood nurse saw in which he died under the shadow of a cross. Though fearful, he continues to disregard the signs. When Marcian reaches Rome, he finds Valentinian leaving, but retains two battalions to add to his own to protect the city.

That night, Attila orders the attack, but stops when Pope Leo I arrives to name Rome the temple of God and foresee Attila's downfall, as portended by the lightning strike. Afterward, Attila realizes that Kubra must have told the Pope about the lightning, and, though he is heartbroken, kills her for betraying him. In his sleep that night, he sees a vision of the martyrs marching against him and, crazed, orders the Huns to retreat. Marcian hears and immediately plans to ambush Attila when he reaches the nearest city. The surprise attack demolishes the Huns, who soon fall. Marcian finds Attila and duels with him, but it is Ildico, who has spent the last months overflowing with rage, who drives the fatal dagger into his chest. As prophesied, Attila dies with the sword's handle forming the shadow of a cross on the ground. Days later, Pulcheria reunites the halves of the Empire and names Marcian emperor, to the delight of the Roman people.

== Cast ==
- Jeff Chandler as Marcian
- Jack Palance as Attila
- Ludmilla Tchérina as Princess Pulcheria
- Rita Gam as Kubra
- Jeff Morrow as General Paulinus
- George Dolenz as Emperor Theodosius II
- Eduard Franz as Astrologer
- Allison Hayes as Ildico
- Alexander Scourby as Chrysaphius
- Howard Petrie as Gundahar
- Michael Ansara as Edecon
- Leo Gordon as Bleda
- Moroni Olsen as Pope Leo I
- Fred Nurney as Chamberlain
- Sara Shane as Myra
- Pat Hogan as Sangiban
- Robo Bechi as Chilothe
- Charles Horvath as Olt
- Glenn Thompson as Seyte
- Chuck Robertson as Mirrai
- Walter Coy as Emperor Valentinian III
- Rusty Westcoatt as Tula
- Norbert Schiller as Seer

== Production ==
The film was announced by Universal in October 1953. Ludmilla Tchérina was to make her dramatic debut in the film. She was a ballerina who had been signed to a long-term contract to Universal after a series of screen tests, including some with Jeff Chandler. Chandler was assigned the male lead and Douglas Sirk given the job of directing. The movie was going to be Universal's first using CinemaScope. Jack Palance, then coming off a second Oscar nomination, soon signed to play Attila the Hun. Chandler told Hedda Hopper that the role was the best he had ever had and that the movie would be Universal's most expensive of that year.

Jeff Morrow had a two-film-a-year deal with Universal and appeared in Sign of the Pagan as the second film. Allison Hayes was a model who was spotted by the wife of Earl Warren at a party in Washington. Mrs Warren suggested she try her luck in Hollywood and she succeeded in getting a contract with Universal. She played Attila's young wife; Jack Palance injured her during their love scenes.

Football star Frank Gifford worked as a stuntman in some of the action scenes.

== Release ==
Another film about Attila the Hun came out around the same time, Attila, starring Anthony Quinn in the title role.

A novelisation of the script by Roger Fuller was published in 1955 in time for the film's release.

== Proposed sequel ==
Universal bought a script by Harold Lamb, Hannibal of Carthage as a possible sequel, also to star Jack Palance. However, it was never made.
