= Ortlieb (Germanic heroic legend) =

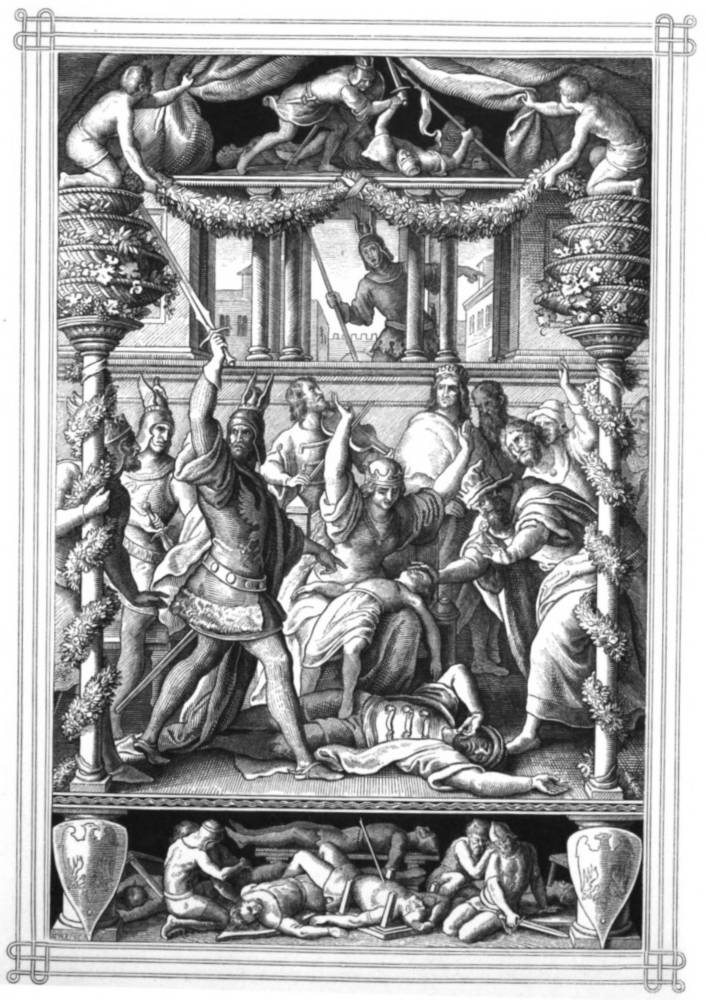
Hagen Slays Ortlieb, Julius Schnorr von Carolsfeld, 1843

Ortlieb is the son of Kriemhild (Gudrun) and Etzel (Atli) and a minor figure in Germanic heroic legend and literature.

He is definitively named in the Nibelungenlied. Here, he is decapitated by Hagen, after the latter hears of Bloedelin's attack on the Burgundians, which Kriemhild had urged him to undertake. After Kriemhild decapitates her own brother Gunther, Hagen is in turn decapitated by Kriemhild after she forces him to reveal the location of the hoard of the Nibelungen.

In the Þiðreks saga, he is likewise killed by Hagen (Högni) in the hall, after he provokes him following the counsel of his mother. This causes a fierce fight to erupt. Kriemhild (Grimhild) is then killed after an enraged Thidrek sees her checking if her brothers are dead by sticking pieces of flaming wood into their mouths. Similarly, in the Heldenbücher she has her son provoke Hagen, who kills him, leading to an outbreak of hostilities in which many heroes die. When Dietrich takes Gunther and Hagen prisoner, she cuts off their heads, causing Dietrich to cut her to pieces.

In the Scandinavian Prose Edda and the Poetic Edda's Atlakviða and Atlamál hin groenlenzku, Ortlieb is not mentioned by name but there are references to "Atli's sons". Here, after Atli kills her brothers, Gudrun (Kriemhild) makes him eat the flesh of his own sons.

In the Guðrúnarkviða II poem, however, Atli simply has a dream about eating his sons, and Gudrun consoles him, interpreting the dream harmlessly, by explaining that the people will talk about sacrifice.
