= Radłów (disambiguation) =

Radłów is a town in Lesser Poland Voivodeship, southern Poland.

Radłów may also refer to the following villages:

- Radłów, Greater Poland Voivodeship (west-central Poland)
- Radłów, Opole Voivodeship (German: Radlau, south-west Poland)

== See also ==
- Radlov (Radloff)
