= Margarete Schön =

German actress (1895–1985)

- Born: Margarethe Schippang; 7 April 1895; Magdeburg, German Empire
- Died: 26 December 1985 (aged 90); West Berlin, West Germany
- Occupation: Actor
- Years active: 1912–1960
- Spouse: Robert Dinesen (died 1972)

Margarete Schön (born Margarethe Schippang; 7 April 1895 – 26 December 1985) was a German stage and film actress whose career spanned nearly fifty years. She is internationally recognized for her role as Kriemhild in director Fritz Lang's Die Nibelungen series of two silent fantasy films, Die Nibelungen: Siegfried and Nibelungen: Kriemhild's Revenge.

== Stage career ==
Born in Magdeburg, Germany as Margarethe Schippang, she received private acting lessons with the theatre actor Hans Calm in Dessau. In 1912 she made her stage debut in Bad Freienwalde. Shortly thereafter, she received a commitment at the municipal theater of Bromberg (now, Bydgoszcz, in present-day Poland). From 1915 to 1918 she was part of the ensemble cast of the Deutsches Theater in Hanover, and from 1918 to 1945 she performed at the Staatstheater Berlin.

== Film career ==
In 1919, Margarete Schön made her film debut in the Carl Wilhelm-directed Du meine Himmelskönigin. She would spend the next two years in several small roles for directors Carl Froelich, Hanna Henning, Alfred Halm, Walter Schmidthässler and her husband, director Robert Dinesen before earning a starring role in Urban Gad's 1922 drama Hanneles Himmelfahrt.

It was in the 1924 release of Fritz Lang's two-part fantasy serial Die Nibelungen that she would cement her popularity in Germany and achieve international recognition as an actress. Co-written by Lang's then-wife Thea von Harbou, the films were based on the epic poem Nibelungenlied written around AD 1200. Schön had a starring role as the vengeful Kriemhild, opposite actor Paul Richter's role as the epic hero Siegfried.

Schön made the transition to sound films with ease and her film career was prolific through the 1930s. During the Second World War she appeared in approximately ten films, but generally avoided roles in Nazi propaganda films and stayed decidedly apolitical. One exception was an uncredited bit part in Veit Harlan's 1945 nationalistic film Kolberg. One of her most popular roles of the era was the character Frau Knauer in the Helmut Weiss-directed comedy Die Feuerzangenbowle in 1944 for Terra-Filmkunst studios.

After the Second World War Schön continued in West German films as a popular character actress, she also worked extensively as a radio personality. From 1948 to 1950 she worked for DEFA (Deutsche Film-Aktiengesellschaft), the state-owned film studio of East Germany. She retired from acting in 1960.

== Personal life ==
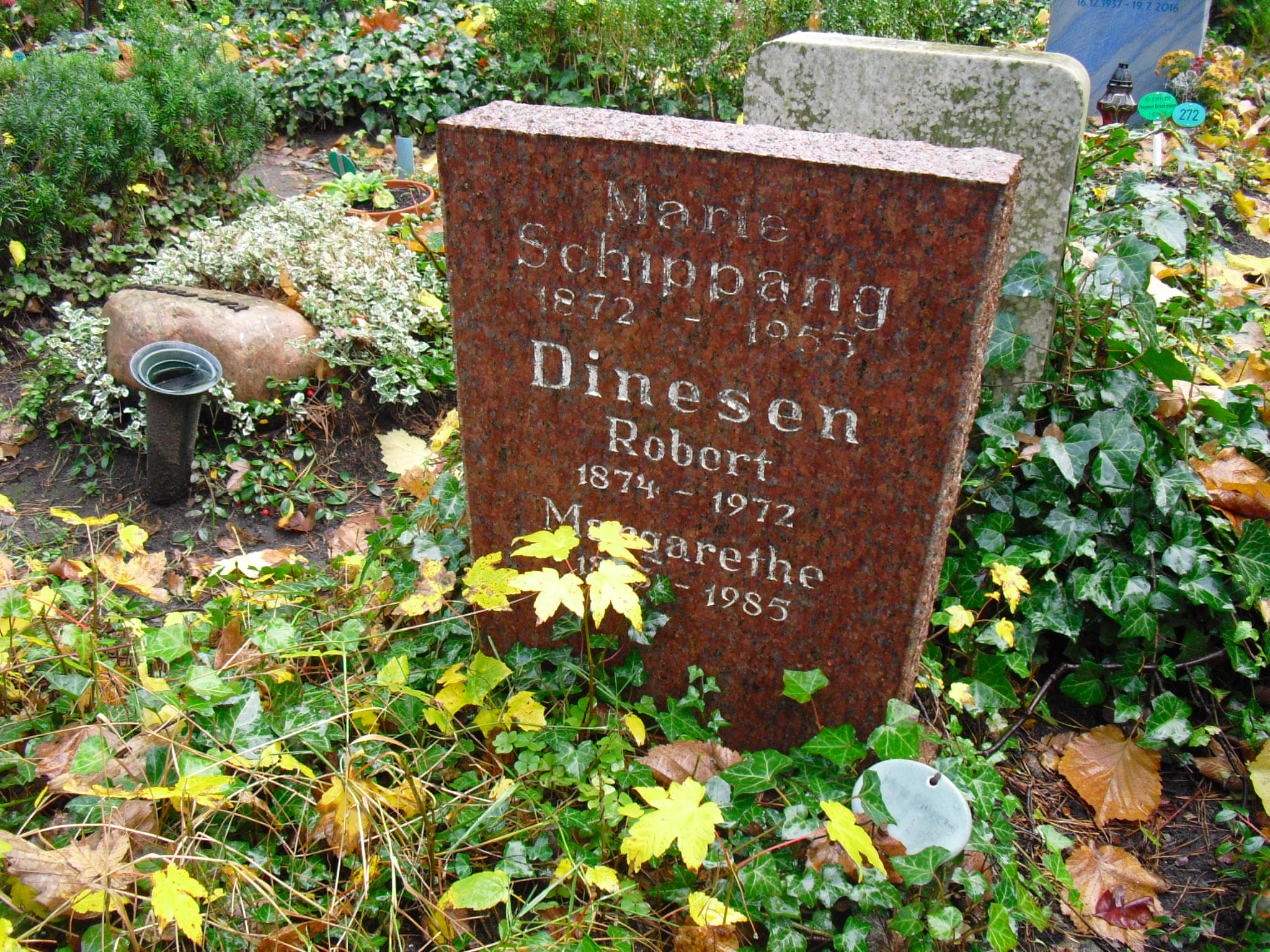
The grave of Margarete Schön, her mother Marie, and husband Robert Dinesen, at the Friedhof Heerstraße cemetery in Berlin-Westend

Schön was married to Danish director Robert Dinesen. In 1968, she was awarded the Bundesfilmpreis for many years of outstanding achievements in German film. She died in West Berlin in 1985, aged 90, and is buried at the Friedhof Heerstraße cemetery in Berlin-Westend.

== Selected filmography ==
- Schirokko (1918)
- Freiheit, Gleichheit, Brüderlichkeit (1919)
- Das Tor der Freiheit (1919)
- Spiele eines Milliardärs (1919)
- The Dancer (1919, part 1, 2) - Maria Friesländer
- The Duty to Live (1919)
- Du meine Himmelskönigin (1919)
- The Loves of Käthe Keller (1919)
- Der Tempel der Liebe (1919)
- Gewalt gegen Recht (1920)
- Das große Licht (1920)
- The Golden Crown (1920) - Prinzessin Elvira
- The Women of Gnadenstein (1920) - Ruth
- Der gelbe Tod (1920, part 2)
- The Passion of Inge Krafft (1921) - Dagmar, Harry Radens Frau
- The Sleeping Volcano (1922)
- Kinder der Zeit (1922)
- Hanneles Himmelfahrt (1922) - Johanna, Hanneles Mutter
- Insulted and Humiliated (1922)
- Firnenrausch (1922)
- Die Nibelungen (1924) - Kriemhild
- Struggle for the Soil (1925) - Franz von Wulfshagen
- Wallenstein (1925, part 1)
- Our Heavenly Bodies (1925)
- Bismarck (1925, part 1)
- Lace (1926)
- A Day of Roses in August (1927) - Helene von Rudow
- Die Welt ohne Waffen (1927)
- Youthful Indiscretion (1929)
- The Youths (1929)
- Beware of Loose Women (1929)
- Der Weg durch die Nacht (1929)
- Hocuspocus (1930) - Geschworene
- The Flute Concert of Sanssouci (1930) - Princess Amalie
- The Street Song (1931) - Emma
- In the Employ of the Secret Service (1931) - Hans hustru
- Farewell Waltz (1934) - Madame Mercier
- The Green Domino (1935) - Frau von Falck
- Mazurka (1935) - (uncredited)
- Victoria (1935) - Die Müllerin, Mutter Johannes'
- A Doctor of Conviction (1936) - Frau Felgentreu
- Moral (1936)
- Girls in White (1936) - Maria Petrowna
- Annemarie. Die Geschichte einer jungen Liebe (1936) - Mutter Renken
- Such Great Foolishness (1937)
- The Woman at the Crossroads (1938) - Oberschwester Hermine
- The False Step (1939) - Frau von Padden
- Men Are That Way (1939) - Frau Petersen
- Her First Experience (1939) - Mother Schäfer
- Annelie (1941)
- The Dismissal (1942) - Fürstin Johanna Bismarck
- Du gehörst zu mir (1943) - Mutter Groone
- Back Then (1943) - Gast beim Abendempfang (uncredited)
- Die Feuerzangenbowle (1944) - Frau Knauer
- The Buchholz Family (1944) - Frau Reiferstein
- Marriage of Affection (1944) - Frau Reiferstein
- Kolberg (1945)
- Blum Affair (1948) - Sophie Konrad
- The Great Mandarin (1949)
- Quartet of Five (1949)
- The Blue Swords (1949) - Frau Zorn
- Semmelweis - Retter der Mütter (1950)
- Meines Vaters Pferde (1954, part 1, 2) - Schwester Berta
- Captain Wronski (1954) - Gefängnisbeamtin
- Herr über Leben und Tod (1955)
- Oberwachtmeister Borck (1955) - neugierige Zeugin
