= Rado =

Rado or Radó may refer to:

== People ==
=== Given name ===
- Rado (mayor of the palace) (died 617), Burgundian palace mayor
- Rado (palatine) (died 1057), Hungarian noble
- Rado Rasoanaivo (born 1969), Malagasy footballer

=== Surname ===
- Aina Rado (1947–2017), Spanish trade unionist and politician
- Aladar Rado (1882–1914), Hungarian composer
- Alex Rado (1911–1995), American football player and coach
- Alexander Radó (1899–1981), Hungarian-born cartographer and Soviet military intelligence agent
- András Radó (born 1993), Hungarian footballer
- Augusto Rado (1912–1996), Italian tennis player
- Elisabeth Radó (1899–1986), Yugoslavian opera singer
- Christian Rado (born 1975), American racing driver
- Gaby Rado (1955–2003), Hungarian-born British television journalist
- James Rado (1932–2022), American actor
- Jonathan Rado, American musician and producer
- Ľudovít Rado (1914–1992), Slovak footballer
- Richard Rado (1906–1989), German mathematician
- Sándor Radó (psychoanalyst) (1890–1972), Hungarian-American psychoanalyst
- Sándor Radó (actor) (1891–1944), Hungarian actor
- Tibor Radó (1895–1965), Hungarian mathematician
- Türkan Rado (1915–2007), Turkish female professor of jurisprudence

== Other ==
- Rado (watchmaker), a luxury Swiss watch brand owned by The Swatch Group
