= Roffe =

Roffe or Roffé is a surname. Notable people with the surname include:

- Carlos Roffé (1943–2005), Argentine film and television actor
- Diann Roffe (born 1967), American alpine ski racer and Olympic gold medalist
- Reina Roffé (born 1951), Argentine writer
- Tatiana Garmash-Roffe, Russian writer

== Other ==
- Roffe engraving families of London

== See also ==
- Roff (disambiguation)
- Ruffe, a species of freshwater fish
