= Guðrúnarkviða II =

Probably the oldest poem of the Sigurd cycle

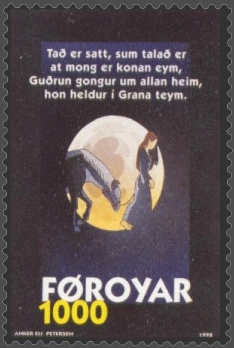
Guðrún has found Sigurd's horse Grani and has understood that Sigurd is dead. Illustration on a Faroese stamp by Anker Eli Petersen.

Guðrúnarkviða II, The Second Lay of Gudrún, or Guðrúnarkviða hin forna, The Old Lay of Gudrún is probably the oldest poem of the Sigurd cycle, according to Henry Adams Bellows.

The poem was composed before the year 1000 and Bellows considered it to be in a "rather bad shape", but it was in that shape that it provided material for the Völsunga saga, where it was faithfully paraphrased. He states, however, that it is the only Old Norse poem from an earlier period than the year 1000 in the Sigurd tradition that has come down to modern times in a roughly complete form. The other older poems, Reginsmál, Fáfnismál and Sigrdrifumál, are collections of fragments and only the last part of Brot af Sigurðarkviðu remains. The remaining poems in the cycle are generally dated to the 11th century and the 12th century.

Bellows states that another reason for assuming that the poem derives from a lament originating in Germany is the fact that Sigurd's death takes place in the forest, as in the Nibelungenlied, and not in his bed. Other elements relating closely to the German tradition are her mother and her brother insisting that she marry Atli, the slaying of the Gjukungs and her future revenge on Atli.

== Synopsis ==
King Þjóðrekr was staying at the court of Atli, and Þjóðrekr had just lost most of his warriors in battle.

Þjóðrekr and Atli's queen Guðrún were alone together and discussed their sorrows. Guðrún told Þjóðrekr that she was a young maiden when her father Gjúki gave her away to Sigurd with a dowry of gold. Then her brothers murdered her hero Sigurd:

4. Grani rann at þingi,
- gnýr var at heyra, -
en þá Sigurðr
sjalfr eigi kom;
öll váru söðuldýr
sveita stokkin
ok of vanið vási
und vegöndum.

4. From the Thing ran Grani
with thundering feet,
But thence did Sigurth
himself come never;
Covered with sweat
was the saddle-bearer,
Wont the warrior's
weight to bear.

Guðrún held the rein of the horse and began to cry, as she understood what had happened:

5. Gekk ek grátandi
við Grana ræða,
úrughlýra
jó frá ek spjalla;
hnipnaði Grani þá,
drap í gras höfði,
jór þat vissi,
eigendr né lifðu-t.

5. Weeping I sought
with Grani to speak,
With tear-wet cheeks
for the tale I asked;
The head of Grani
was bowed to the grass,
The steed knew well
his master was slain.

When she met her brothers, Gunnarr was bowing his head, but Högni told her the news that Sigurd had been slain, but that he had taken their brother Guthormr with him. He further told her that she could find Sigurd on the southern road where she would hear the cry of ravens and howling wolves. Guðrún went into the forest to search for what was left by the wolves and found Sigurd.

When she found Sigurd, Guðrún did not cry, wail or wring her hands, although she was so sad that she did not want to live anymore. She left the mountains and travelled for five days, until she saw the hall of Halfr, in Denmark, where she stayed for three and a half years with Thora, the daughter of Hakon.

Thora and Guðrún enjoyed themselves by weaving tapestries of southern halls, Danish swans and warriors:

16. Skip Sigmundar
skriðu frá landi,
gylltar grímur,
grafnir stafnar;
byrðu vit á borða,
þat er þeir börðusk
Sigarr ok Siggeirr
suðr á Fjóni.

16. Sigmund's ship
by the land was sailing,
Golden the figure-head,
gay the beaks;
On board we wove
the warriors faring,
Sigar and Siggeir,
south to Fjon.

Her mother Grimhild asked her sons Gunnarr and Högni what kind of wergild they would like to give their sister for the killing of her husband Sigurd and her son Sigmund, and they were both ready to compensate their sister. Guðrún met her mother, brothers and Valdar, the king of Denmark, and three men named Jarizleif, Eymoth and Jarizskar.

They wanted to give her gifts to console her but she did not trust them. Then, her mother gave her a something to drink, a potion of forgetfulness:

Færði mér Grímhildr
full at drekka
svalt ok sárligt,
né ek sakar munðak;
þat var of aukit
jarðar magni,
svalköldum sæ
ok sónum dreyra.

Váru í horni
hvers kyns stafir
ristnir ok roðnir,
- ráða ek né máttak, -
lyngfiskr langr,
lands Haddingja
ax óskorit,
innleið dyra.

22. A draught did Grimhild
give me to drink,
Bitter and cold;
I forgot my cares;
For mingled therein
was magic earth,
Ice-cold sea,
and the blood of swine.

23. In the cup were runes
of every kind,
Written and reddened,
I could not read them;
A heather-fish
from the Haddings' land,
An ear uncut,
and the entrails of beasts.

The poem relates that Guðrún forgot and the three kings kneeled before her and Grimhildr began to speak. Her mother told her that she gave her all her father's wealth, and that she would also have Buðli's wealth because she was to become Atli's wife.

Húnskar meyjar,
þær er hlaða spjöldum
ok gera gull fagrt,
svá at þér gaman þykki;
ein skaltu ráða
auði Buðla,
gulli göfguð
ok gefin Atla.

27. Hunnish women,
skilled in weaving,
Who gold make fair
to give thee joy,
And the wealth of Buthli
thine shall be,
Gold-decked one,
as Atli's wife.

Guðrún answered that she did not wish to marry Atli, but her mother responded that with Atli she would be as happy as if both Sigurd and her son Sigmund were still alive. Furthermore, if she did not marry Atli, she would live without husband for the rest of her life. Guðrún responded that her mother should not be so eager to giver her away to the Huns, and she prophesied that Atli would kill Gunnarr and tear out the heart of Högni. Grímhildr began to weep when she heard the prophecy and told Guðrún that she was forced to give her away to Atli.

Guðrún then continued her lament by telling that she married Atli for her kinsmen's sake. She was never happy with Atli and she lost her sons when her brothers died, and she would kill Atli.

She travelled to Atli first a week through cold lands, then a week on water and lastly a week through land that lacked water. They arrived to high walls and guardians opened the gates.

Bellows comments that there appears to be a large lacuna following her arrival to Atli. He adds that the ending of the lament appears to have been replaced another poem, because it deals with how Atli told Guðrún that he had had foreboding dreams of being killed by her. The description of the dream begins with this stanza:

Svá mik nýliga
nornir vekja", -
vílsinnis spá
vildi, at ek réða, -
"hugða ek þik, Guðrún
Gjúka dóttir,
læblöndnum hjör
leggja mik í gögnum.

39. Now from sleep
the Norns have waked me
With visions of terror,--
To thee will I tell them;
Methought thou, Guthrun,
Gjuki's daughter,
With poisoned blade
didst pierce my body.

Without understanding the meaning of the dream, Atli describes his future eating of his own sons, served to him by their own mother Guðrún, in revenge for Atli's killing her brothers.

Hugða ek mér af hendi
hauka fljúga
bráðalausa
bölranna til;
hjörtu hugða ek þeira
við hunang tuggin,
sorgmóðs sefa,
sollin blóði.

Hugða ek mér af hendi
hvelpa losna,
glaums andvana,
gylli báðir;
hold hugða ek þeira
at hræum orðit,
nauðigr nái
nýta ek skyldak.

42. I dreamed my hawks
from my hand had flown,
Eager for food,
to an evil house;
I dreamed their hearts
with honey I ate,
Soaked in blood,
and heavy my sorrow.

43. Hounds I dreamed
from my hand I loosed,
Loud in hunger
and pain they howled;
Their flesh methought
was eagles' food,
And their bodies now
I needs must eat.

There the poem ends in a few cryptic lines where Guðrún says that people will talk of a sacrifice.
