= ROF =

ROF, or RoF, may refer to:

- Rate of fire
- Radio over Fiber
- Republic Of Finland
- Rhetorics of Fantasy, a nonfiction book on fantasy literary theory by Farah Mendlesohn
- Rise of Flight, a World War I air combat simulation game for PCs
- Rossini Opera Festival
- Royal Ordnance Factory
- Rolling on Floor
