= Derek Roff =

- Born: July 19, 1949 (age 77)
- Education: University of British Columbia
- Scientific career
- Fields: Evolutionary genetics; Population ecology; Life history theory
- Workplaces: McGill University, University of California at Riverside

Derek A. Roff FRSC (born July 19, 1949) is a professor emeritus of evolutionary ecology at McGill University, currently associated with the University of California at Riverside. His research focuses include population genetics, quantitative genetics, and life history evolution.

Roff is an elected Fellow of the Royal Society of Canada and of the American Association for the Advancement of Science.
