= Radl =

Radl may refer to:

- Radl Pass in the Alps
- Emanuel Rádl, Czech biologist and philosopher
