= Aladár Donászi =

Hungarian robber and serial killer

- Born: August 1954; Pécs, Hungarian People's Republic
- Died: August 10, 2001 (aged 46–47); Sopronkőhida, Hungary
- Cause of death: Suicide
- Other names: Márton Kálmán Gyula "Győr Cop Killer" "Scary Killer" "Hunters' Killer"
- Conviction: Murder
- Penalty: Life imprisonment

Details
- Victims: 4
- Span of crimes: 1991–1992
- Country: Hungary
- States: Győr-Moson-Sopron, Fejér
- Date apprehended: May 4, 1994

Aladár Donászi (August 1954 – August 10, 2001) was a Hungarian robber and serial killer, who was one of the most sought-after Hungarian fugitives in the 1990s.

== Biography ==
=== Youth ===
Aladár Donászi was born in Pécs in 1954. Contrary to the background of most violent criminals, he was born into a family of intellectuals (his father worked as a public prosecutor and his mother was a teacher). He was a good student, and after graduation he was admitted to a law school. However, the young man did not start studying, and instead married at the age of 19. Seeing that obligatory military service was unavoidable, he applied to a military college. After graduating, he began serving as an artillery officer.

=== Beginning of criminal career ===
Donászi began preparing for a criminal career during his years in the People's Army. On March 17, 1980, he deserted, taking his rifle with him, later using it while robbing the National Savings Bank of Budapest on Irinyi Street. He stole 372,000 forints, but he was eventually captured. In September of the same year, he was sentenced to 12 years in jail. While serving his sentence in the Star Prison, he met his future associate, László Bene, with whom he spent most of his time in prison. Donászi was a good-natured prisoner, writing regularly in the jail's newspaper and working as a scribe. Due to his disciplined nature, he was able to mislead prison authorities into thinking that his punishment had served its purpose, and after nine years imprisonment, he was released in March 1989.

=== Crimes ===
After Donászi's release, he met up with Bene, and in 1989, they started their long series against tobacco depots. Mostly based in Transdanubia, they were involved in warehouse scams and high-value thefts. From 1989 to 1990, they made a total of 16.5 million forints from stolen cigarettes, sold through illicit trafficking in Budapest. Donászi, thinking he did not fit the image of a hard-faced criminal, decided to take actions for greater results. The pair bought weapons in Vienna and started practicing shooting in outskirts, also getting fake papers (Donászi obtained a fake internal passport - with his own photograph - from a forger with the name Márton Kálmán Gyula.)

On June 12, 1991, Donászi carried out his first attack. In Győr, he tried to steal the salaries of the employees of a water company. At the door of the company, he expected the arrival of a car carrying money. When the car arrived, Donászi first seriously wounded the officer guarding the money, and then the porter manning the gate. The officer later died from his injuries in hospital, but the porter survived. Donászi's loot amounted to 870,000 forints.

On May 11, 1992, Donászi and Bene attacked a taxi driver and his passenger carrying the Budapest Skála department store's revenue. When they observed a student boarding a taxi on Vak Bottyán Street, Donászi walked to the taxi and shot the money-carrying student without a word. In the meantime, Bene shot at the driver, then took the money and escaped. The student later died from his injuries, while the seriously injured taxi driver survived. The criminals did not get much from this robbery, however, as inadvertently they had stolen the bag which only contained other bags.

On November 8, 1992, Donászi and Bene practiced shooting on the outskirts of Sárszentmihály. Two hunters approached, thinking they were poachers. When he saw them, Donászi shot and killed both of them. After these murders, investigators determined that the bullets were fired from the same weapon used in the attacks in Győr and on the taxi driver. During subsequent questioning of local residents, Donászi's accomplice, Bene, was reportedly seen in the area.

On January 22, 1993, Donászi and Bene ambushed the Alfa store's cash-in-transit van in Újpest. The security guard, however, came earlier than expected. Donászi, who wanted to make the plan work at all costs, started shooting, but accidentally hit Bene's car. The shots had severely wounded Bene in his cheeks, which would only be removed by a surgeon later on. The relationship between the two robbers turned colder after the failure, and Donászi went abroad for a short time.

On November 13, 1993, Donászi carried out his last successful attack when he attacked a post office on Soroksarí Street in Budapest. During the robbery, Bene only took part as a driver, but Donászi was still able to bring a fortune of 15 million forints. The police arrested a post office employee who was kept in prison for months. After the attack, the couple learned that a friend of their acquaintances knew of their murders and robberies. Donászi considered the woman to be a risk, so he prepared to kill her. However, this did not happen, as on May 4, 1994, both criminals were arrested.

=== Trial and death ===
When Donászi was arrested, he declared that he was to be considered a prisoner of war. He longed for a long punishment and thought that the news of his murders and cruel acts would give him enough prestige in prison to be able to rise to the top of the hierarchy of prisoners, crowning his criminal career. During public reconstructions of the robberies, he calmly and intelligently reported on his offenses. In court, on January 26, 1995, Aladár Donászi was found guilty of shooting with intent, stealing for profit and murder, and sentenced to life imprisonment. However, his "fairy tale" dream would not be realized. Following his arrival, the director of Sopronkőhida Prison placed Donászi in an isolated cell. During his imprisonment, Donászi took part in preparing a report on his life, giving correspondence and rarely interviews. He could have been released in early 2014, but on the evening of August 10, 2001, Donászi killed himself in his cell by cutting his wrists with a razor.

== In the media ==
Donászi and Bene were the favourite figures of tabloids because of their cruelty. Zoltán Tabori published a novel titled Nagyvadak (Big Game) about their crimes, based on several interviews. A film titled Gengszterfim (Gangster Movie) was released in 1998. Aladár Donászi was also noted as a deterrent example by the Hungarian movement for the restoration of death penalty during the 2010s.

== See also ==
- List of serial killers by country
