= Gudrun =

Legendary figure in Germanic lore

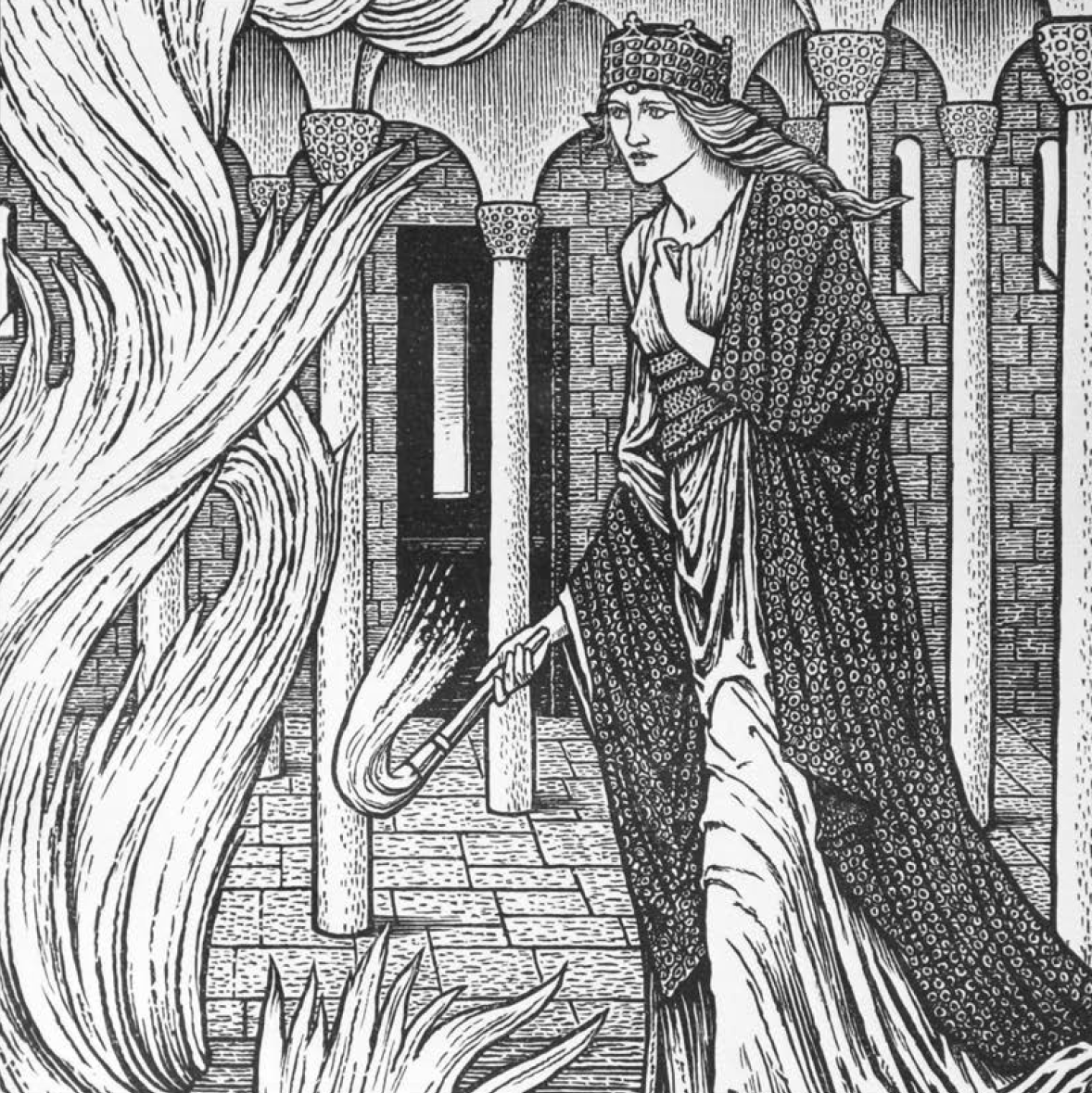
Woodcut by Edward Burne-Jones, for William Morris's work, Sigurd the Volsung (London: Kelmscott Press, 1898).

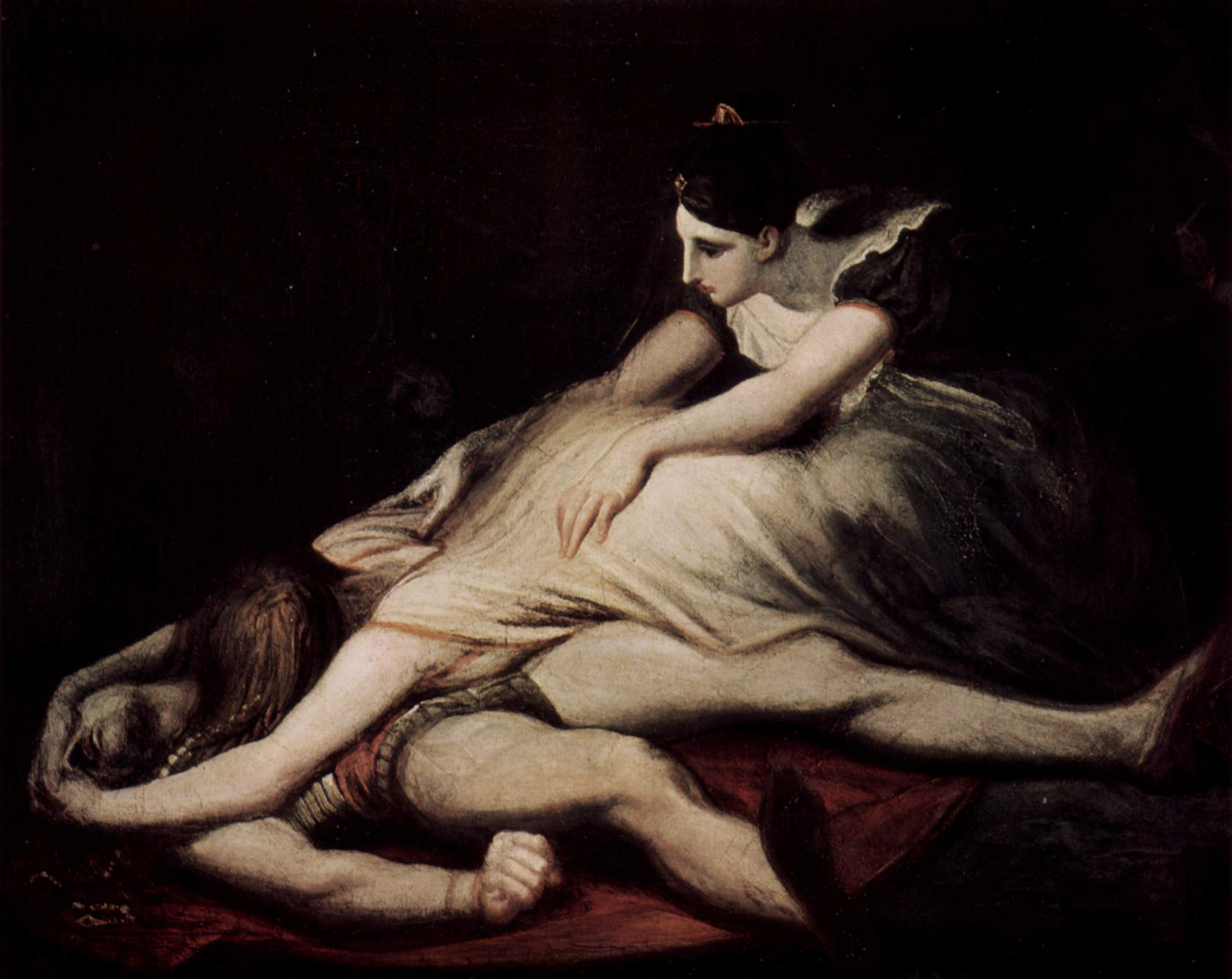
Kriemhild discovers Siegfried's corpse. Painting by Johann Heinrich Füssli, 1817.

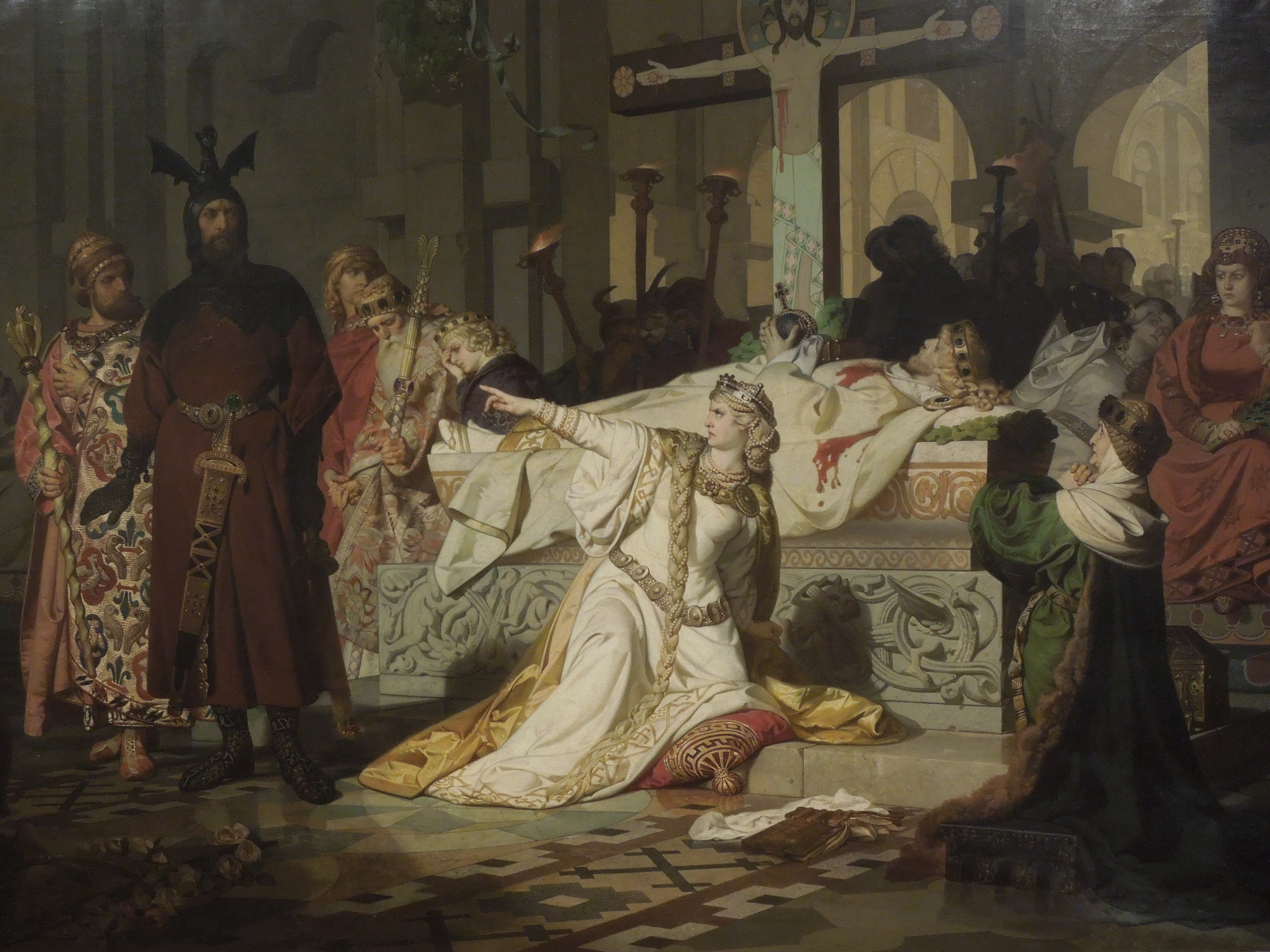
Kriemhild accuses Hagen of murdering Siegfried. Painting by Emil Lauffer, 1879.

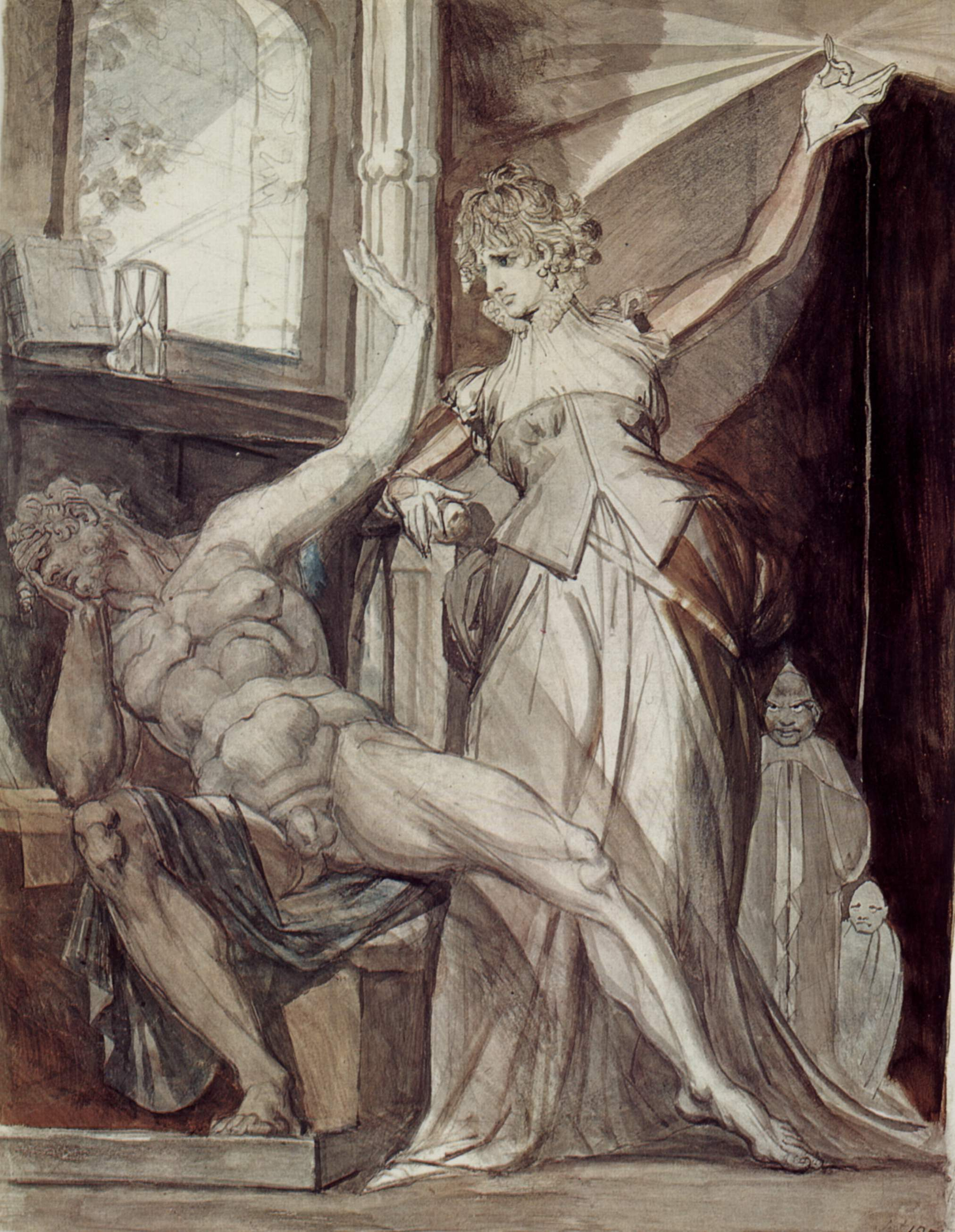
Kriemhild and Gunther, Johann Heinrich Füssli, 1807.

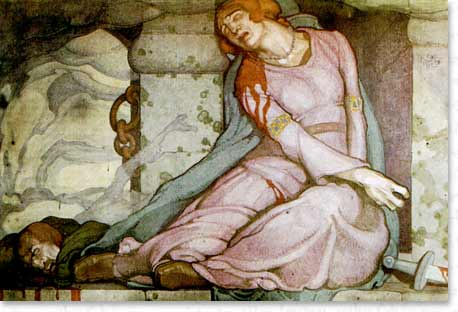
Kriemhild's Death, Karl Schmoll von Eisenwerth, 1911.

Gudrun (/ˈɡʊdruːn/ GUUD-roon; Old Norse: Guðrún) or Kriemhild (/ˈkriːmhɪlt/ KREEM-hilt; Middle High German: Kriemhilt) is the wife of Sigurd/Siegfried and a major figure in Germanic heroic legend and literature. She is believed to have her origins in Ildico, last wife of Attila the Hun, and two queens of the Merovingian dynasty, Brunhilda of Austrasia and Fredegund.

In both the Continental (German) and Scandinavian traditions, Gudrun/Kriemhild is the sister of the Burgundian king Gunther/Gunnar and marries the hero Siegfried/Sigurd. Both traditions also feature a major rivalry between Gudrun and Brunhild, Gunther's wife, over their respective ranks. In both traditions, once Sigurd has been murdered, Gudrun is married to Etzel/Atli, the legendary analogue of Attila the Hun. In the Norse tradition, Atli desires the hoard of the Nibelungen, which the Burgundians had taken after murdering Sigurd, and invites them to his court; intending to kill them. Gudrun then avenges her brothers by killing Atli and burning down his hall. The Norse tradition then tells of her further life as mother of Svanhild and enemy of Jormunrekr. In the continental tradition, Kriemhild instead desires revenge for her brothers' murder of Siegfried, and invites them to visit Etzel's court intending to kill them. Her revenge destroys both the Huns and the Burgundians, and in the end she herself is killed.

In Richard Wagner's Der Ring des Nibelungen, Siegfried's wife is known as Gutrune. As Wagner's cycle ends with Siegfried's funeral and its immediate aftermath, it does not include her marriage to Atli/Etzel or revenge for Siegfried's death.

Some of the differences and similarities between Gudrun and Kriemhild in the Scandinavian and continental Germanic traditions can be seen in the following two stanzas taken from original sources. The first is Kriemhild's introduction in the Nibelungenlied:

Ez wuohs in Burgonden ein vil edel magedîn,
daz in allen landen niht schoeners mohte sîn,
Kriemhilt geheizen. si wart ein schoene wîp.
dar umbe muosen degene vil verliesen den lîp.

Translation:

There grew up in Burgundy a most noble maiden.
No one in all the lands could be fairer.
She was called Kriemhilt—she grew to be a beautiful woman.
For her sake many knights were to lose their lives.

And this is how Gudrun is described at the end of the Eddic poem Atlakviða:

Fullrœtt er um þetta:
ferr engi svá síðan
brúðr í brynio
brœðr at hefna.
Hon hefir þriggia
þióðkonunga
banorð borit,
biǫrt, áðr sylti.

Translation:

The whole tale is told:
never after her
will any wife go thus in armour
to avenge her brothers.
She caused the death
of three kings
of a nation,
bright lady, before she died.

== Etymology ==
The etymology of Gudrun (Guðrún) is straightforward: it consists of two elements. The first is Proto-Germanic *gunþ-, Old Norse gunnr, meaning battle; it shows the typical North Sea Germanic loss of a nasal before a dental spirant (*Gunþrūn to Guðrún). The second element is Old Norse rún, meaning "secret". On the continent, this name is only attested for an apparently unrelated figure (see Kudrun).

The etymology of Kriemhild is less clear. The second element is clearly -hild, meaning "battle" or "conflict". There is no consensus about the first element though, and it is also variously spelled Grim- and Crem-. One theory derives it from a root *Grīm- (cf. Old English grīma) meaning "mask". Another theory connects it an otherwise unattested root Krēm-. According to both theories, the form Grim- with a short vowel represents an alteration of the original root to be more similar to the word grim, meaning "terrible". Yet another theory derives the first element from a verb similar to Middle High German grimmen, meaning "to rage".

In the Scandinavian tradition, Gudrun's mother is known as Grimhild (Grimhildr), the cognate name to Kriemhild. Victor Millet suggests that the name, along with the mother's wickedness, may derive from the continental tradition.

Scholarly opinion diverges as to which name is more original: either both names are old, the name Gudrun is the original name and the name Kriemhild a later invention, or the name Kriemhild is the original name and the name Gudrun was created to share the same first element as the other Burgundians Gunther (Gunnar) and Guthorm (see Gundomar I).

== Origins ==
Gudrun is believed to have her origins in two historical figures who featured in two originally independent traditions, one about the death of Sigurd and another about the destruction of the Burgundians by the Huns.

In the first instance, Gudrun's quarrel with Brunhild, which results in Sigurd's death at the urging of the latter, is widely thought to have its origins in the quarrel between the two historical Frankish queens, Brunhilda of Austrasia and Fredegund, the latter of whom had Brunhild's husband Sigebert I murdered by his brother Chilperic I, her husband. In the oral tradition, Brunhilda's name has become attached to the murderer rather than the wife. The second element of Fredegund's name, meanwhile, corresponds with the first in Gudrun's.

In the case of the destruction of the Burgundians, Gudrun can be traced to Attila's wife Ildico, who was rumored to have murdered him. The written form Ildico is generally taken to represent the Germanic name *Hildiko, which would be a diminutive form of the name Hild and would thus correspond to the second element in Kriemhild.

== Continental Germanic traditions and attestations ==
=== Nibelungenlied ===
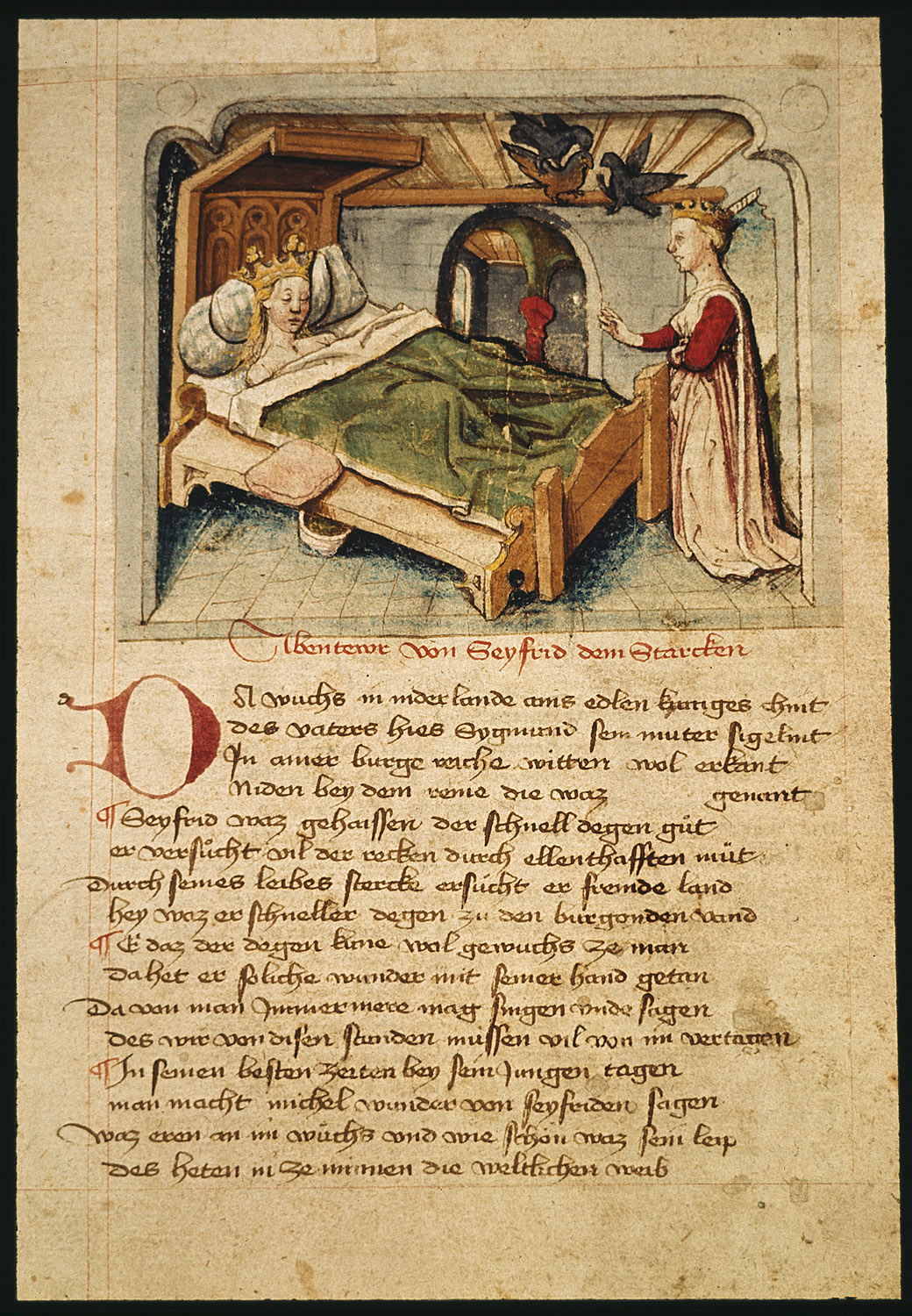
Kriemhild tells her mother Ute of a dream that predicts her tragic love for Siegfried. Hundeshagenscher Kodex.

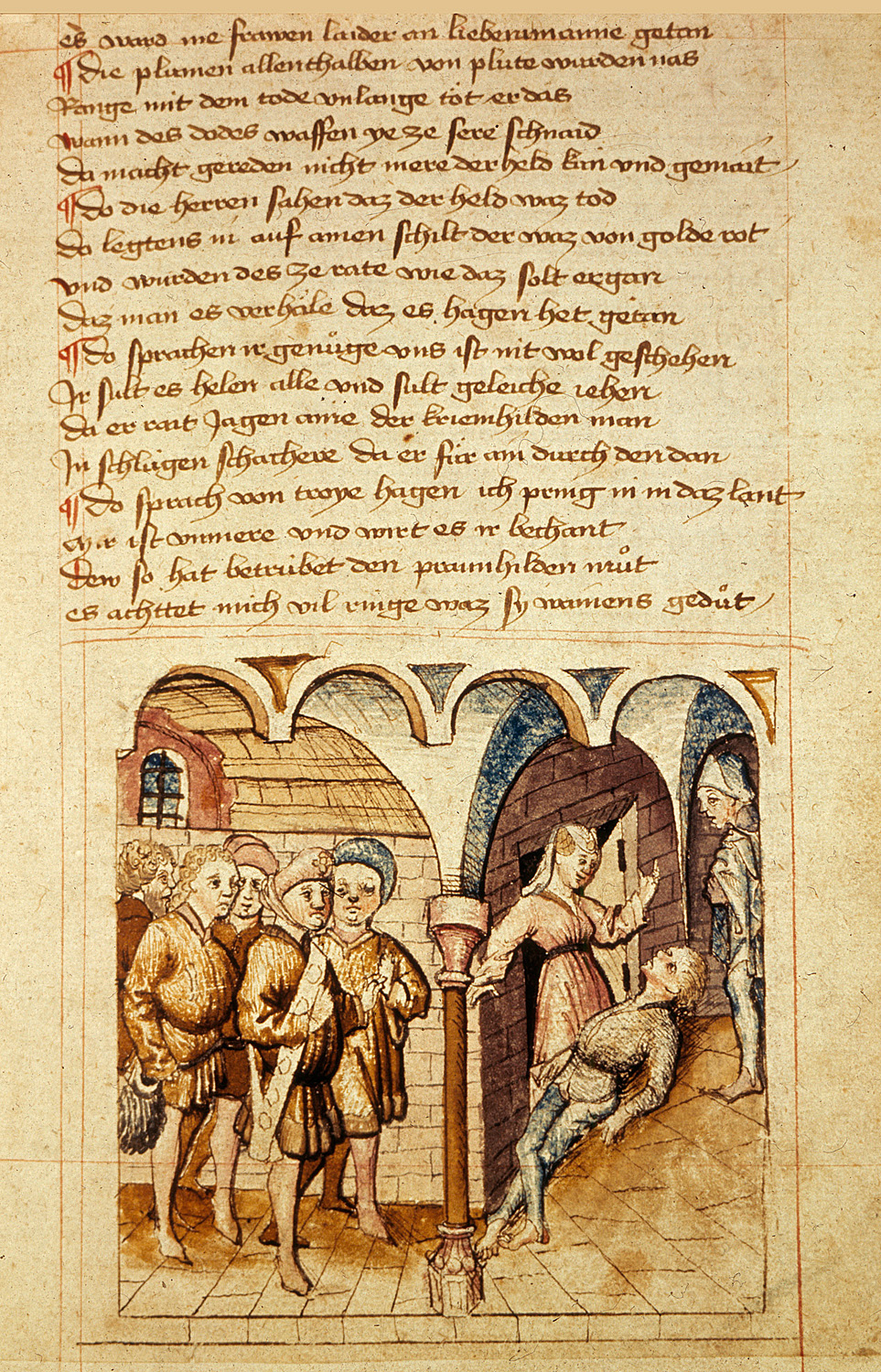
Kriemhild finds Siegfried's corpse in front of her bedroom door. Hundeshagenscher Kodex.

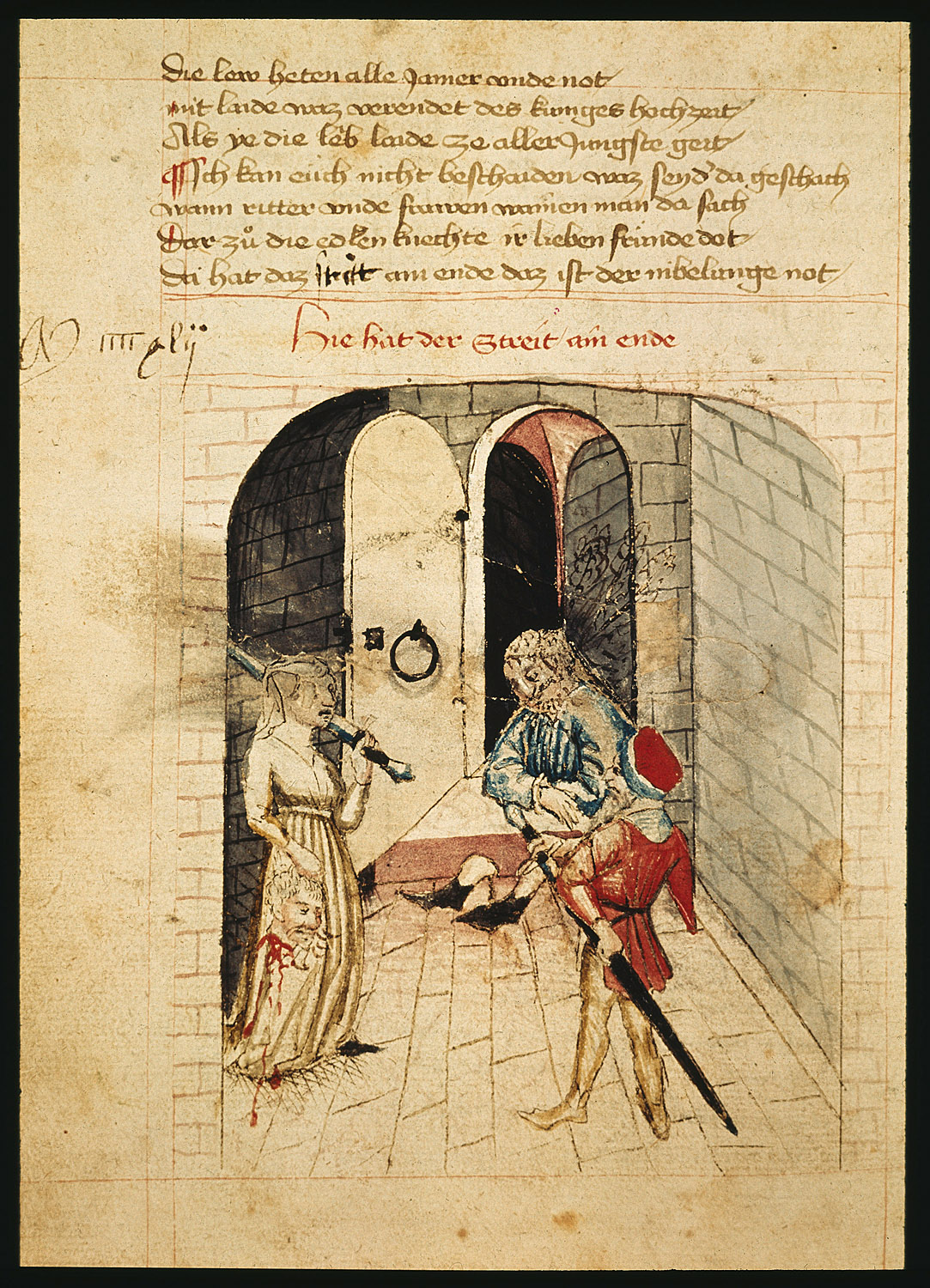
Kriemhild, holding Gunther's head, prepares to kill Hagen with Siegfried's sword while Hildebrand watches. Hundeshagenscher Kodex.

Kriemhild is the main character of the Nibelungenlied (c. 1200): she is the first character to be introduced and the romance ends with her death. The poem is even called "Kriemhild" in at least one manuscript. It has even been argued that the epic represents a sort of Bildungsroman for Kriemhild, as she develops from a relatively mild-manner courtly lady into a forceful and ferocious avenger of her dead husband. Various versions of the text judge her actions differently; in the A and B versions, she is condemned as a vâlendinne (fiend) for her bloody revenge, but the C version emphasizes her love for her dead husband as her motivation and absolves her of most blame.

In the Nibelungenlied, Kriemhild is the daughter of king Dancrat and queen Ute of Burgundy, a kingdom centered around Worms. Her brothers are Gunther, Gernot, and Giselher, with Gunther being the king. The poem opens when Kriemhild has a dream that she raised a falcon only to see it killed by two eagles. Her mother explains to her that this means she will love a man very much, but he will be killed. One day, Siegfried comes to the Burgundian court, intending to woo Kriemhild. The two do not speak for a year, but once Siegfried has helped the Burgundians in a war the two are allowed to see each other for the first time. They fall deeply in love and see each other daily. Once Siegfried has helped Kriemhild's brother king Gunther acquire Brunhild as his bride, Kriemhild and Siegfried are also married. The couple then leaves from Siegfried's own kingdom at Xanten.

Some years pass, and Kriemhild and Siegfried have a son whom they name Gunther. One day, Brunhild, who had been convinced that Siegfried was Gunther's vassal rather than an equal king, convinces Gunther to invite his sister and Siegfried to stay with them at Worms. Initially, Brunhild and Kriemhild get along, but in the private while they are watching a tournament, they soon argue over which of them has the highest ranking husband. Brunhild accuses Kriemhild of being married to a vassal. The queens part in anger. Later, the two queens encounter each other before entering the cathedral at Worms for mass. Brunhild and Kriemhild each insist that they should be allowed to enter the church before the other. Brunhild repeats her accusation that Kriemhild is married to a vassal publicly. Kriemhild then declares that Siegfried, and not Gunther, has taken Brunhild's virginity, displaying Brunhild apparent proof. Kriemhild then enters the church before Brunhild.

Siegfried is forced to publicly deny the accusation to Gunther, and beats Kriemhild to punish her. Brunhild is not satisfied, however, and Hagen convinces Gunther to have Siegfried murdered. Under the pretext that he wants to protect Siegfried, Hagen convinces Kriemhild to reveal the only spot where impenetrable Siegfried may be wounded. Once Siegfried is murdered while hunting with Hagen and Gunther, his body is thrown in front of Kriemhild's bedroom door. Kriemhild quickly realizes that Siegfried was murdered by Gunther and Hagen. Kriemhild sees to Siegfried's burial and refuses to return to Xanten with Siegfried's father, instead remaining in Worms near her family and Siegfried's tomb. Eventually, Gunther and his brothers are able to reconcile with Kriemhild, but she refuses to forgive Hagen. Kriemhild has the hoard of the Nibelungen, which she has inherited after Siegfried's death, brought to Worms. She uses the hoard to acquire warriors; Hagen, realizing that she is dangerous, conspires to steal the hoard and sink it in the Rhine.

Thirteen years later, king Etzel of the Huns seeks Kriemhild's hand in marriage, and she reluctantly agrees. Thirteen years after her arrival in Etzel's kingdom, she convinces Etzel to invite her brothers to a feast. Gunther agrees and the Burgundians and their vassals arrive at Etzel's court. Kriemhild greets her brothers but mockingly asks Hagen whether he has brought her what he stole at Worms. Later, Kriemhild confronts Hagen with a group of Huns, and Hagen provokes her by bragging that he killed Siegfried. None of the Huns is brave enough to attack, and the Burgundians prevent an attack that Kriemhild had planned for that night. The next day, Kriemhild convinces Etzel's brother Bloedelin to attack the Burgundians' supplies; this occurs while Etzel, Kriemhild, and their son Ortlieb are seated in the hall with Burgundians. Upon hearing of the attack, Hagen decapitates the Hunnish prince. Fighting erupts, but Dietrich von Bern arranges for Kriemhild and Etzel to leave the hall. Kriemhild later demands that Gunther surrender Hagen to her, but he refuses: she then has the hall set on fire. Eventually, Dietrich von Bern captures Gunther and Hagen as the last survivors in the hall, handing them over to Kriemhild. Kriemhild separates the two and demands that Hagen give back to her what he has taken from her. Hagen says he cannot tell her where the hoard is as long as his lord Gunther lives; Kriemhild then has Gunther decapitated. Hagen then reveals that the hoard is in the Rhine; Kriemhild takes Siegfried's sword, which Hagen had stolen, and beheads him with it herself. Dietrich's mentor Hildebrand, outraged that a woman has killed a great warrior, then hacks Kriemhild to pieces.

=== Nibelungenklage ===
Although Kriemhild does not appear as a living character in the Nibelungenklage, the sequel to the Nibelungenlied, the poem nevertheless goes to great lengths to absolve her of blame for the catastrophe of the Nibelungenlied. According to the Nibelungenklage, Kriemhild was acting out of true love for Siegfried and the true treachery was that of Hagen. This is underlined by having Hildebrand specifically blame Hagen for the disaster, calling him a vâlant (fiend), the male counterpart to the accusation that Kriemhild is a vâlandinne (fiend).

=== Þiðrekssaga ===
Although the Þiðrekssaga (c. 1250) is written in Old Norse, the majority of the material is translated from German (particularly Low German) oral tales, as well as possibly some from German written sources such as the Nibelungenlied. Therefore, it is included here.

In the Thidrekssaga, Grimhild (Kriemhild) is the daughter of king Aldrian of Niflungaland and Oda, sister of king Gunnar (Gunther), Gisler (Giselher), and Gernoz (Gernot), and half sister of Högni (Hagen). When Sigurd (Siegfried) comes to Gunnar's kingdom one day, he marries Grimhild and suggests that Gunnar marry Brunhild. Some time later, Grimhild and Brunhild argue over precedent in the king's hall. Brunhild accuses Grimhild of not even being married to a man of noble birth, whereupon Grimhild reveals that Sigurd and not Gunnar took Brunhild's virginity, showing a ring that Sigurd had given her as proof. Brunhild then agitates for Sigurd's murder; once Grimhild's brothers have murdered Sigurd, they place his corpse in her bed.

Some time later, Atli (Etzel) woos Grimhild to be his new wife. Seven years later Grimhild convinces Atli to invite the Burgundians (called Niflungs) to visit her by mentioning the hoard of the Nibelungen which her brothers had stolen from her. Atli is seized by greed for the hoard and agrees. Once the Burgundians arrive, Grimhild demands the hoard from them, but Högni replies that it was left behind. Grimhild attempts to convince Atli's brother Bloedel and Thidrek (Dietrich von Bern) to help her take revenge, but both refuse. Finally, she provokes a fight by bringing her and Atli's son into the hall, seating him across from Högni, and telling the son to hit Högni. Högni reacts to a second blow by cutting off the prince's head, leading to a terrible massacre. After severe fighting, Gunnar is captured, and Grimhild tells Atli to throw him in a tower full of snakes. Högni now leads the Burgundians, who lock themselves in the king's hall. Grimhild orders the hall set on fire, and in the following battle Gisler and Gernoz die. Grimhild sticks a piece of flaming wood into her dead brothers' mouths to see if they are dead, causing an enraged Thidrek to kill her.

The author of the saga has made a number of changes to create a more or less coherent story out of the many oral and possibly written sources that he used to create the saga. The author mentions alternative Scandinavian versions of many of these same tales, and appears to have changed some details to match the stories known by his Scandinavian audience. The saga's version of the downfall of the Burgundians represents a unique mix of elements known from the Norse and continental traditions.

=== Rosengarten zu Worms ===
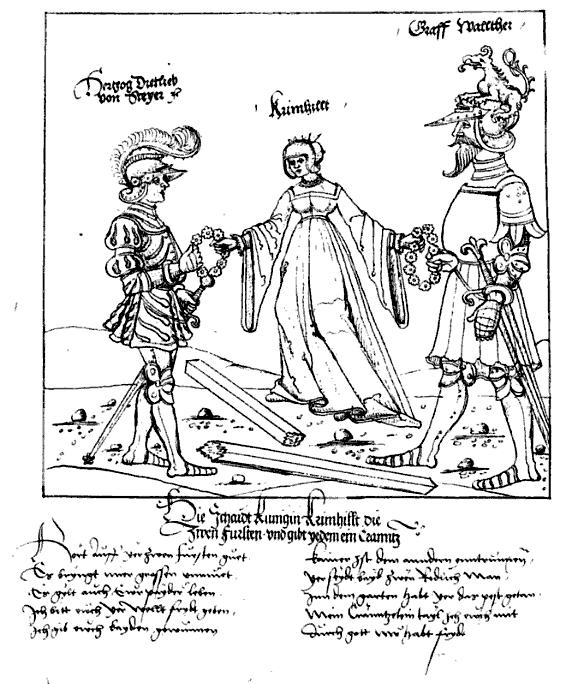
Dietleib and Walther both receive a garland of roses from Kriemhild. Image from a text of the Berlin Rosengarten play, SB Berlin mgf 800, Bl. 2v.

In the Rosengarten zu Worms (c. 1250), Kriemhild is the daughter of king Gibeche. She possesses a rose garden that is guarded by twelve heroes, including her fiancé, Siegfried. Desiring to see whether Siegfried can beat Dietrich von Bern in combat, she challenges Dietrich to bring twelve of his own heroes for a day of tournaments in the rose garden. The winner will receive a garland and a kiss from her as a reward. Dietrich accepts the challenge, and the heroes come to Worms. Eventually, all of the Burgundian heroes are defeated, including Siegfried, who flees to Kriemhild's lap in fear when Dietrich starts breathing fire. Dietrich's warrior Ilsan, a monk, punishes Kriemhild for her haughtiness in challenging Dietrich by demanding so many kisses from Kriemhild that his rough beard causes her face to bleed. In one version of the poem, Hagen curses Kriemhild for having provoked the combat.

The poem takes a highly critical judgment of Kriemhild. As in the A and B versions of the Nibelungenlied, she is called a vâlandinne (fiend) and she derives great joy from watching the knights fight in at times brutal combat.

The name of Kriemhild's father, Gibeche, corresponds to Gjúki in the Scandinavian tradition, and is also found in the Lied vom Hürnen Seyfrid and Heldenbuch-Prosa (see below); this shows the Rosengarten's connection to an oral tradition outside of the Nibelungenlied, despite the Rosengarten's obvious knowledge of the earlier poem.

=== Heldenbuch-Prosa ===
The Heldenbuch-Prosa, first found in the 1480 Heldenbuch of Diebolt von Hanowe and afterwards contained in printings until 1590, is considered one of the most important attestations of a continued oral tradition outside of the Nibelungenlied, with many details agreeing with the Thidrekssaga.

In the Heldenbuch-Prosa, Kriemhild is the daughter of king Gibeche and married to Siegfried. She arranges for the disaster at Etzel's hall in order to take vengeance on Dietrich von Bern for having killed Siegfried in the rose garden. She provokes the fighting by having her and Etzel's son brought into the hall and having the child provoke Hagen, who kills him. This leads to an outbreak of hostilities in which many heroes die. When Dietrich takes Gunther and Hagen prisoner, she cuts off their heads, causing Dietrich to cut her to pieces.

=== Das Lied vom Hürnen Seyfrid ===
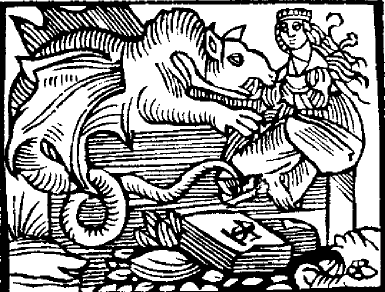
The dragon lays its head in Kriemhild's lap. Woodcut for an early modern printing of Das Lied vom Hürnen Seyfrid.

In the late medieval/early modern heroic ballad Das Lied vom Hürnen Seyfrid, Kriemhild is the daughter of king Gybich and sister of Gunther, Gyrnot (Gernot), and Hagen. The name Gybich agrees with the Rosengarten zu Worms and corresponds to the Old Norse Gjúki, and the fact that Hagen is one of Kriemhild's brothers accords with the Thidrekssaga and the Scandinavian tradition as well. This is taken as evidence that these elements of the tradition existed in oral story-telling into the late Middle Ages.

In the middle of the ballad, a dragon abducts Kriemhild from her home in Worms. The dragon holds Kriemhild captive for years in his lair of mount Trachenstein (dragon stone), treating her well. One day it lays its head in her lap and transforms into a man, explaining that she needs to stay with him for five years. After that time he will marry her and they will travel to hell together. Kriemhild prays to avoid this fate. Finally, Siegfried (Seyfrid) arrives to save her, but the dragon appears. The dragon forces Siegfried and Kriemhild to flee into the depths of the mountain, where they find the treasure of the Nibelungen and a sword that can cut through the dragon's skin. Siegfried defeats the dragon, and Kriemhild and Siegfried return to Worms, where they are married and Siegfried rules together with Kriemhild's brothers. Her brothers, however, resent how powerful Siegfried has become and after seven years, they murder him.

It has been suggested that Siegfried's liberation of Kriemhild may be a repurposing of a lost German story about Brunhild, though this is far from certain. The Nibelungenlied version m includes a version of Siegfried's freeing of Kriemhild from a dragon, meaning the legend developed by 1400. The earliest surviving copy of the ballad itself is from 1530.

=== Other traditions and attestations ===
The ninth-century anonymous Saxon poet known as Poeta Saxo records that Attila's wife killed him to avenge the death of her father.

The Danish historian Saxo Grammaticus records in his Gesta Danorum that a Saxon minstrel tried unsuccessfully to warn the Danish prince Canute Lavard of the betrayal of his cousin Magnus the Strong by singing of "the famous treachery of Grimhild against her brothers" (notissimam Grimildae erga fratres perfidiam).

The phrase "Kriemhilden hôchzît" (Kriemhild's festival) is attested in other medieval German works to denote an especially bloody battle.

In a song of the mid-thirteenth-century wandering lyric poet Der Marner, "whom Kriemhild betrayed" (wen Kriemhilt verriet) is mentioned as a popular story that the German courtly public enjoyed hearing, along with tales of Sigurd's death and the hoard of the Nibelungs.

The Hungarian chronicler Simon of Kéza (late thirteenth-century) records that Attila the Hun was killed by his wife Kriemhild.

== Scandinavian traditions and attestations ==
=== Gesta Danorum ===
The Danish historian Saxo Grammaticus records a version of the story of Jorumrek (Ermanaric)'s death that includes Gudrun (as Guthruna) in Latin in his Gesta Danorum. In this version, in which "Jarmericus" is a Danish king, Gudrun appears as a powerful sorceress who casts spells on the weapons of the brothers coming to avenge Svanhild's death that make them invincible.

Saxo probably completed his history before 1208, making this the earliest version of the Scandinavian tradition to have survived and roughly contemporary with the Nibelungenlied. Victor Millet nevertheless believes that Saxo is of little value as a source for authentic heroic traditions, as he appears to have thoroughly altered whatever sources he used.

=== Prose Edda ===
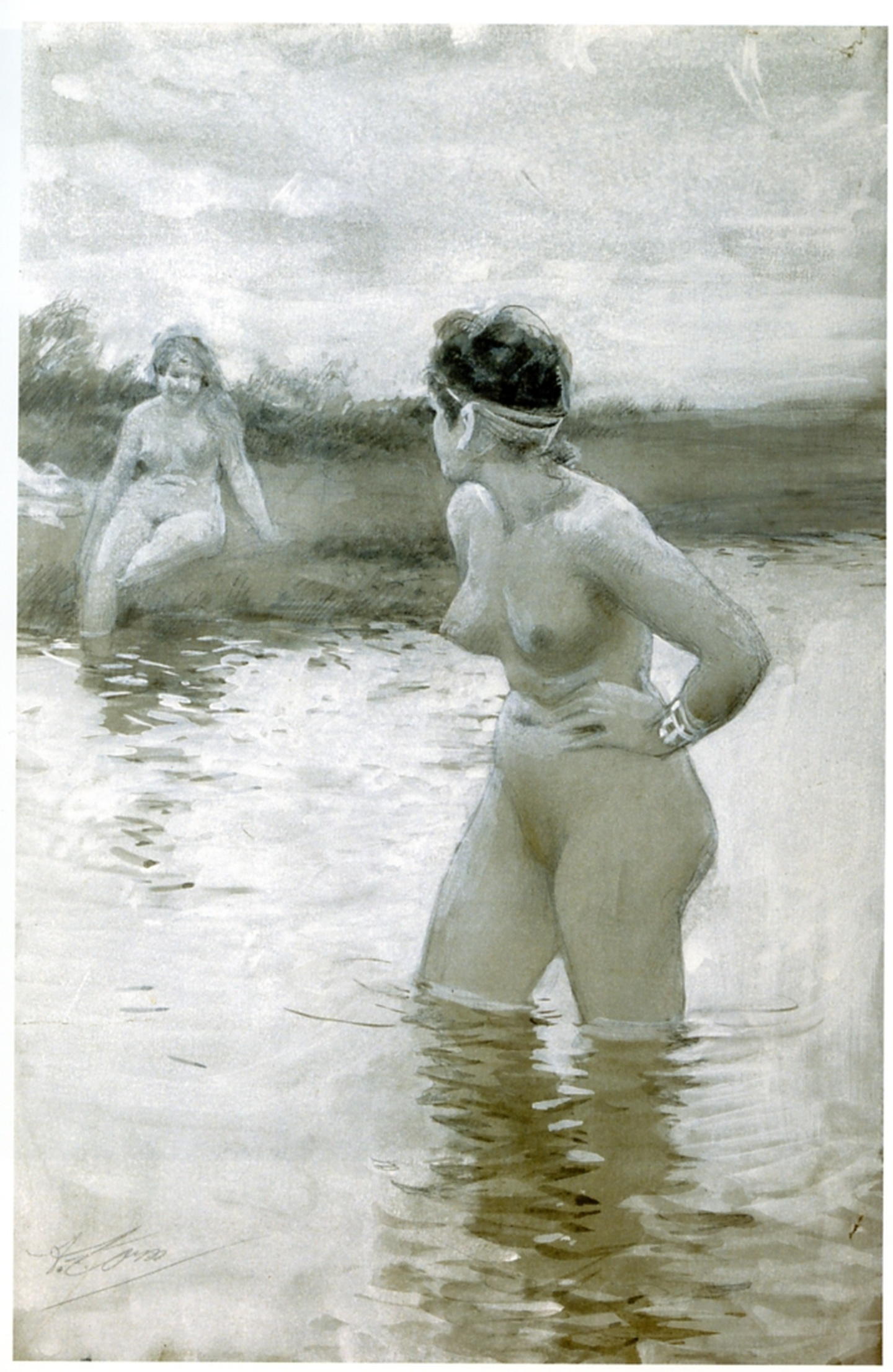
Brynhild och Gudrun by Anders Zorn, 1893.

The so-called Prose Edda of Snorri Sturluson is the earliest attestation of the full Scandinavian version of Gudrun's life, dating to around 1220. Snorri tells the story of Gudrun in several chapters of the section of the poem called Skáldskaparsmál. His presentation of the story is very similar to that found in the Völsunga saga (see below), but is considerably shorter.

Gudrun is introduced as the daughter of Gjúki and Grimhild, full sister to Gunnar and Högni, and half-sister to Guthorm. Gudrun marries Sigurd when he comes to Gjúki's kingdom. When Sigurd returns from aiding Gunnar in his wooing of Brunhild, Sigurd and Gudrun have two children, a son named Sigmund and a daughter named Svanhild. Some time later, Gudrun and Brunhild have a quarrel while washing their hair in a river: Brunhild says that she cannot have the water that touched Gudrun's hair touch hers, for she is married to the braver husband. The fight leads Gudrun to reveal that it was Sigurd in Gunnar's shape who rode through the flames to woo Brunhild, producing a ring that Sigurd had taken from Brunhild as proof. This knowledge leads Brunhild to agitate for Sigurd's murder, which is performed by Gudrun's half-brother Guthorm, who also kills the young Sigmund.

Following this, Gudrun is married to king Atli (Attila). When Atli invites Gudrun's brothers and kills them for their gold, Gudrun kills her two sons by Atli. She makes their skulls into drinking goblets and cooks their hearts, giving them to Atli to eat. She then tells Atli what she has done, and later kills Atli together with Högni's son. She then burns down the hall.

Afterwards, Gudrun tries to drown herself in the sea, but she washes ashore in the land of King Jonak. Jonak marries her and has three sons with her, Sorli, Hamdir, and Erp. Svanhild, Sigurd's daughter, is also raised there, before being married to king Jormunrek. When Jormunrek kills Svanhild for adultery, Gudrun tells her sons to kill him, giving them special weapons that could not be pierced by iron. The sons die in the attempt, leading to the extinction of Gjúki's line.

=== Poetic Edda ===
The Poetic Edda, a collection of heroic and mythological Nordic poems, appears to have been compiled around 1270 in Iceland, and assembles mythological and heroic songs of various ages. As elsewhere in the Scandinavian tradition, Gudrun is portrayed as the sister of Gunnar and Högni. Depending on the poem Guthorm is either her full brother, step-brother, or half-brother. A sister Gullrönd also appears in one poem.

Generally, none of the poems in the collection is thought to be older than 900 and some appear to have been written in the thirteenth century. It is also possible that apparently old poems have been written in an archaicizing style and that apparently recent poems are reworkings of older material, so that reliable dating is impossible.

==== Grípisspá ====
In Grípisspá, a prophecy that Sigurd receives about his future life and deeds, it is mentioned that Gudrun will be his wife, and that Brunhild will feel insulted by this. The prophecy ends shortly after describing Gudrun's grief and blaming her mother Grimhild for the whole debacle.

The poem is probably not very old.

==== Brot af Sigurðarkviðu ====
Brot af Sigurðarkviðu is only preserved fragmentarily: the surviving part of the poem tells the story of Sigurd's murder. The poem briefly shows Gudrun's surprise and grief at Sigurd's death, as well as her hostility to Brunhild. She is portrayed as a less important character than Brunhild. The lost part of the poem probably shows Gudrun to reveal Sigurd and Gunnar's deception in the wooing.

==== Guðrúnarkviða I ====
In Guðrúnarkviða I, Gudrun lies besides Sigurd's corpse but is unable to weep. Two other women attempt to comfort her by telling of their own grief, but it is only when Gudrun's sister Gullrönd uncovers Sigurd's body and tells her to kiss it that she is able to weep. Gudrun now accuses Gunnar of the murder and denies him any right to Sigurd's treasure. She warns that she will avenge her husband. It is implied that if Gudrun had been unable to weep, she may have died.

The poem focuses entirely on Gudrun's grief at the death of Sigurd, omitting almost all details surrounding his death. The three women, including Gudrun's sister Gullrönd, are probably inventions of the poet.

==== Sigurðarkviða hin skamma ====
Sigurðarkviða hin skamma retells the story of Sigurd's life from his arrival at Gunnar's court to his murder. Gudrun plays a passive role in the poem. She is shown to wake up in a pool of blood from the dying Sigurd, who then makes a short speech to her blaming Brunhild, predicting the murder of their son, assuring her that he has not slept with Brunhild, and noting that he brothers still live. After this, she disappears from the poem and is only mentioned by Brunhild.

==== Dráp Niflunga ====
The Dráp Niflunga is a short prose section connecting the death of Sigurd to the following poems about the Burgundians (Niflungs) and Atli (Attila). Atli, who is Brunhild's brother, blames Gunnar for Brunhild's death, and in order to placate him Gunnar marries Gudrun to Atli. Gudrun must be given a magic potion to make her forget about Sigurd first. Some time later Atli invites Gunnar and Högni intending to betray them and take their gold. Gudrun attempts to warn her brothers, but they come anyway. After they are taken prisoner by Atli, she asks her sons to intervene with their father on Gunnar and Högni's behalf, but they refuse.

==== Guðrúnarkviða II ====
In Guðrúnarkviða II, Gudrun is at Atli's court. She laments of her fate to Thiodrek (Þjódrekr, i.e. Dietrich von Bern and tells the story of her tribulations leading to her marriage to Atli. She recounts how Sigurd was killed and how she then wandered to Denmark, where she stayed with King Half for three and a half years. Then her family came for her, and her mother Grimhild gave her a potion to forget her sorrow. Then she was forced to marry Atli. One night, Atli awoke and told Gudrun that he had had a dream that she would kill him and cause him to eat his sons. Gudrun interprets the dream in a way that makes it seem harmless.

The poem is probably one of the most recent in the Poetic Edda. Its account of Sigurd's death generally follow the account in Brot af Sigurðarkviðu, but ignores Brunhild and includes the detail that Gudrun went into the woods to mourn over Sigurd's body. The inclusion of the figure of Thiodrek points to continental influence on the poem. The last stanza is incomplete, and scholars debate whether the poem originally also included Gudrun's killing of Atli and his sons.

Victor Millet notes that the detail of the potion of forgetting helps explain why Gudrun does not seek to avenge Sigurd; he connects this to a possible attempt to discount the continental version of the story, which the poet appears to have known. The use of the name Grimhild for her mother, the cognate name for Kriemhild, and that character's manifest wickedness may also derive from the continental tradition.

==== Guðrúnarkviða III ====
In Guðrúnarkviða III, Atli's concubine Herkja accuses Gudrun of sleeping with Thiodrek. Gudrun denies the charges and engages in an ordeal of hot water to prove her innocence. To perform the ordeal, she puts her hand into the kettle of boiling water, and because she is innocent, she is unscathed. Herkja is then forced to perform the same ordeal and burns herself. As a punishment, she is killed by being drowned in a bog.

Like Guðrúnarkviða II, Guðrúnarkviða III shows knowledge of continental traditions with the figure of Thiodrek. In addition, Herkja corresponds to the German Helche (in the Thidrekssaga, Erka), the first wife of Etzel (Atli) in the continental tradition. She only appears here in the Poetic Edda. Michael Curschmann argues that the poem is a transformation of a continental Germanic legend in which Dietrich (Thjodrek) is accused of sleeping with Etzel's wife Helche (Herkja), with whom he had a close relationship; an Old Norse poet then made Herkja into a concubine and accuser and made Gudrun into the accused.

Although the poem is placed before the poems about Atli's death in the codex, references to Gudrun being without kin seem to indicate that it takes place after the death of the Burgundians.

==== Atlakviða ====
In Atlakviða, Atli invites Gudrun's brothers Högni and Gunnar to his hall with the intent of killing them. The brothers come, although Gudrun has sent them a warning. Once Gunnar and Högni are dead, Gudrun offers Atli a drink and invites him and the Huns to a feast. After all are drunk, she reveals that Atli has eaten his sons, kills him, then sets the hall on fire, killing everyone within, including herself.

Atlakviða is commonly supposedly to be one of the oldest poems in the Poetic Edda, possibly dating from the ninth century. Gudrun feeding Atli his sons may derive from the antique story of Tereus and Procne, however. The poem is particularly notable in that Sigurd is not mentioned at all.

==== Atlamál hin groenlenzku ====
Atlamál hin groenlenzku tells the same story as Atlakviða with several important differences. Gudrun tries to warn her brothers of Atli's betrayal, but they decide to come anyway. Gudrun greets her brothers when they arrive and tries to negotiate between them and Atli, but when she sees that this is not possible she fights together with them until she is captured. Gudrun and Atli then accuse each other of causing the slaughter. Atli kills Gunnar and Högni and then tells Gudrun. She curses him, and he offers her some form of compensation, which she refuses. Gudrun pretends to have reconciled herself with the situation, but secretly kills her sons and feeds them to Atli. She tells Atli what he has eaten then kills Atli with the help of Högni's son Hniflung. While he dies, Atli claims to have treated Gudrun well and accuses her of being cruel. Gudrun defends herself and promises to bury Atli appropriately, and tries to kill herself.

This version of the poem makes the destruction of the Burgundians look like the result of a feud between Atli and Gudrun; Atli is even said to execute Gunnar and Högni to hurt his wife.

==== Guðrúnarhvöt ====
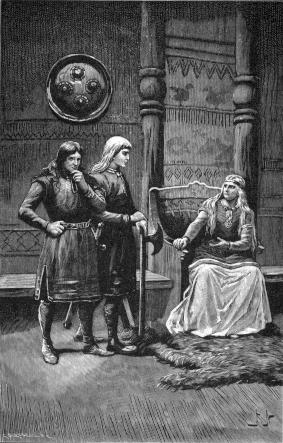
Gudrun agitating her sons.

Guðrúnarhvöt is proceeded by a brief prose interlude that explains that tried to drown herself in the sea after killing Atli, but was instead taken to the land of King Jonak, who married her and with whom she had three sons, Hamdir, Sorli, and Erp, and where she also raises Svanhild, her daughter with Sigurd. Svanhild is married to Jormunrek, who later kills her on suspicion of jealousy.

The poem proper starts after Gudrun has learned of Svanhild's death: she stirs up her three sons to kill Jormunrek and avenge their sister. The brothers agree, warning her, however, they will surely die. This leads Gudrun to tell them of her own woes in life. Once she is left alone, Gudrun calls for death and hopes that Sigurd will ride back from Hel to see her. They will then burn together on the same funeral pyre.

==== Hamðismál ====
Gudrun appears briefly at the beginning of Hamðismál: she encourages her sons to avenge Svanhild, which they reluctantly agree to do.

This lay is often supposed to be the oldest in the Poetic Edda, but more recent scholarship suggests it may actually be fairly recent.

=== Völsunga saga ===
The Völsunga saga follows the plot given in the Poetic Edda fairly closely, although there is no indication that the author knew the other text. The author appears to have been working in Norway and to have known the Thidrekssaga, and therefore the Völsunga Saga is dated to sometime in the second half of the thirteenth century.

In the saga, Gudrun is the daughter of Gjuki, sister to Gunnar and Högni, and Guthorm. Gudrun is introduced to the saga having a bad dream; she chooses to go to Brunhild to have this dream interpreted. Brunhild explains that Gudrun will marry Sigurd, even though he is betrothed to Brunhild, and that Gudrun will afterwards lose him due to conflict. When Sigurd comes to the court, Gudrun's mother Grimhild gives Sigurd a potion to forget his betrothal to Brunhild, and he marries Gudrun. Sigurd then helps Gunnar woo Brunhild, using a spell taught them by Grimhild, and for a time Brunhild and Gudrun share Gjuki's court.

One day Gudrun and Brunhild quarrel while washing their hair; Brunhild insists that her husband Gunnar is a higher-ranking man than Sigurd. This causes Gudrun to reveal that it was Sigurd in Gunnar's shape who won Brunhild, and she shows Brunhild a ring that Brunhild had given Sigurd as proof. The queens continue their quarrel in the king's hall the next day. Brunhild then persuades Gunnar and Högni to have Sigurd killed, claiming that Sigurd slept with her. The murder is carried out by their younger brother Guthorm. Guthorm attacks Sigurd while he is asleep in bed with Gudrun; Sigurd is mortally wounded, but kills Guthorm. He then assures Gudrun that he never deceived Gunnar and dies. Gudrun then cries out loudly, which Brunhild answers with a loud laugh.

Gudrun afterwards flees to the Danish king Half, but is later retrieved by her family. Grimhild gives her daughter a potion to make her forget her anger against her brothers, then convinces a reluctant Gudrun to marry Atli. Atli and Gudrun are not happily married, and Atli soon desires the gold of Gudrun's brothers. He invites them to his hall intending to kill them for the gold. Gudrun warns them, but the warning is ignored. When the brothers arrive, Gudrun first attempts to mediate between the two sides, but afterwards fights with her brothers until they are captured and then killed. During the preparations for the funeral feast for her brothers, Gudrun kills Atli's sons. She feeds their flesh to Atli. Then she kills Atli in his bed with the help of Högni's son Niflung. Finally, they set the palace on fire and kill everyone inside.

Gudrun now attempts to drown herself, but she is instead washed up in the land of king Jonak, who marries her. They have three sons, Hamdir, Sorli, and Erp. Gudrun's daughter with Sigurd, Svanhild, is also raised at Jonak's court. Svanhild marries King Jormunrek, but he kills her on suspicion of adultery. Gudrun then rallies her sons to avenge their half-sister, giving them armor that cannot be cut through by iron.

In later folklore, Gudrun is found in a Norwegian version of a ballad about count Gunseli (Jormunrek, otherwise in Danish version known as Gesserlin or Faroese Jansalin). The ballad is about wedding of Svanhild and Jormunrek, but all the characters except of Sigurd have different names, such as Gudrun is called Jorunn Joklekåpa. A woman character with the same name does also appear in the ballade about king Herredag, where Jorunn is an enemy of Sigurd, Thor and king Herredag.

Moltke Moe and Sophus Bugge note textual parallels between the ballad of Gunseli and the ballad of Torekallsvisa. They also suggest that the first part of Jorunn's second name, Joklekåpa, is a mix between names of Gjuki and Budli, Brunhild's father in the Völsunga saga.

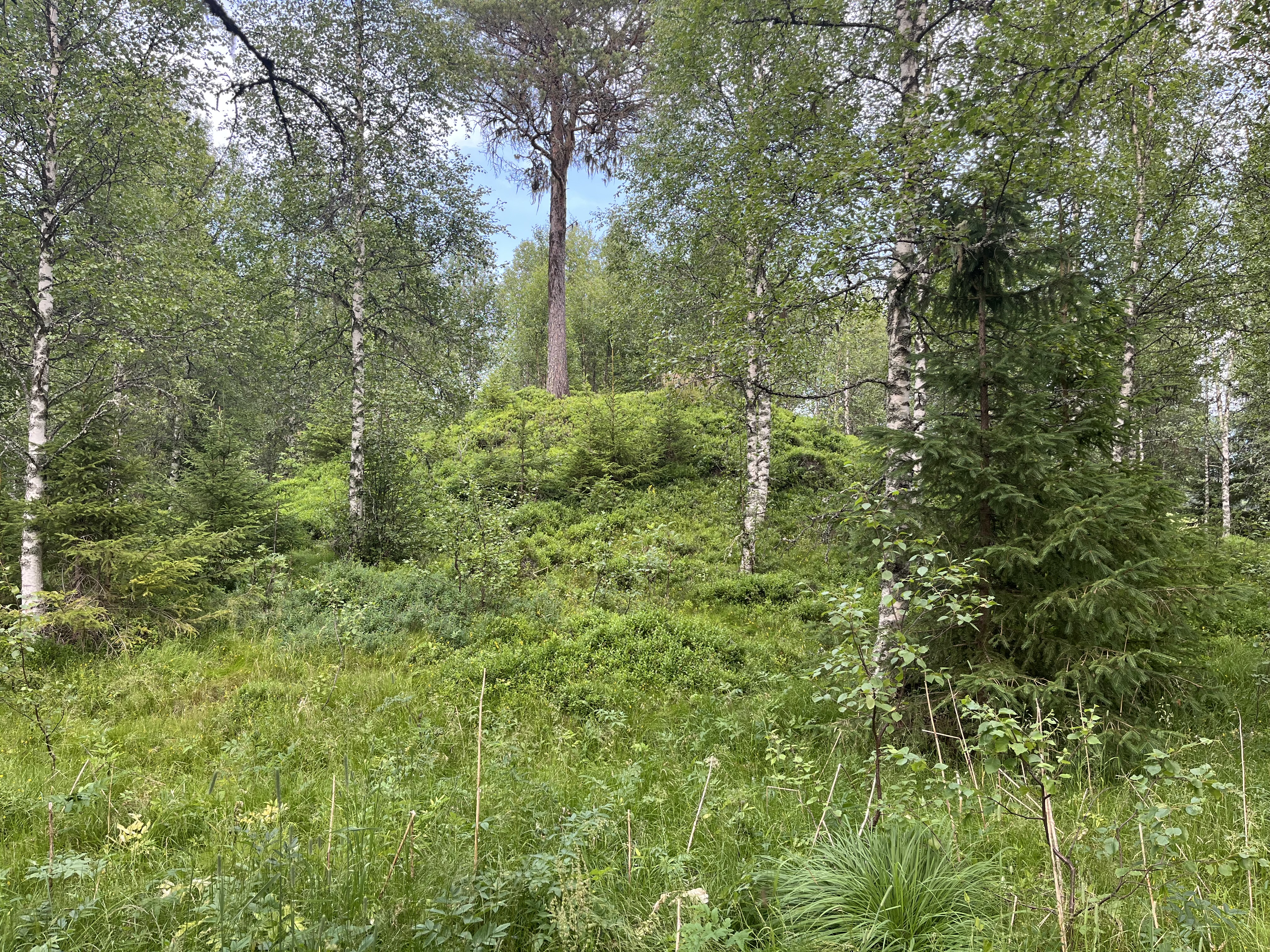
The burial mound of Jorunn Joklekåpa in Vinje Municipality.

The location of the events in the Herredag’s ballad may differ depending on region where the different versions of the ballad were recorded. One of coastal versions says that Herredag was king of Dåreid, while his enemy wasa king of Gautland in Åpta. Rikard Berge on other hand mentions Jorunn Joklekåpa as a queen of Gauksland (now in Vinje Municipality), and her husband is called Gause, while their enemy is a king of Øvrebø hillfort on the other side of the lake Vinjevatn.

=== Wild Hunt ===
In the Norwegian legend of the Wild Hunt, Gudrun is referred to as Guro Rysserova ("Gudrun Horse-tail"), who leads the so-called Asgard Ride, "Oskoreia".

Oskoreia, as well as the so-called Lussireia, is said to be happening around Christmas. In a Scandinavian ballad called "Sigurd Svein", which has a similar story as in Grípisspá, but in the end Sigurd Svein meets Gunnar and Gudrun, in the Norwegian version called Guro, and they take him into the Oskoreia.

According to Rikard Berge, the leaders of Wild Hunt in the legends of north-western Telemark were Guro Rysserova and Sigurd Angerstøyl, because Sigurd was said to be from Angerstøyl seter, while his uncle is probably the same character as one of the legendary rulers of Haukeli in the same region.

This way, in Gudrun in the folklore and songs of north-western Telemark became two different characters: the malicious troll queen Jorunn Joklekåpa and the Wild Hunt leaderess Guro Rysserova. Both of them are depicted as evil characters.

Guro Rysserova is also known in eastern Telemark, where she, according to a local legend noted by Landstad, has kidnapped a young man in Klevar village (now in Midt-Telemark Municipality) and took him into the Oskoreia. Then, every thursday the Oskoreia returned, and the locals threw a knife over the head of the man, what would save him, but every time he rode his horse to fast, and the third thursday his brother wasn’t willing to throw the knife in order to inherit his property, so eventually the man got lost forever.

== Theories about the development of the Gudrun figure ==
Based on Atlakviða, most scholars believe that the destruction of the Burgundians and the murder of Sigurd were originally separate traditions. Gudrun's two names may result from the merging of two different figures, one who was the wife of Sigurd, and one who was the brother of the Burgundians killed by Attila.

The first attestation of Kriemhild or Gudrun, however, is the Nibelungenlied. This is also the first secure attestation of a combined legend of the death of Sigurd and the destruction of the Burgundians.

=== Role in the destruction of Burgundians ===
The destruction of the Burgundian kingdom derives from the destruction of a historical Burgundian kingdom, ruled by king Gundicharius (Gunther) and located on the Rhine, by the Roman general Flavius Aetius in 436/437, possibly with the help of Hunnish mercenaries. The downfall of this kingdom was blamed on Attila and combined with his death at the hands of his wife at some early point in the development of the legend.

Scholars are generally in agreement that Gudrun's original role in the destruction of Burgundians was that of the Scandinavian tradition, in which she avenges her brothers. Her role then altered in the continental tradition once the story of the destruction of the Burgundians became attached to the story of Sigurd's murder. These changes occurred sometime before the composition of the Nibelungenlied (c. 1200), the first text to securely attest either development.

Jan-Dirk Müller, however, argues that we cannot know for sure which version of Gudrun's role is more original, as neither resembles the actual historical destruction of the Burgundians or the end of Etzel's kingdom. He suggests that the change in roles may be because of the continental tradition's more favorable view of Attila.

=== Attachment to the legend of Ermanaric and Svanhild ===
The attachment of Gudrun's legend to that of Ermanaric (Jǫrmunrek) and Svanhild is a Scandinavian innovation that brings this legend into direct contact with the more famous legend of Sigurd. Edward Haymes and Susan Samples believe that it is a relatively late development. Other scholars date it to the tenth century, however, on the basis of a version of the story cited in the Skaldic poem Ragnarsdrápa: the narrator there refers to Ermanaric's killers as descendants of Gjúki, Gudrun's father. This poem is attributed to the poet Bragi Boddason, who lived in the tenth century, although other scholars date it instead to around 1000 and believe that the attribution to Bragi is incorrect.

== In popular culture ==
- In 1924, Fritz Lang and Thea von Harbou produced Die Nibelungen: Kriemhilds Rache (Die Nibelungen: Kriemhild's Revenge). Kriemhild was played by actress Margarete Schön.
- In the 2005 TV epic Ring of the Nibelungs, American actress Alicia Witt played Kriemhild in an adaptation of the Nibelungenlied saga. In this version she willingly gives up the Nibelungs' ring and gold after Siegfried's death, having realized the deadly curse they bring on all who would try to claim them for their own.

== See also ==
- Medea
- Procne
