= Aladar Rado =

Hungarian composer (1882–1914)

Aladár Radó (26 December 1882, in Budapest – 7 September 1914, in Boljevci near Belgrade) was a Hungarian composer of classical music.

== Life and work ==
Aladar Rado first studied under Hans Koessler (composition) at the Franz Liszt Academy of Music since 1904 with fellow students like Bela Bartok and Zoltan Kodaly. He later continued his compositional studies under Leo Weiner. He was awarded the Hungarian State fellowship, the Franz-Liszt-fellowship of Budapest, a Bayreuth fellowship, and the Franz-Joseph-fellowship which allowed him to move to Berlin. There he continued to compose and also worked for the theatres of Max Reinhardt.

In 1914 Aladar Rado was the designated principal conductor of the Reinhard Theatres with a contract starting on 1 September. But in July 1914 the World War I broke out and Aladar Rado enlisted for military service and was sent as a reserve officer to the front line in Serbia. There he was killed in action only a few weeks later.

== Compositions ==
- Frühlingslied, for violin and piano (1906)
- Suite for orchestra (1908)
- String quartet
- Symphony Petőfi (1909)
- Symphonic poem for orchestra Falu végén kurta kocsma (1909)
- Opera Der schwarze Kavalier (1910–11) on words by Heinrich Lilienfein
- Opera Golem (1912)
- Music to Wilhelm Schmidtbonn's play Der verlorene Sohn (Berlin, 1914)
