= Ildico =

Attila the Hun wife

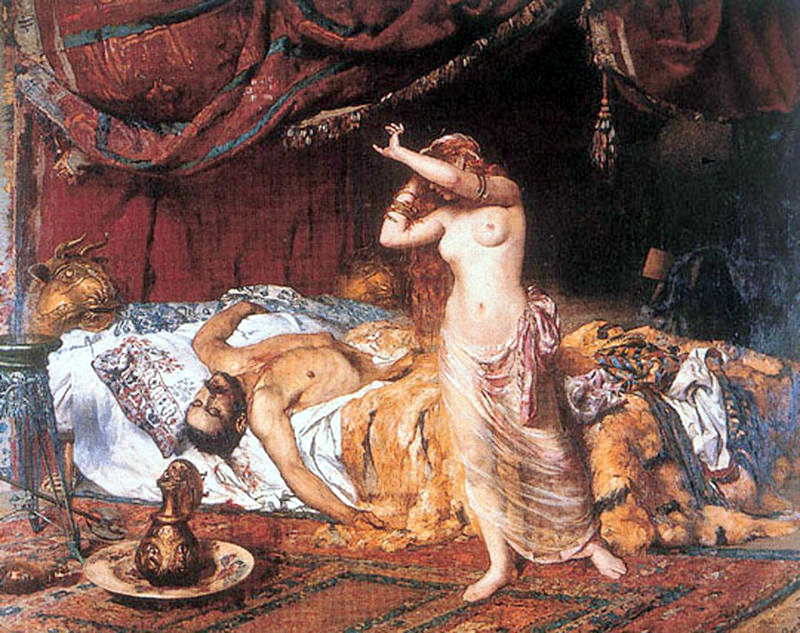
Attila's death, painting by Paczka Ferenc

Ildico (fl. AD 453) was the last wife of the Hunnic ruler Attila. Her name is probably Germanic, a diminutive form of the noun *hildiz ("battle"), a common element in Germanic female names (e.g. Svanhildr, Brynhildr and Gunnhildr), and Hildr ("battle") was the name of a Valkyrie. Her name is thus reconstructed as *Hildiko ("little Hildr"), and it is probably preserved in *Grímhild or *Krēmhild, the name of Ildico's later legendary version.

According to Priscus, Attila died after the feast celebrating their marriage in 453 AD, in which he suffered a severe nosebleed and choked to death in a stupor:

"Shortly before he died, as the historian Priscus relates, he took in marriage a very beautiful girl named Ildico, after countless other wives, as was the custom of his race. He had given himself up to excessive joy at his wedding, and as he lay on his back, heavy with wine and sleep, a rush of superfluous blood, which would ordinarily have flowed from his nose, streamed in deadly course down his throat and killed him, since it was hindered in the usual passages. Thus did drunkenness put a disgraceful end to a king renowned in war. On the following day, when a great part of the morning was spent, the royal attendants suspected some ill and, after a great uproar, broke in the doors. There they found the death of Attila accomplished by an effusion of blood, without any wound, and the girl with downcast face weeping beneath her veil."

In Germanic heroic legends, she corresponds to Guðrún/Kriemhild, and in the Norse versions she deliberately killed Attila, in revenge for the death of her kinsmen.
