= List of dwarfs in Norse mythology =

The Prose and Poetic Eddas, which form the foundation of what we know today concerning Norse mythology, contain many names of dwarfs. While many of them are featured in extant myths of their own, many others have come down to us today only as names in various lists provided for the benefit of skalds or poets of the medieval period and are included here for completeness.

== List of dwarfs ==
=== A ===
Name	Name meaning	Alternative names	Attested relatives	Attestations
Ái	Great-grandfather	Óinn		Skáldskaparmál, Völuspá
Álfr	"Elf"			Skáldskaparmál, Völuspá
Alfrigg	"Elfking"			Sörla þáttr
Alfrikr	"Elfking"			Þiðreks saga
Alius	The other			Ásmundar saga kappabana
Alþjófr	"All-thief"			Skáldskaparmál, Völuspá
Alvíss	"All-Wise"			Alvíssmál
Án	without	Óri		Völuspá
Ánarr	Starer	Annarr, Ónarr		Völuspá
Andvari	"Careful one", "Cautious spirit", "Gentle breeze"			Nafnaþulur, Reginsmál, Skáldskaparmál, Völsunga saga, Völuspá
Atvarðr				Fjölsvinnsmál
Aurvangr	"Mud-field", "Gravelly plain"	Aurvargr		Skáldskaparmál, Völuspá
Austri	"Eastern"			Gylfaginning, Skáldskaparmál, Völuspá

=== B ===
Name	Name meaning	Alternative names	Attested relatives	Attestations
Báfurr	"Bean"	Bofurr		Völuspá
Bári	"The Bearing", "Ready", "Eager"	Barri		Fjölsvinnsmál
Berling	Little bar, Handspike			Sörla þáttr
Bifurr	"Quaking one", "Beaver"			Skáldskaparmál, Völuspá
Bildr	"Plowman", "Edged weapon"			Völuspá
Billingr	Twin brother			Völuspá
Bláinn	"Dark-hued", "Blackish"			Skáldskaparmál
Blindviðr	Blind board			Skáldskaparmál
Blôvurr	"The Shining"			Skáldskaparmál
Bömburr	"Drummer", "The swollen one"			Skáldskaparmál, Völuspá
Brísingr	"Flame"			
Brokkr	"the one who works with metal fragments; blacksmith"		Brothers: Eitri, Sindri	Skáldskaparmál
Brúni	Black, Dark brown			Völuspá
Búinn	Prepared for burial			Skáldskaparmál
Buri	"Progenitor", "Son"	Burinn		Völuspá

=== D ===
Name	Name meaning	Alternative names	Attested relatives	Attestations
Dagfinnr	Day-finder, Day-magician			Skáldskaparmál
Dáinn	"The Dead One", "Deadlike"			Grímnismál, Hyndluljóð, Völuspá
Dáni	"Deadlike"			Fjölsvinnsmál
Darri	"Spearman"	Dorri		Fjölsvinnsmál
Dellingr	The gleaming one			Fjölsvinnsmál, Skáldskaparmál
Dolgr	"Warrior", "Enemy"			Skáldskaparmál
Dólgþrasir	"Persisting warrior", "Battle-eager"	Dolgþvari		Völuspá
Dóri	"The Fortifying", "Borer", "Auger-man"			Fjölsvinnsmál, Skáldskaparmál, Völuspá
Draupnir	"Dropper", "Dripper"	Dramir, Draufnir		Skáldskaparmál, Völuspá
Dúfr	"The Crooked", "The Deep", "Nodder"			Skáldskaparmál, Völuspá
Duneyrr	"Thundering ear" or "Dark ear"			Grímnismál, Gylfaginning
Duraþrór	"Thriving Slumber"			Grímnismál, Gylfaginning
Durinn	"Slumber", "Door" or "Door-warden"	Dulinn		Gylfaginning, Hervarar saga, Skáldskaparmál, Völuspá
Dúrnir	"Door", "Door-warden", "Sleeper"			Laufás-Edda, Skáldskaparmál, Ynglingatal
Dvalinn	"the dormant one", "the one slumbering", "Torpid"			Alvíssmál, Fáfnismál, Grímnismál, Gylfaginning, Hávamál, Hervarar saga, Skáldskaparmál, Sörla þáttr, Völuspá

=== E ===
Name	Name meaning	Alternative names	Attested relatives	Attestations
Eggmóinn	Slain by the sword			Skáldskaparmál
Eikinskjaldi	"Oaken shield"			Skáldskaparmál, Völuspá
Eilífr	He who lives alone			
Eitri	The very cold one		Brother: Brokkr	Skáldskaparmál

=== F ===
Name	Name meaning	Alternative names	Attested relatives	Attestations
Fafnir	fathomer		Father: Hreiðmarr; Brothers: Ótr, Regin	Gylfaginning, Völsunga saga
Fáinn	Shining			Skáldskaparmál
Fár	"The caretaker" or "the defender", "Shining"			Skáldskaparmál
Farli	The faring one			Skáldskaparmál
Fíli	"The one who files", "File"			Skáldskaparmál, Völuspá
Finnr	Lapp, Magician	Fiðr		Völuspá
Fjalar	"Paneller"	Falr	Brother: Galar	Skáldskaparmál, Völuspá
Fjǫlsviðr	"Very Powerful", "Very wise"			Skáldskaparmál
Fǫrvi				Skáldskaparmál
Frægr	Famous			Völuspá
Frár	Swift	Frór		Völuspá
Fríðr	Fair, Beautiful, Handsome			Skáldskaparmál
Frosti	"Frosty", "Cold"			Skáldskaparmál, Völuspá
Fullangr	Long enough			Skáldskaparmál
Fundinn	"Found"			Völuspá

=== G ===
Name	Name meaning	Alternative names	Attested relatives	Attestations
Gandálfr	"Wand-elf" "Magic elf", "Wolf elf"			Skáldskaparmál, Völuspá
Galar	Yeller, Singer		Brother: Fjalar	Skáldskaparmál
Ginnarr	"Seducer", "Deceiver"			Skáldskaparmál, Völuspá
Glói	"The glowing one"	Glóinn		Skáldskaparmál, Völuspá
Gloni	"Staring", "The glowing one"			
Gollmævill	Rich sea-king			Skáldskaparmál
Grer	Roaring			Sörla þáttr
Grímr	"The masked one", "Mask"			Skáldskaparmál
Gud	"God"			
Gustr	"A puff of wind"			

=== H ===
Name	Name meaning	Alternative names	Attested relatives	Attestations
Hanarr	"The skillfull" or "Chanter"	Hárr		Skáldskaparmál, Völuspá
Hár	"The high"	Haurr		Skáldskaparmál, Völuspá
Haugspori	Howe-treader	Hugstari		Völuspá
Hepti	"Impeding"			Völuspá
Heptifili	"File-holder", "Filer", "File with handle"			Skáldskaparmál, Völuspá
Heri	"Host", "Hare"			Skáldskaparmál
Herrauðr	Army-peace			
Herriðr	Army-beautiful			
Hildingr	Warrior, Prince, King			Skáldskaparmál
Hleðjolfr	"Shield Wolf", "Sword"			Völuspá
Hlévangr	"Grave-mound", "Sheltered plain"	Hlévargr		Völuspá
Hljóðolfr	"Silent Wolf", "Howl-wolf"	Hljóðalfr		Skáldskaparmál
Hornbori	"He who bore horn's hair", "Hornborer"			Skáldskaparmál, Völuspá
Horr	"The Dear", "Linen" "Bowstring"			
Hreiðmarr	nest-horse		Sons: Fafnir, Ótr, Regin	Gylfaginning, Völsunga saga
Hugstari	"Battle thinker" or "strategist", "The bold one"	Hoggstari		Skáldskaparmál

=== I ===
Name	Name meaning	Alternative names	Attested relatives	Attestations
Iri	"the rumor spreading", "Irish"			
Ívaldi	"Wielder of the yew bow", "Warrior"			

=== J ===
Name	Name meaning	Alternative names	Attested relatives	Attestations
Jaki	Ice-floe, Ice-berg			Skáldskaparmál
Jari	"The Disputing", "Warrior"			Völuspá

=== K ===
Name	Name meaning	Alternative names	Attested relatives	Attestations
Kili	"Wedge"			Skáldskaparmál, Völuspá

=== L ===
Name	Name meaning	Alternative names	Attested relatives	Attestations
Líðskjalfr	"Shaking in the limbs"			Fjölsvinnsmál
Litr	"Countenance" or "Image" or "Complexion", "Colour"			Skáldskaparmál, Völuspá
Ljómi	Glow, Gleam, Shine			Skáldskaparmál
Lofarr	Stooper			Skáldskaparmál, Völuspá
Lóinn	Lazy			Skáldskaparmál
Lóni	Lazy person			Völuspá

=== M ===
Name	Name meaning	Alternative names	Attested relatives	Attestations
Miðvið	The middle board or slat			Skáldskaparmál
Mjöðvitnir	"Knowing in mead" or "Mead wolf", "Toper"	Móðvitnir		Skáldskaparmál, Völuspá
Mjǫklituð	Much coloured, Nearly red			Skáldskaparmál
Moinn	"Moor beast"			Völuspá
Mondull	Axle, Shaft, Handle			
Mótsognir	He who roars in rage			Skáldskaparmál, Völuspá
Munin	The reminding one			Skáldskaparmál

=== N ===
Name	Name meaning	Alternative names	Attested relatives	Attestations
Nabbi	Small boil			Hyndluljóð
Næfr	Clever, skilled			Skáldskaparmál
Náinn	"Corpse"			Skáldskaparmál, Völuspá
Nali	"Corpse" or "Death" or "Needle", "Axle of a hand-mill"	Váli		Völuspá
Nár	"Corpse"			Skáldskaparmál, Völuspá
Nefi	Relative, nephew			Skáldskaparmál
Níðhǫggr	"Malice striker" or "Tenebrous Gnawer", "The hateful striking one"			Skáldskaparmál
Niði	"Underworld being", "The one associated with the dark moon"			Skáldskaparmál, Völuspá
Nípingr	"The Dark" or "The Handsome" or "The Curving", "Pinch"	Nífengr		Skáldskaparmál, Völuspá
Norðri	"Northern", "The one in the North"			Gylfaginning, Skáldskaparmál, Völuspá
Nóri	Little shaver			Völuspá
Nýi	"New moon"			Skáldskaparmál, Völuspá
Nýr	"The new", "New"			Skáldskaparmál, Völuspá
Nýráðr	"New advice", "Ingenious"			Skáldskaparmál, Völuspá

=== O ===
Name	Name meaning	Alternative names	Attested relatives	Attestations
Óinn	Shy		Son: Andvari	Reginsmál', Skáldskaparmál
Olius				Ásmundar saga kappabana
Ǫlni	The one on the fore-arm			Skáldskaparmál
Ónn	Hard work, An (undefined) part of a sword			Skáldskaparmál
Óri	"The insane", "The violent one"			Fjölsvinnsmál, Skáldskaparmál, Völuspá
Ótr	"Otter"		Father: Hreiðmarr; Brothers: Fafnir, Regin	Gylfaginning, Völsunga saga

=== P ===
Name	Name meaning	Alternative names	Attested relatives	Attestations
Patti	Little shaver, little boy			

=== R ===
Name	Name meaning	Alternative names	Attested relatives	Attestations
Ráðspakr	Wise in counsel			Skáldskaparmál
Ráðsviðr	"Powerful advice", "Wise in counsel"			Skáldskaparmál, Völuspá
Regin	"Great" or "Vast", "The potent one", "The wielder"		Father: Hreiðmarr; Brothers: Fafnir, Ótr	Gylfaginning, Völsunga saga
Rekkr	Warrior, hero, man			Skáldskaparmál

=== S ===
Name	Name meaning	Alternative names	Attested relatives	Attestations
Siarr	"The Panning", "He who makes the sparks fly", "Smith"			
Sindri	"Spark", "Slanting board", "Slat"	None attested	Brother: Brokkr	Gylfaginning, Skáldskaparmál, Þorsteins saga Víkingssonar, Völuspá
Skávær	"The good-natured"			Skáldskaparmál
Skafiðr	"The scraper"			Skáldskaparmál, Völuspá
Skirfir	"Skillful artisan", "joiner who makes herring-bone panelling"			Skáldskaparmál, Völuspá
Suðri	"Southern", "the one in the South"			Gylfaginning, Skáldskaparmál, Völuspá
Sons of Ivaldi			Father: Ívaldi	
Svíurr	"The Disappearing"	Sviðr		Völuspá

=== T ===
Name	Name meaning	Alternative names	Attested relatives	Attestations
Þekkr	"The welcome one" or "The thinker" or "The amiable", "Beloved"			Skáldskaparmál, Völuspá
Tigvi				Skáldskaparmál
þjóðrœrir	"The one buried in the famous stone-heap", "The famous one buried in the stone-heap"			Hávamál
Þjórr	Bull			
Tóki	Blockhead			
Þolinn	The mumbling one, Silly person			Skáldskaparmál
Þorin	"The Daring", "Bold"			Skáldskaparmál, Völuspá
Þráinn	"The Threatening", "The Audacious", "Stubborn"	Þróinn		Völuspá
Þrasir	"snorter", "The one in rage"			Skáldskaparmál
Þrór	"Inciter of strife", "The thriving", "Boar"	þrár		Skáldskaparmál, Völuspá
Túta	Little nub			

=== U ===
Name	Name meaning	Alternative names	Attested relatives	Attestations
Uni	"The content", "The calm one"			Fjölsvinnsmál
Úri	"The smith", "The slag-man"			Fjölsvinnsmál

=== V ===
Name	Name meaning	Alternative names	Attested relatives	Attestations
Varr	"The cautious", "Wary", "Shy"			Fjölsvinnsmál, Skáldskaparmál
Vegdrasill	"Courageous in battle", "Road-steed", "Glory-steed"			Fjölsvinnsmál
Veggr	"The toothy", "Wedge"			Völuspá
Veigr	"The defiant", "Strength"			
Vestri	"Western", "The one in the West"			Gylfaginning, Völuspá
Viðr	Board, Slat, Rung			Skáldskaparmál
Vífir	Fututor, good man			Skáldskaparmál
Viggr	Axe-bit			
Vigr	Spear			
Vili	"Will"			Völuspá
Vindálfr	"Wind-elf"			Skáldskaparmál, Völuspá
Virwir	"The virulent", "Dyer"	Virfir		Skáldskaparmál, Völuspá
Vitr	"Wise"			Skáldskaparmál, Völuspá

=== Y ===
Name	Name meaning	Alternative names	Attested relatives	Attestations
Yngvi	"Prince" or "Warrior", "Frey"	Ingi		Völuspá

== General references ==
- Faulkes, Anthony (transl. and ed.) (1987). Edda (Snorri Sturluson). Everyman. ISBN 0-460-87616-3
- Larrington, Carolyne (transl. and ed.) (1996). The Poetic Edda. Oxford World's Classics. ISBN 0-19-283946-2
- Gurevich, Elena: (Introduction to) Anonymous, Dverga heiti; in Kari Ellen Gade and Edith Marold (eds.): Poetry from Treatises on Poetics - Skaldic Poetry of the Scandinavian Middle Ages 3; Turnhout: Brepols, 2017 (p. 692).
- Gould, Chester Nathan: Dwarf-Names - A Study in Old Icelandic Religion; in PMLA, Vol. 44, No. 4 (Dec., 1929) (pp. 939–967). doi:10.2307/457704
