= Hylestad stave church =

Stave church located in Hylestad

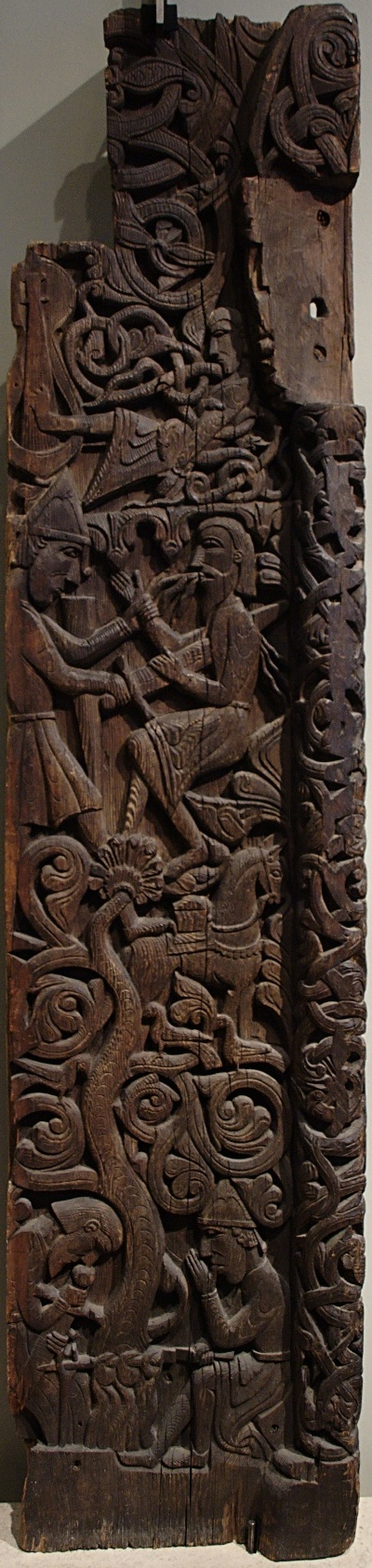
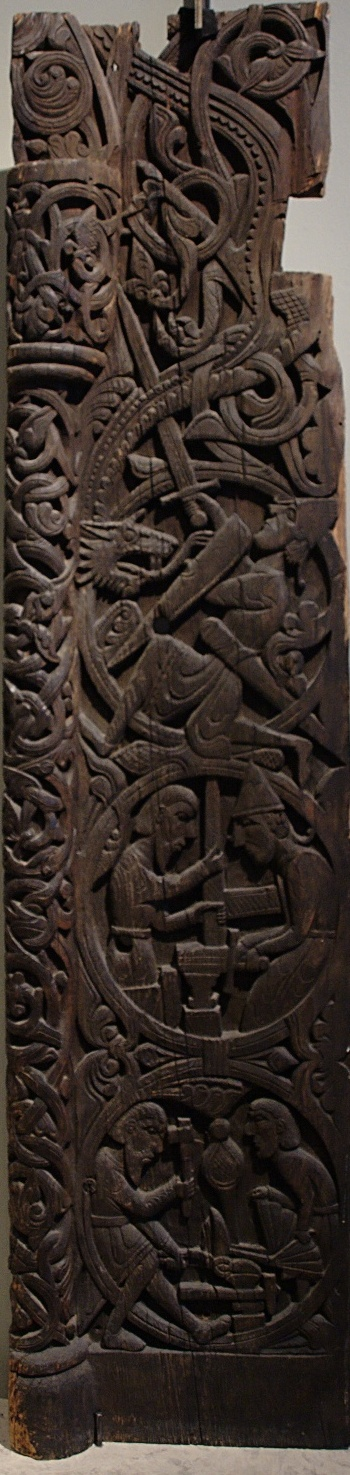
Carving from Hylestad Stave Church doorway (left side). Carving from Hylestad Stave Church doorway (right side).

The Hylestad stave church was a stave church located in Hylestad Municipality (now part of Valle Municipality) in the Setesdal valley of southern Norway. The church was estimated to have been built in the late 12th to the early 13th century and was demolished in the 17th century. Some of the intricate wood carvings from the church doorway were saved and incorporated into other buildings. They are now on display at the Museum of Cultural History in Oslo.

The carvings show several scenes from the legend of Sigurð Fáfnir's bane. A section of one of these carvings in which Sigurð kills Regin was the basis for a Norwegian postal stamp.

== Engravings ==
There are seven scenes from the Sigurð legend carved on the two door panels, with three scenes on the first panel and four scenes on the second panel. The description below notes the scenes and the corresponding section from the legend, with the order of the fifth and sixth scenes reversed to follow the normal sequence of the legend.

Based on the clothes and equipment, the panels have been dated to the second half of the 12th century. The figures and medallions on Hylestad I and the vine on Hylestad II show close parallels to English and French manuscript illuminations from around 1170.

=== Sigurð and Regin forge the sword Gram ===
The first scene shows Sigurð (who wears a helmet) and Regin (who has a beard) at the forge and the second scene shows Sigurð holding the mended sword.

Sigurð, described as one of the best swordsmen, was urged by Regin to seek Fáfnir the worm or dragon's treasure. Regin then forged a sword with Sigurð at his side, providing assistance by keeping the fire going and providing water to cool the blade when needed. When the sword was completed they named it Gram. Sigurð tested the sword by striking it upon Regin's shield, which had a picture of Fáfnir engraved on it. The blade broke, which prompted Regin to forge another sword out of the broken pieces of the first Gram. When it was completed Sigurð tested the blade once again on the shield with Fáfnir's image, and this time it cut through the shield and also cut off the horn of the anvil.

=== Sigurð slays Fáfnir the dragon ===
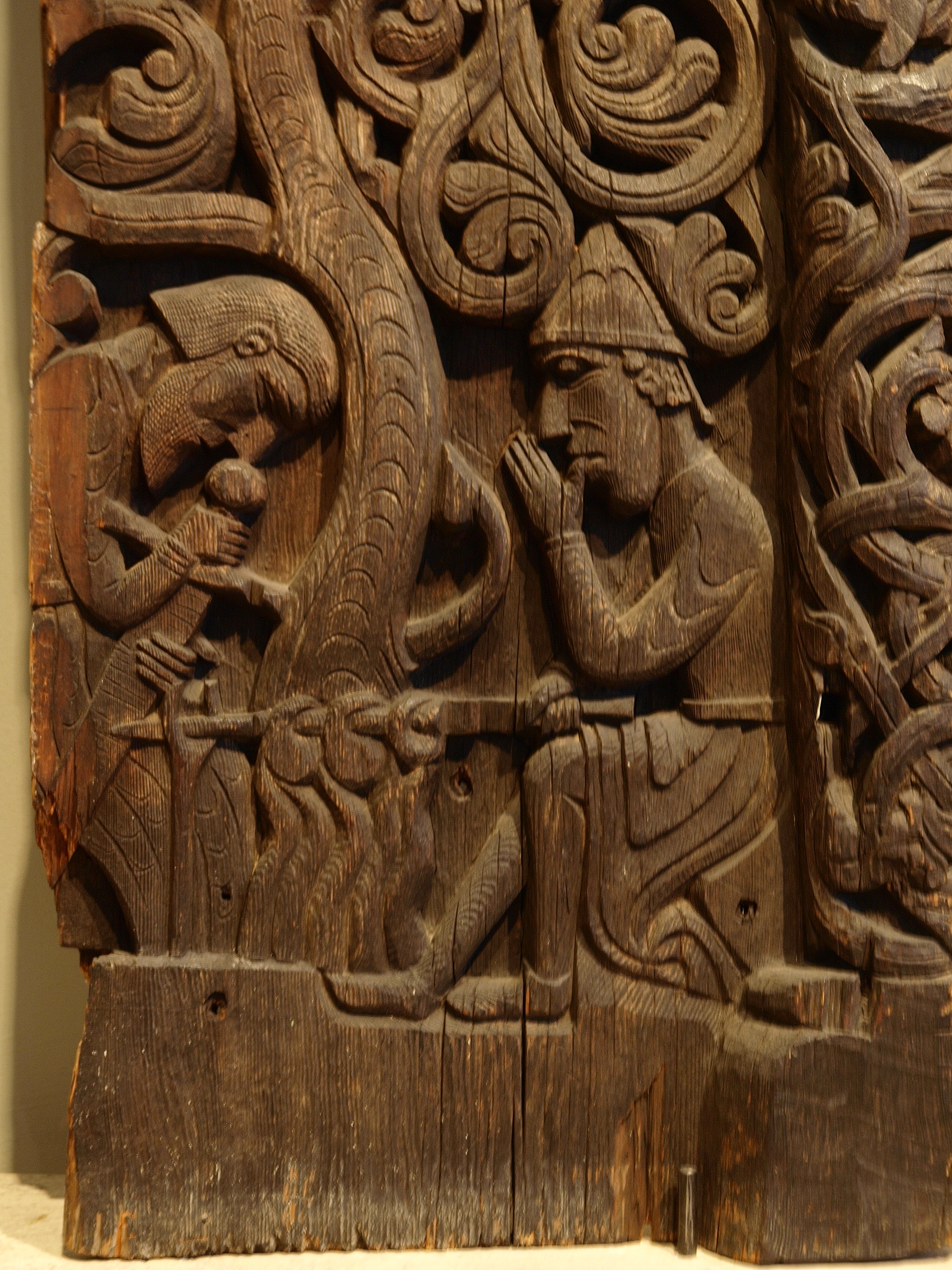
Sigurð sucking the dragon blood off his thumb.

The third scene shows Sigurð slaying the dragon with a sword.

After forging the sword, Sigurð and Regin travel to Gnita-Heath in order to find Fáfnir the dragon and take his treasure. There they dig a pit in the path used by Fáfnir, and then he crawled into it. When Fáfnir came to the water pit Sigurð emerged and "thrust his sword" into Fáfnir, killing him.

=== Sigurð roasts the dragon's heart ===
The fourth scene, which is on the second door panel, shows Sigurð roasting the heart of the dragon and sucking his thumb while Regin appears to sleep.

After slaying Fáfnir, Regin asks Sigurð to take the dragon's heart and roast it for him, before drinking his brother's blood and going to sleep. Sigurð then touched the heart to see if it was cooked, but it burnt his hand, and he sucked his finger to cool it down. When he drank the dragon's blood by accident, he was able to understand the speech of birds. From the birds, which are depicted in the fifth scene, he heard of Regin's plot to kill Sigurð, in to avenge his brother.

=== Sigurð kills Regin ===
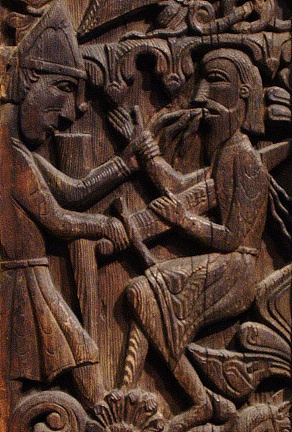
The slaying of Regin.

In the sixth scene, Sigurð slays Regin with his sword.

Sigurð, both warned by the birds of Regin's plot to betray him and encouraged by their assertions that great wealth, knowledge, and power would be his if he killed Regin preemptively and took possession of Fáfnir's treasure, kills Regin. Sigurð, convinced by their counsel, states "It will not be my ill fate that Regin shall be my death. Rather, both brothers should go the same way." Sigurð decapitates Regin using the sword Gram.

=== Grani carries the treasure ===
In the fifth scene, Sigurð's horse Grani stands carrying a chest containing Fáfnir's expansive treasure and two birds are depicted below Grani perched in the branches of a tree. The birds likely belong to the group whose speech Sigurð understood. This scene combines elements of the legend that took place before and after the slaying of Regin.

After killing Regin, Sigurð mounts Grani, and rides to Fáfnir's lair, where he finds his hoard from which he takes treasures including the helm of terror and the sword Hrotti specifically. Sigurð loads large chests with the treasure onto Grani, despite expecting that it would be too large a load even for a pair of horses. Grani carries the treasure without difficulty, even refusing to move until Sigurð rides on his back, running "as if unencumbered."

=== Gunnar in the serpent pit ===
The last panel shows Sigurð's brother-in-law, Gunnar, in a snake pit playing the harp with his feet in an attempt to pacify the snakes.

In his dying breaths, Fáfnir warns Sigurð that his gold is cursed and "will be the death of all that possess it." Sigurð, is unfazed by this and mentions the mortality of all men. After Sigurð's death at the hands of his three brothers-in-law, Gunnar, Hogni, and Guttorm, Fáfnir's treasure is hidden by Gunnar, sunk to the bottom of the Rhine. Gudrun remarries, to Atli (Atilla the Hun), who is fascinated by the treasure and seeks to own it. Gunnar refuses to tell Atli its location, insisting, "Rather shall the Rhine rule over the gold than the Huns wear it on their arms." Atli orders Gunnar to be placed into a serpent pit, with his hands bound behind his back. Gudrun sends her brother a harp, and Gunnar is able to play "so exceedingly well" with his toes that he lulls the snakes to sleep, "except for one large and hideous adder" who kills Gunnar in a single strike.

== Origin of the panels ==
According to Peter Gustav Blom, who was a mayor of Valle Municipality, there was a legend about that the two doorway panels with the carving are originally coming from a cave called Tolvkjørkhellaren (in mountains of Sirdal Municipality), where it was before ca. 1600 a chapel or even a cave church of Saint Tollef Salemann from Tessungdal, and the carvings were made by some local girls (probably three sisters from another legend about the cave). But the fact of the existence of the chapel itself is problematic. For example, Andreas Faye mentions another origin of the cave′s name, which has nothing to do with a church or the saint. Very little is known about the saint as well. His veneration tradition was banned in 1692 and ceased. The cave in later times was used as a resting place by local shepherds, but now is under water after a dam was built, what makes further archaeological research hard. Before the dam, there were researches in the cave, but they gave no notable results.

Similar carvings with Sigurð are known from some other stave churches, like in Vegusdal, Mæl, Nesland and the old Lardal (Svarstad) church. The stave churches in Uvdal and Austad do also have carvings with motives from Völsunga saga. Sigurð himself as a legendary hero did not lost his popularity among Norwegians even after the Middle Ages, and several ballads with him were recorded from traditional singers in Setesdal and Telemark during 18th and 19th centirues (see more in the entry about him).

== See also ==
- Sigurd stones
- Volsung cycle
