= Patricide =

Act of killing one's father

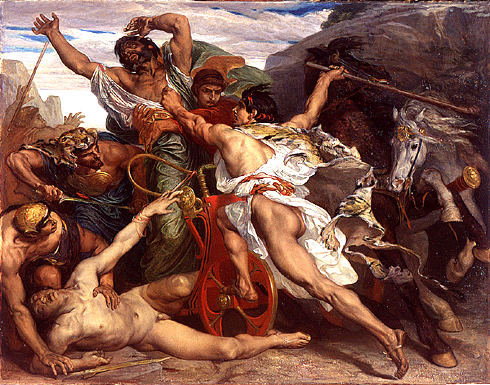
Le Meurtre de Laïus par Oedipe by Joseph Blanc depicts the mythological patricide of Laius by his son Oedipus.

Patricide (or paternal homicide) is the act of killing one's own father. The word patricide derives from the Latin word pater (father) and the suffix -cida (cutter or killer). Patricide is a sub-form of parricide, which is defined as an act of killing a close relative. In many cultures and religions, patricide was considered one of the worst sins. For example, according to Marcus Tullius Cicero, in the Roman Republic it was the only crime that led a civilian to death penalty.

== Patricides in myths and religions ==
Patricide is a common motif that is prevalent throughout many religions and cultures, and particularly in the mythology and religion of Greek culture. Some key examples of patricide from various cultures are included as follows:

- Apsu, in the Babylonian creation epic the Enûma Elish, was killed by his son Ea in the struggle for supremacy among the gods.
- In the mythology of the neighboring Mesopotamian Hurrian people the storm god Teshub kills his father Kumarbi, sometimes jointly with his grandfather Anu in reciprocity for an attempted patricide by Kumarbi.
- In the Greek creation epic, first recorded in Hesiod's Theogony, Cronus was jealous of his father Uranus' power as ruler of the universe. Cronus thus killed or castrated his father. Cronus, in turn, was overthrown by his own son, Zeus.
- Oedipus was fated to kill his father, a king, and marry his mother. His parents attempted to prevent this by leaving him on the side of a mountain as an infant. He was found and raised by a shepherd. Once grown, Oedipus meets his father while his father is traveling, but not knowing who he is, ends up killing him. He then unknowingly marries his mother to become king, ultimately fulfilling the prophecy.
- Pelias was killed by his daughters, who were deceived by Medea into thinking he could be resurrected.
- In the Hindu epic Mahabharata, Babruvahana killed his father Arjun, but Arjun was brought back to life by his wife, the snake goddess Uloopi.
- In Chinese belief, people who commit patricide (or matricide) will be killed by a lightning strike as a punishment from filial and warrior deity Erlang Shen.
- In Norse mythology, Fafnir murdered his father Hreidmar to gain the cursed golden ring of Andvari that he had obtained. Some versions say that his brother Regin helped him.
- In the legend of West Java, Indonesia, Tangkuban Perahu, Sangkuriang, is said to have killed his father, who was a dog, because he did not get any prey.

== Known or suspected historical patricides ==
- Tukulti-Ninurta I (r. 1243–1207 BC), Assyrian king, was killed by his own son after sacking Babylon.
- Sennacherib (r. 704–681 BC), Assyrian king, was killed by two of his sons for his desecration of Babylon.
- Bimbisara (r. 543–491 BC), king of Magadha, was executed by his son Ajatashatru.
- King Kassapa I (AD 473–495) creator of the Sigiriya citadel of ancient Sri Lanka killed his father king Dhatusena for the throne.
- Ajatashatru (r. 492–c. 460 BC), king of Magadha, was killed by his son Udayabhadra.
- King Chlodoric the Parricide (d. 509) killed his father Sigobert the Lame, a Frankish king, for the throne. He himself was later killed by Clovis.
- Emperor Zhu Yougui (888?–913) of China killed his father Zhu Wen (852–912).
- Emperor Yang of Sui (569–618) in Chinese history allegedly killed his father, Emperor Wen of Sui (541–604).
- Ningling Ge (1032–1048), the crown prince of Western Xia, killed his father Emperor Jingzong of Western Xia, because his wife was seduced by Jingzong.
- Ulugh Beg (1394–1449) of the Timurid Empire was killed by his son Abdal-Latif Mirza, who also killed his own brother 'Abd al-'Aziz a few days later. He as such became the ruler of the empire, only to be killed by his cousin Abdallah Mirza six months later.
- Rana Kumbha (r. 1438–1468), the King of Mewar Kingdom, in India was killed by his son Udai, who then succeeded him becoming Rana Udai Singh I of Mewar. Udai was killed five years later by his younger brother Raimal who wanted to avenge his father's death.
- Jagaddeva (r. 1150), the Chahamana king of India, killed his father Arnoraja.
- Beatrice Cenci (1577–1599), Italian noblewoman who killed her father after he imprisoned and raped her. She was condemned and beheaded for the crime along with her brother and her stepmother in 1599.
- Amangkurat I, the fourth Sultan of Mataram (r. 1645–1677), was allegedly poisoned by his son Raden Mas Rahmat.
- Iyasus I of Ethiopia (1682–1706), one of the great warrior emperors of Ethiopia, was deposed by his son Tekle Haymanot in 1706 and subsequently assassinated.
- Ajit Singh of Marwar (1679–1724) was murdered by his sons Bakht Singh and Abhai Singh in 1724 after the two plotted to take his place as Maharaja of Marwar.
- Karađorđe Petrović (1768–1817), the leader of the Serbian uprising against the Ottoman Empire, and eventual leader of independent Serbia, killed his father Petar around 1786 while the family was fleeing Serbia to the safety of the Austro-Hungarian Empire, after Petar threatened to return to Serbia and betray the family to the Turks.
- Richard Dadd (1817–1886), the English artist, murdered his father in 1843 following the onset of psychiatric illness.
- Milas K. Young (1812–1875), a farmer and politician in Grant County, Wisconsin, was murdered by his eldest son in a dispute over the family estate. His son and wife both subsequently committed suicide.
- Lizzie Borden (1860–1927) allegedly killed her father and her stepmother with a hatchet in Fall River, Massachusetts, in 1892. She was acquitted, but her innocence is still disputed.
- Thomas Young (born 1931) killed his father, 47-year-old Albert Young, and four other people on Christmas day of 1958. He was executed in 1959.
- Chiyo Aizawa murdered her father, who had been raping her for fifteen years, on October 5, 1968, in Japan. The incident changed the Criminal Code of Japan regarding patricide.
- The Menéndez brothers were convicted during a highly publicized second trial in July 1996 for the shotgun killings of their parents in 1989.
- Marie Robards (born 1977) admitted to poisoning her father in 1993.
- Kip Kinkel (born 1982), an Oregon boy who was convicted of killing his parents at home on May 20, 1998. The next day, he killed two fellow students at school.
- Dipendra of Nepal (1971–2001) reportedly massacred much of his family at a royal dinner on June 1, 2001, including his father King Birendra, mother, brother, and sister.
- Derek King (born 1988) and Alex King (1989–2024) murdered their father Terry King in Florida in 2001.
- Sarah Marie Johnson (born 1987), an Idaho girl who was convicted of killing both parents on the morning of September 2, 2003. She was sentenced to life-imprisonment in 2005.
- Christopher Porco (born 1983), was convicted on August 10, 2006, of the murder of his father and attempted murder of his mother with an axe.
- Alvaro Castillo, shot and killed his father Rafael Castillo before committing a school shooting at Orange High School in North Carolina, injuring two people before he was tackled by school personnel on August 30, 2006.
- Former Australian rules football player and then-Adelaide Crows senior coach Phil Walsh was killed by his adult son on 3 July 2015.
- Jesse Osborne shot and killed his father, Jeffrey Osborne, before driving to Townville Elementary School and fatally shooting 1 student and injuring 3 others.
- David Kozák killed his father with a Škorpion vz. 61 before committing a mass shooting at the Faculty of Arts building of Charles University in Prague, Czech Republic on December 21, 2023. He was also linked to two other murders less than a week prior.

== Contemporary statistics ==
In the United States between 1980 and 2010 fathers were more likely than mothers to be killed by their children. Teenage sons (16 to 19 years-old) were most often the perpetrators in parental killings.

Breakdown of known homicides involving children killing a father between 1980 and 2008. Sons committed patricide far more frequently than daughters.

Rates of individual homicide involving family members in the United States between 1980 and 2010.

== See also ==
- Avunculicide, the killing of one's uncle
- Filicide, the killing of one's child
- Fratricide, the killing of one's brother
- Mariticide, the killing of one's husband
- Matricide, the killing of one's mother
- Parricide, the killing of one's parents or another close relative
- Sororicide, the killing of one's sister
- Uxoricide, the killing of one's wife
