= Völsunga saga =

13th century Icelandic saga

Drawing of the Ramsund carving from c. 1030, illustrating the Völsunga saga on a rock in Sweden. At (1), Sigurd sits in front of the fire preparing the dragon's heart.

The Völsunga saga (Old Norse: Vǫlsunga saga, often referred to in English as the Volsunga Saga or Saga of the Völsungs) is a legendary saga, a late 13th-century prose rendition in Old Norse of the origin and decline of the Völsung clan (including the story of Sigurd and Brunhild and the destruction of the Burgundians). It is one of the most famous legendary sagas and an example of a "heroic saga" that deals with Germanic heroic legend.

The saga covers topics including the quarrel between Sigi and Skaði, a huge family tree of great kings and powerful conquerors, the quest led by Sigmund and Sinfjǫtli to save princess Signý from the evil king Siggeir, and, most famously, Sigurd killing the serpent/dragon Fáfnir and obtaining the cursed ring Andvaranaut that Fáfnir guarded.

== Context and overview ==
The saga is largely based on the epic poetry of the historic Elder Edda. The earliest known pictorial representation of this tradition is the Ramsund carving in Sweden, which was created c. 1000 CE.

The origins of the material are considerably older, however, and it in part echoes real events in Central Europe during the Migration Period, chiefly the destruction of the Kingdom of the Burgundians by the Huns in the fifth century. Some of the poems contained in the Elder Edda relate episodes from the Vǫlsung legend. On the other hand, the only surviving medieval manuscript of the saga, Ny kgl. Saml. 1824 b 4to, which is held by the Royal Library of Denmark, dates to about 1400. In this manuscript, the saga leads straight in to Ragnars saga loðbrókar.

=== Characters ===
Characters in the Vǫlsunga saga

Óðinn
Sigi
Rerir
Vǫlsungr	Hljóð	Eylimi
Siggeirr	Signý	Sigmundr	Hjǫrdís	Alfr
Borghildr
Buðli	Gjúki	Grímhildr	Sinfjǫtli	Helgi
Atli	Brynhildr	Gunnarr	Hǫgni	Guttormr	Guðrún	Sigurðr	Brynhildr
Glaumvǫr	Kostbera	Atli
Jónakr
Hamðir	Sǫrli	Erpr	Svanhildr	Sigmundr	Áslaug	Ragnarr	Þóra
Ívarr	Bjǫrn	Hvítserkr	Sigurðr

== Contents ==
The saga can be divided into five phases: the preliminary generations, Sigurd and his foster family, Sigurd and the Gjukingar, Gudrun and the Budlingar, and Gudrun's last marriage.

=== Vǫlsung's ancestors ===
The Vǫlsunga saga begins with Sigi, the ancestor of the Vǫlsung lineage, and Skaði. Sigi was more important since he was richer and more powerful and was said to be a son of Odin. In the saga, Skaði owns a thrall named Breði whom Sigi takes on a hunting trip all day and evening. When they compare their skills, Breði's outshine Sigi's. Enraged, Sigi murders Breði and hides his body in a snowdrift. When Sigi returns, he lies to Skaði that Breði rode away into the forest. But Skaði, suspecting something amiss, goes off with his men in search of Breði and discovers his body in the snowdrift. Skaði declares the drift "Breði's drift", and soon every large drift comes to be called "Breði's drift" in his honor. Skaði casts Sigi out, leaving him "a wolf in hallowed places".

After much adventuring, Odin leads Sigi to a land where some longships lay. He and his troops (that his unnamed father gave him) take up raiding. Sigi becomes a successful raider and warlord before seizing a kingdom called Hunaland to rule. His wife's brothers eventually become envious of Sigi's power and wealth and raise an army against him. In the following battle, Sigi is killed and his enemies take over the kingdom. Later, Sigi's son Rerir avenges his father's death, killing his uncles and taking his father's throne. However, he and his wife have no heir, so they turn to Odin and Frigg to pray for one. In response, Odin and Frigg send one of their wish maidens to take the form of a crow and place a magical apple on Rerir's lap. When Rerir shares it with the queen, she conceives and endures an extraordinarily long pregnancy. While awaiting the birth of his heir, Rerir goes on a campaign to pacify the land, but he catches sick and dies before returning. Since the queen knows that she has not long left before the pregnancy kills her, she orders her baby to be cut from her. She dies in the process, but the male child survives and is named Vǫlsung.

=== The life of king Vǫlsung ===
Vǫlsung marries Hljod, the daughter of a jötunn and the maiden who gave the queen the golden apple. Vǫlsung and Hljod have ten sons and one daughter, the two eldest and strongest being the boy and girl twins Sigmund and Signý. King Vǫlsung has a grand palace built for him, with the great hall built around a massive tree known as Barnstokkr (lit. 'child trunk') to stand proudly over Vǫlsung's guests. One day, Siggeir, the king of Gautland, comes to visit Vǫlsung and ask for Signý's hand in marriage. Vǫlsung is pleased at the idea of Signý marrying Siggeir, but Signý despises him. King Vǫlsung arranges the marriage anyway. On the wedding day, as everyone is celebrating, a hooded man with one eye comes into the hall, draws a sword, and thrusts it into Barnstokkr. The mysterious figure says that whoever can pull the sword from Barnstokkr will receive it as a gift, then abruptly leaves. Although the saga does not explicitly say who the man is, his hood and missing eye suggest he is Odin. Indeed, later in the saga it is made clear that such a man could be no one but the All-father, as the figure returns to set more formidable challenges, and the sword later demonstrates its divine powers. Many people attempt to draw the sword from the tree, but no one can make it budge until Sigmund Vǫlsungson comes and pulls the sword out with ease. King Siggeir offers to buy the sword, but Sigmund refuses. That night Siggeir and Signý sleep together, and by the next day she is pressuring King Vǫlsung to allow them to divorce. Although his daughter is in distress, he reluctantly refuses, so as to maintain their alliance with Gautland.

But when Signý travels to Gautland, she finds out that Siggeir is plotting to overthrow Vǫlsung and add Hunaland to his empire. Signý returns to Hunaland to gather Vǫlsung, Sigmund, and their most powerful men, telling them that they must raise an army and invade Gautland if they do not want Hunaland to fall. Vǫlsung agrees to the invasion, sending his army to the shore of Gautland to overthrow and kill Siggeir. After a long, grim, and intense battle, the Vǫlsungs are forced to concede defeat after the deaths of the king and one of his sons.

=== The war against Siggeir ===
Signý goes to speak with King Siggeir as his wife, begging him to tie her brothers up instead of killing them. Siggeir agrees, thinking a slower death more suitable for them, so the brothers are tied up by their feet and hands and thrown into the woods to die. Signý, hoping for this outcome, sends one of her most trusted men to find her brothers. When he finds them, they tell him that one has been killed and eaten by a she-wolf. For some reason, however, he is unable to untie them, and the she-wolf continues to come every night until only Sigmund is left alive. On the day before he would die, Signý's scout returns to the forest and gives him honey, instructing Sigmund to put some in his mouth and smear it on his face. When the she-wolf comes she begins to lick Sigmund's face, and intrigued by the sweetness, she puts her tongue in his mouth to lick the honey out. As soon as she does so, Sigmund bites down on her tongue, ripping it out as the beast struggles and thereby killing the she-wolf. The sage mentions that this wolf may have been Siggeir's mother who took the shape of a she-wolf through "witchcraft and sorcery". Sigmund stays where he is so that Signý's scouts can find him again. They do, informing Signý of what happened. She visits him and helps him dig an underground base, bringing him enough supplies to survive in secret while they plot revenge against Siggeir.

One night, while Signý is sitting in her chamber, a völva comes and asks her to exchange forms. They do, and the seeress sleeps with Siggeir that night without the king's notice. Meanwhile, Signý travels to Sigmund's base in the form of the völva, telling him that she had gotten lost in the woods. Sigmund accepts her in, and they have incestuous sexual intercourse. After changing back, Signý discovers she is pregnant. She gives birth to Sinfjǫtli.

When Sinfjǫtli is ten, Signý puts him and her other sons through a painful test to see who is worthy of serving Sigmund. Although the others cry out in pain, Sinfjǫtli does not flinch. Together, Sigmund and Sinfjǫtli plot revenge against King Siggeir. One night, they sneak into Siggeir's dwelling and try to assassinate him, but one of Siggeir's children catch them and have them seized. The two are thrown in a mound but escape with the power of Sigmund's sword that Signý returns to him. They kill Siggeir by making him walk into a bonfire. Signý walks in with him, wanting to die with her husband. Sigmund takes the throne, becoming a great and powerful ruler. He marries Borghild and by her has a son named Helgi.

As an adult, Helgi meets Sigrún, daughter of King Högne, and wishes to marry her. She tells him that her father has promised her to Hothbrodd, so Helgi and Sinfjǫtli raise an army and invade Hothbrodd's realm. Helgi kills Hothbrodd, marries Sigrún, and usurps Hothbrodd's kingship. Sinfjǫtli also meets a woman he wishes to marry, and to win her he fights and kills another man, who happens to be Borghild's brother. In revenge, Borghild kills Sinfjǫtli by poison. A grieving Sigmund rejects Borghild and drives her out of his kingdom.

As an old man, Sigmund marries Hjördís, daughter of King Eylimi. The suitor she rejected in Sigmund's favor brings an army against him, and Sigmund is mortally wounded in the battle. Hjördís finds her wounded husband, who entrusts to her the shards of his sword, prophesying that they will be reforged someday for their yet unborn son. He dies, and Hjördís is taken in by Alf, son of Hjalprek, king of Denmark. Shortly thereafter she gives birth to Sigurd, her son by Sigmund. Sigurd is fostered in Hjalprek's court by Reginn, his tutor, and grows to manhood there.

=== Sigurd and his foster family ===
Sigurd grows up to be strong, brave, and very popular. One day, he enters the forest looking for a horse and meets Odin, who gives him Grani, who is descended from Odin's own Sleipnir and better than any other horse. With Grani, Reginn believes Sigurd capable of a heroic quest and decides to tell him the story of Fáfnir the dragon.

Reginn's father Hreiðmarr had three sons: himself, Ótr, and Fáfnir. Ótr was able to shapeshift into an otter-like fisherman, Fáfnir was large and fierce, and Reginn was skilled with ironwork. One day, Odin, Loki, and Hœnir were fishing and killed Ótr in his otter shape, then skinned and ate him. King Hreiðmarr found out and demanded that they fill and cover the skin with gold. Loki took the dwarf Andvari's gold and the debt was paid. But out of Andvari's treasure, he cursed a ring called Andvaranaut ("Andvari's gift"), warning that it would bring death to anyone who owned it. Later, Fáfnir killed his father, hid the body, and took all the treasure, including the Advaranaut, to his hoard. There, he turned into an evil dragon. Reginn, meanwhile, became a smith for King Hjalprek.

Reginn convinces Sigurd to slay Fáfnir and take the treasure. In preparation, he smiths two swords one after another for Sigurd, but they break when he tests them. Sigurd's mother gives him the pieces of his father's broken sword and Reginn reforges them into a legendary sword called Gram. When Sigurd tests it, it splits the iron anvil down to its base. Before going to kill Fáfnir, he goes to the soothsayer Grípir to ask about his fate. Grípir tells him after some hesitation, and Sigurd returns to Reginn, saying he must avenge his father Sigmund before he can kill the dragon. Sigurd sails to Hunding's kingdom and kills many and burns settlements. A brutal battle ensues between him and King Lyngvi and Hunding's sons, but Sigurd kills them all with Gram. He returns to Reginn to prepare to meet Fáfnir.

Sigurd travels to Fáfnir's territory and digs a ditch to hide in and stab the dragon from. Odin comes and advises him to dig several ditches for the blood to flow into, which he does. As Fáfnir crawls over the ditch, Sigurd stabs him through the heart. As the dragon is dying, he asks Sigurd about his lineage and says that his gold and Reginn will be the cause of Sigurd's death. Sigurd returns to Reginn, who was hiding in the heather during Fáfnir's slaying. Reginn drinks Fáfnir's blood and asks Sigurd to roast Fáfnir's heart and let him eat it. When Sigurd tests whether the heart is fully cooked and licks his finger, he suddenly understands the speech of birds. He overhears the nuthatches talking to each other about Reginn's plan to kill him. They say that he should eat the heart himself, kill Reginn, take the gold, and find Brynhild. Sigurd kills Reginn, eats some of the heart, takes as much treasure as he can carry, including the Helm of Terror and the Andvaranaut, and rides off on Grani.

Sigurd rides to the land of the Franks and finds a sleeping warrior. He removes the helmet, discovers it is a woman, and cuts her chainmail open. She wakes and tells him Odin stabbed her with a sleeping thorn and mandated that she must marry, but she refuses to marry any man who knows fear. Brynhild gives him beer and recites a poem about how to use different magical runes. Following this, Brynhild gives Sigurd several pieces of sound advice on how to navigate society and survive, and they agree to marry each other.

=== Sigurd and the Gjukingar ===
Sigurd rides to the estate of Heimr, husband of Bekkhild, Brynhild's sister. Sigurd catches sight of Brynhild weaving a golden tapestry in the castle. Alsvid tells him to not think about women, but after Brynhild saying they are not fated to be together, they renew their vows.

Meanwhile, a skilled sorceress named Grimhild is married to King Gjuki, and together they have three sons: Gunnar, Hǫgni, and Guthormr. Their daughter Guðrún has a dream about a golden hawk, which Brynhild interprets as her future husband. They then talk of Sigurd's excellence and the prophecies about him before his birth. Then Guðrún has a dream about a handsome stag, which Brynhild interprets as Sigurd. Brynhild prophesies she will marry Sigurd, lose him, marry Atli the Hun, lose her brothers, then kill Atli.

Sigurd comes to Gjuki with his horse Grani and his treasure from the dragon Fáfnir. Grimhild gives him a drink that makes him forget about Brynhild, wanting him to marry Guðrún. Gunnar and the others swear brotherhood with Sigurd, and he marries Guðrún. She eats some of the dragon's heart, and bears Sigurd a son, Sigmund. Meanwhile, Grimhild encourages Gunnar to marry Brynhild. Sigurd and the three brothers ride to King Buðli for Gunnar to ask for Brynhild's hand. She is inside a hall surrounded by fire and has vowed an oath to marry whoever can ride through the flames, believing only Sigurd could be brave enough to do so. Gunnar can't take on this task, so he and Sigurd exchange shapes, and Sigurd rides through the fire and asks Brynhild to marry him as Gunnar. Brynhild reluctantly agrees because of her oath and leaves her daughter Aslaug by Sigurd to be raised with Heimr.

Later, Brynhild and Guðrún are arguing about whose husband is better, and Guðrún shows her the ring which Brynhild had given Sigurd. Brynhild recognizes the ring and realizes she has been tricked. She tells Gunnar she knows he deceived her and that she will kill him and seek revenge on Grimhild. Brynhild takes to her room and Sigurd comes to try to make amends by asking her to marry him, but she rejects his offer, wanting to die and bring doom upon everyone involved.

Gunnar consults with his brothers whether they should kill Sigurd to keep Brynhild or not. They decide to give snake's and wolf's meat to Guthormr to turn him violent and kill Sigurd. He goes into Sigurd's bed chamber and stabs him while asleep. Sigurd wakes up and before dying, throws Gram after him as he leaves, cutting Guthormr in two. Brynhild laughs when she hears Guðrún sobbing, and Guðrún tells Gunnar he made a mistake by killing Sigurd. Brynhild also tells Gunnar he has made a mistake and stabs herself. But before she dies, she foretells the rest of Gunnar's and Guðrún's future. Gunnar fulfills Brynhild's last request, that he put her on a bonfire with Sigurd, Guthormr, and Sigurd's 3-year-old son.

=== Guðrún and the Budlingar ===
Everyone mourns Sigurd's death and Guðrún runs away, ending up with King Half in Denmark. Grimhild finds Guðrún and orders her to marry King Atli against her will, which she unhappily does. One night, Atli has a dream that he is fed his children, which Guðrún interprets to mean his sons will die. She sends her brothers a runic message warning them about Atli, but the messenger Vingi alters it, inviting her brothers to come to Atli's hall. Hǫgni's wife Kostbera sees the message is false and tells him. She tells her dream to Hǫgni, in which she predicts the treachery of Atli and Hǫgni's death, but he does not believe her. Gunnar's wife Glaumvor also has symbolic dreams predicting Gunnar's betrayal by Atli and his death, but he eventually gives up trying to interpret them differently and simply concedes he will probably have a short life. Gunnar and Hǫgni go with Vingi to Atli. Vingi reveals he betrayed them, and Gunnar and Hǫgni kill him with their axe handles.

When they arrive, Atli says he wants Sigurd's gold and will avenge Sigurd by killing his brothers-in-law. Guðrún tries to stop the fighting, but then puts on armor, picks up a sword, and fights with her brothers. Many of Atli's champions are killed. Of their army, only Gunnar and Hǫgni survive and are captured. Hǫgni's heart is cut out and shown to Gunnar. Gunnar is placed in a snake pit, but Guðrún brings him a harp which he plays with his toes. All the snakes fall asleep except one, which bites his heart and kills him.

Guðrún and Atli hold a funeral feast. Later, Guðrún kills Atli's two sons and gives their blood and hearts to Atli to eat and drink. Atli says she deserves to be killed. Hǫgni's son Niflung wants to avenge his father, so he and Guðrún stab Atli while he is asleep. After he dies, Guðrún sets the hall on fire and all Atli's retainers die while fighting each other in panic.

=== Guðrún's last marriage ===
Guðrún and Sigurd's daughter is Svanhild, radiantly beautiful. Guðrún goes to the sea to drown herself after killing Atli, but she gets swept away to the court of King Jonakr, who marries her. They have three sons: Hamdir, Sorli, and Erp. Svanhild is raised with them.

King Jormunrek wants to marry Svanhild, but Bikki convinces Jormunrek's son Randver that he would be a better match for her than his father, so he and Svanhild marry. Upon Bikki's advice, Jormunrek hangs Randver and has horses trample Svanhild to death.

Guðrún encourages her sons to kill Jormunrek and avenge Svanhild. Her sons ask Erp if he will help them kill Jormunrek, but he gives an ambivalent answer they misunderstand as arrogance, so they kill him, coming to regret it afterwards. They meet Jormunrek and cut off his hands and feet, but Erp would have cut off Jormunrek's head, which would have kept Jormunrek from calling for his housecarls. The housecarls are unable to kill Guðrún's sons with sharp weapons. Odin then appears as an old one-eyed man and advises Jormunrek's housecarls to have the avengers killed with stones, which they do.

== Themes ==
=== Odin and the supernatural ===
Throughout the saga, elements of the supernatural are interwoven into the narrative. One recurring theme is the periodic appearance of Odin, the foremost among Norse deities, associated with "war, wisdom, ecstasy, and poetry". He is typically depicted as a mysterious, hooded old man with one eye.

Odin appears a number of times to assist characters with his magic and powers. At the start of the saga, he guides his son Sigi out of the underworld. He also sends a wish maiden to Sigi's son Rerir with an enchanted apple that finally allowed Rerir and his wife to have a child. Later, he appears as an old, one-eyed stranger and sticks his sword into the tree Barnstokkr during a feast at the palace of King Vǫlsung, declaring that "he who draws this sword out of the trunk shall receive it from me as a gift, and he himself shall prove that he has never carried a better sword than this one", which King Vǫlsung's son Sigmund does.

Odin also directly intervenes during key points in the narrative. During a battle, Odin, again in the guise of an old, one-eyed man, breaks Sigmund's sword, turning the tide of the battle and ultimately leading to his death. He also stabs Brynhild with a sleeping thorn and curses her never to win another battle as an act of revenge for killing Hjalmgunnar, a rival king to whom Odin had promised victory.

=== The ring Andvaranaut ===
In the latter half of the saga the ring Andvaranaut serves as a connection and explanation for the characters' troubles. Loki killed Ótr, the son of Hreidmar. As compensation for Ótr's death, Loki coerced a dwarf named Andvari into repaying the debt with gold. Andvari tried to hold onto one gold ring and when Loki forced him to give it up Andvari cursed the ring, saying, "This ring... and indeed the entire treasure, will be the death of whoever owns it." This plays out as one character after another is killed soon after they receive the ring. Ótr's brother Fáfnir killed his father in order to get the ring and then turned into a dragon to protect it. Sigurd then kills Fáfnir, taking the ring and giving it to Brynhild. The ring is then brought into Queen Grimhild's family after her children marry Sigurd and Brynhild. The story of the Andvaranaut is thought to have been one of the texts that inspired J.R.R Tolkien's The Lord of the Rings.

== Adaptations and related works ==
The Middle High German epic poem the Nibelungenlied is related in content. The relative historical accuracy and origin of both works are a subject of academic research—however, whilst traditionally the stories from the Poetic Edda and Vǫlsunga saga were assumed to contain an earlier or "more original" version, the actual development of the different texts is more complex—for more details see Nibelungenlied § Origins.

Among the more notable adaptations of this text are Richard Wagner's tetralogy of music dramas Der Ring des Nibelungen, Ernest Reyer's opera Sigurd, Henrik Ibsen's The Vikings at Helgeland, and William Morris's epic poem The Story of Sigurd the Volsung and the Fall of the Niblungs. J. R. R. Tolkien's The Legend of Sigurd and Gudrún is derived instead from the Vǫlsung poems in the Elder Edda, as Tolkien thought the author of the saga had made a jumble of things.

The saga is also one inspiration for Þráinn Bertelsson's satirical crime novel Valkyrjur (Reykjavík: JPV, 2005). Melvin Burgess similarly drew inspiration from the saga in his novel Bloodtide (1999) and its sequel Bloodsong (2007).

=== In popular media ===
A viking-themed videogame community for Mount & Blade II: Bannerlord, The Völsung Clan, is loosely based on this saga.

== Editions and translations ==
=== Editions ===
- Vǫlsunga saga, in Fornaldarsögur norðurlanda, ed. by Guðni Jónsson and Bjarni Vilhjálmsson, 3 vols (Reyjkjavík: Bókaútgáfan Forni, 1943–44)
- Finch, R. G., ed. (1965), The Saga of the Volsungs (PDF), London: Nelson , with Icelandic text
- Grimstad, Kaaren, ed. (2005) [2000], Vǫlsunga saga. The saga of the Volsungs. The Icelandic Text According to MS Nks 1824 b, 4 (2nd ed.), AQ-Verlag, Saarbrücken , English translation with Norse transcription from manuscript Nks 1824 b, 4°

=== English translations ===
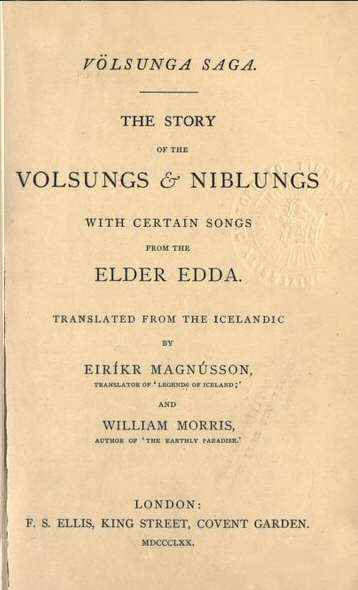
Translation by Eiríkr Magnússon and William Morris, 1870, published by F. S. Ellis

- Morris, William; Magnússon, Eirikr, eds. (1870), Völsunga Saga : The Story of the Volsungs & Niblings with certain songs from the Elder Edda , literal translation, e-text Archived 26 August 2018 at the Wayback Machine
- Schlauch, Margaret, ed. (1930), The Saga of the Volsungs: The Saga of Ragnar Lodbrok, Together with The Lay of Kraka
- Finch, R. G., ed. (1965), The Saga of the Volsungs (PDF), London: Nelson, archived (PDF) from the original on 21 November 2008 , with Icelandic text
- Anderson, George K., ed. (1982), The Saga of the Volsungs – together with Excerpts from the Nornageststháttr and Three Chapters from the Prose Edda
- Byock, Jesse L., ed. (1990), Saga of the Volsungs, University of California Press
- Grimstad, Kaaren, ed. (2005) [2000], Vǫlsunga saga. The saga of the Volsungs. The Icelandic Text According to MS Nks 1824 b, 4 (2nd ed.), AQ-Verlag, Saarbrücken , English translation with Norse transcription from manuscript Nks 1824 b, 4°
- Crawford, Jackson, ed. (2017), The Saga of the Volsungs with The Saga of Ragnar Lothbrok

=== Other translations ===
- Jonsson, Gudni; Vilhjalmsson, Bjarni (eds.), "Völsunga saga", Kulturformidlingen norrøne tekster og kvad (e-text) (in Old Norse, Norwegian, Danish, and Swedish), archived from the original on 23 April 2023, Norse text with translations by: A. Bugge (Norwegian, 1910); Winkel Horn (Danish, 1876), Nils Fredrik Sander (Swedish, 1893)

=== Literary retellings ===
- Morris, William, ed. (1877), The story of Sigurd the Volsung and the fall of the Niblungs, Boston, Roberts brothers , literary adaption
  - Some sections edited into prose in: Morris, William; Turner, Winifred; Scott, Helen, eds. (1922), The story of Sigurd the Volsung and the fall of the Niblungs
- Numerous retellings of aspects of the tales can be found, from this and other sources on the Volsungs—some have been adapted for children, such as the "Story of Sigurd" in Andrew Lang's "The Red Fairy Book"
