= Dvalinn =

Norse mythical character

In Norse mythology, Dvalinn (Old Norse: [ˈdwɑlenː]) is a dwarf (Hjort) who appears in several Old Norse tales and kennings. The name translates as "the dormant one" or "the one slumbering" (akin to the Danish and Norwegian "dvale" and Swedish "dvala", meaning "sleep", "unconscious condition" or "hibernation"). Dvalinn is listed as one of the four stags of Yggdrasill in Gylfaginning from the Prose Edda.

== Attestation ==
=== Poetic Edda ===
In the Poetic Edda poem Völuspá, Dvalinn is mentioned as a name in the listing of dwarves, and again in a later stanza as a leader taking a host of dwarfs from the mountains to find a new dwelling place:

"The rocks they left, and through wet lands
They sought a home, in the fields of sand"

In Hávamál, Dvalinn is said to have introduced the writing of runes to the dwarfs, as Dáinn had done for the elves, Óðinn for the gods, and Asvið for the jötnar.

In Alvíssmál, a kenning for the sun ,used by dwarves, is listed as the "deceiver of Dvalinn", referring to the sun's power of turning dwarfs into stone, or “Dvalinn’s toy”, possibly imagining the sun as gold, an element that dwarfs often work with. In skaldic poetry, "Dvalinn's drink" is used as a kenning for poetry, since the mead of poetry was originally created by the dwarfs.

In Fáfnismál, during a discussion between Sigurd and Fafnir concerning the minor Norns (apart from the three great Norns), those who govern the lives and destinies of dwarfs are also known as "Dvalinn's daughters".

=== Sagas ===
In Hervarar saga, the king Sigrlami corners the two Dwarves Durinn and Dvalinn, he threatens to kill them unless they make a him sword, they comply and made a beautiful sword that they named Svafrlami but , Dualinn told the king that the sword will kill someone every time it is drawn and would bring about his death. The king grew angry and attacked the dwarves, they escaped unharmed and, the king renamed the magical sword to tyrfing.

=== Prose Edda ===
In The Prose Edda Dvalinn is the name of one of the four stags that eat the leaves on the world tree in contrast the poetic edda says that there is only one stag eating the leaves.

=== Sörla þáttr ===
In the Sörla þáttr, an Icelandic short story written by two Christian priests in the 15th century, Dvalinn is the name of one of the four dwarves (including Alfrigg, Berling and Grer) who fashioned a necklace which was later acquired by a woman called Freyja, who is King Odin's concubine, after she agreed to spend a night with each of them.

=== Kálfsvísa ===
In the Kálfsvísa, Dvalinn is mentioned in a list of Norse heroes and their horses. Dvalinn rides a horse named Móðnir ("Spirited").

== Modern influence ==
J. R. R. Tolkien took the name as Dwalin for one of the dwarves in The Hobbit. Rich Burlew has Dvalin as the first king of the Dwarves, an ascended demigod of the Northern Pantheon in The Order of the Stick. In Joanne Harris' The Gospel of Loki, Dvalin is the name of one of the Sons of Ivaldi. In Genshin Impact, Dvalin is the name of one of the Four Winds in Mondstadt chosen by the God of the wind, Barbatos.
