= Helm of Awe =

Object in Norse mythology and modern magical stave

The Helm of Awe, or Helm of Terror (Old Norse: Ǿgishjalmr, Icelandic: Ægishjálmur), is an object in Norse mythology relating to the hoard protected by the worm Fáfnir and subsequently the name of a modern Icelandic magical stave.

== Etymology ==
The name is a compound of Old Norse: œgir, "one who frightens", stemming from agi, "awe, feeling of fear and reverence, reverent obedience through deterrent terror", and hjálmr, "helmet".

According to Alessia Bauer and Alexandra Pesch, the name is "commonly interpreted as 'helmet of awe' or 'helmet of terror'".

== Medieval attestations of the object ==
=== Völsunga saga ===
A physical object called the Ægishjálmur is referenced as one item Sigurðr takes from Fáfnir's hoard after he slays him in Völsunga saga.

=== Reginsmál ===
In the prose of Reginsmál, Fáfnir is described as owning the helm and that all living creatures feared it.

=== Fáfnismál ===
The object is also discussed in Fáfnismál in the Poetic Edda, here translated as "Fear-helm":

Old Norse text

Fáfnir kvað:

"Ægishjalm bar ek of alda sonum,
meðan ek of menjum lák;
einn rammari hugðumk öllum vera,
fannk-a ek svá marga mögu."

Sigurðr kvað:

"Ægishjalmr bergr einungi,
hvar skulu vreiðir vega;
þá þat finnr, er með fleirum kemr,
at engi er einna hvatastr."

Bellows translation

Fafnir spake:

The fear-helm I wore to afright mankind,
While guarding my gold I lay;
Mightier seemed I than any man,
For a fiercer never I found.

Sigurth spake:

"The fear-helm surely no man shields
When he faces a valiant foe;
Oft one finds, when the foe he meets,
That he is not the bravest of all."

In the next stanzas of the poem, Sigurðr refers to the helm again:

Old Norse text	Bellows translation
"Inn fráni ormr, þú gerðir fræs mikla ok galzt harðan hug; heift at meiri verðr hölða sonum, at þann hjalm hafi."	"Glittering worm, thy hissing was great, And hard didst show thy heart; But hatred more | have the sons of men For him who owns the helm."

== Bibliography ==
=== Primary ===
- Bellows, Henry Adam (2004). The Poetic Edda: The Mythological Poems. Mineola, NY: Dover Publications. ISBN 9780486437101.
- "Fáfnismál". heimskringla.no.

=== Secondary ===
- Storesund, Eirik. "Clubbing Solomon's Seal: The Occult Roots of the Ægishjálmur". Brute Norse.
