= Fáfnir =

Figure in Germanic heroic legend

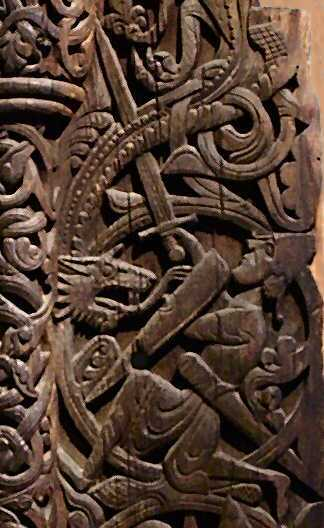
A depiction of Sigurð slaying Fáfnir on the right portal plank from Hylestad Stave Church, the so-called "Hylestad I", from the second half of the 12th century

In Germanic heroic legend and folklore, Fáfnir was a dwarf who had shapeshifted into a Germanic dragon (a worm or serpent) to protect a treasure, eventually being slain by one of the Völsungs, usually said to be Sigurð.

In Nordic mythology, Fáfnir is the son of Hreiðmarr and the brother of Regin and Ótr. He is attested throughout the Völsung Cycle, where he commits patricide out of greed, taking the ring and hoard of the dwarf Andvari and shapeshifting into a dragon. Fáfnir's brother, Regin, later assists Sigurð in obtaining the sword Gram by which Fáfnir is killed. Fáfnir has been identified with an unnamed dragon killed by a Völsung in other Germanic works, including Beowulf, the Nibelunglied and a number of skaldic poems. Fáfnir and his killing by Sigurð are further represented in numerous medieval carvings from the British Isles and Scandinavia, and a single axe head in a Scandinavian style found in Russia. The story of Fáfnir has continued its influence in modern literature, such as in the works of J.R.R Tolkien, who drew inspiration from the tale of Fáfnir in his portrayals of Smaug and Gollum.

== Etymology ==
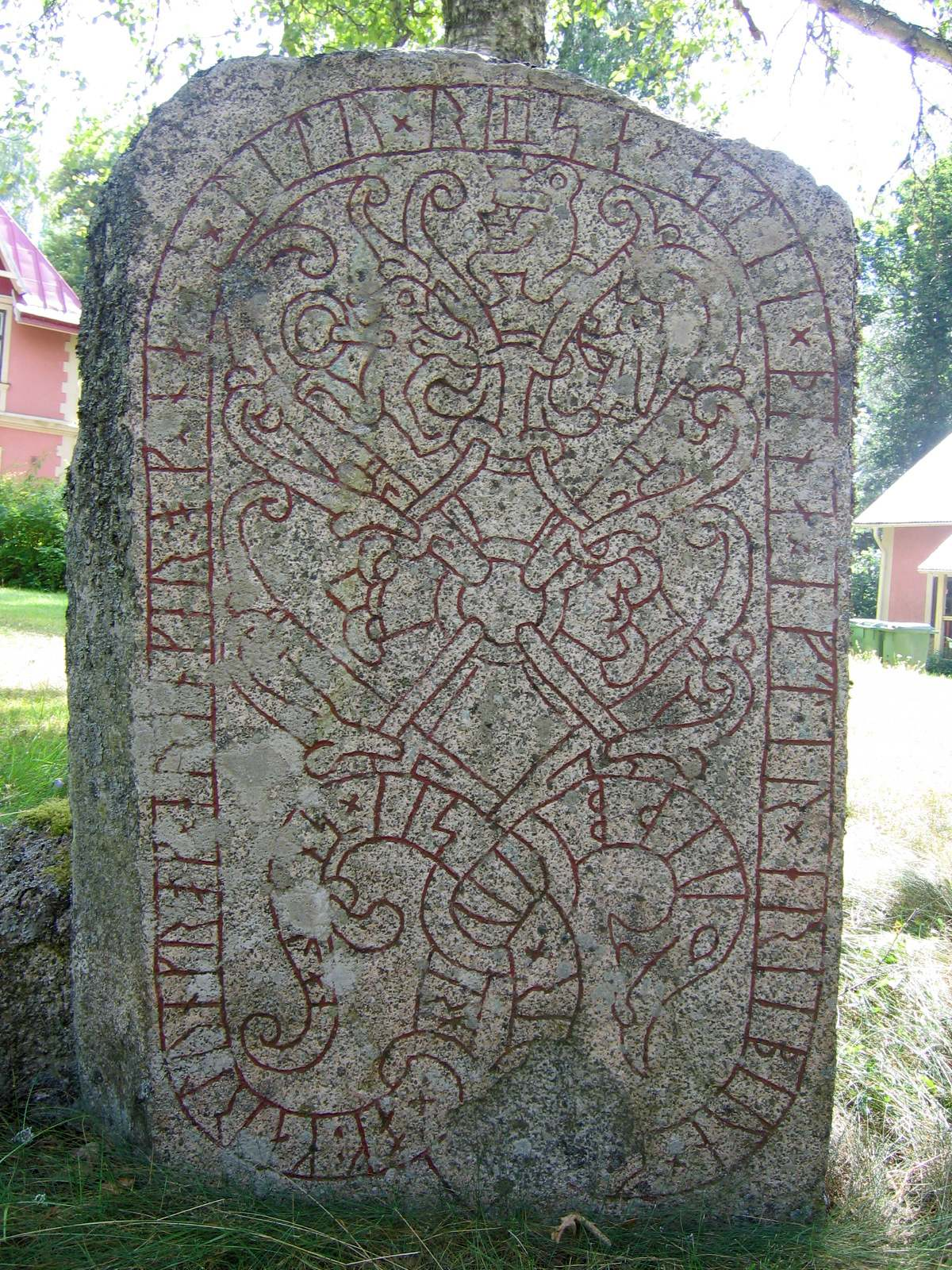
U 1163, the Drävle runestone, depicting Sigurð stabbing Fáfnir, who encircles the runestone.

The name "Fáfnir" has been translated from Old Norse as "the embracer", lit. 'the fathomer' (archaised: "fathomner"), stemming from the verb faðma ("fathom, embrace") with the inchoative verb-suffix -na and agent noun-suffix -ir. The spelling fáfn- stems from an excrescence following the m, introducing a short /b/ or /p/, in turn morphing into an /f/, thus something akin to *faðmnair → *faðmb͡hnair → *fahmb͡hnir → *fámhp͡hnir → fáfnir (compare Danish: favne, Old Swedish: fambna, fampna, from Old Norse: faðma). Cognates of faðmr (the noun of faðma), includes Old Saxon: fathmōs, Middle Low German: vadem, Dutch: vadem, vaam, Old Frisian: fethm, Old High German: fadam, fadum, German: faden, Old English: fæðm and English: fathom.

The name can be interpreted in various ways. It could potentially be a play on Fáfnir's worm-form. The root sense, "the one who embraces", could refer to the worm coiling around the treasure to brood over it, but a double entendre could also be "the one of many fathoms", referencing the measurement fathom, relating to the worm's massive length.

== Appearance ==
Before taking the form of a dragon, Fáfnir's appearance is not explicitly described. Although his brother, Regin, is described as being a dwarf in Norna-Gests þáttr and resembling a dwarf (Old Norse: dvergr of vǫxt), it is not clear if relatives of dwarves are also dwarves, nor is it clear how dwarves are conceived of as appearing. It has been noted that dwarf appearances were presented in the medieval period as highly diverse, and they could even change their form, as is the case with Andvari and potentially also Fáfnir.

While in the form of a worm in Fáfnismál, Fáfnir is described as flightless and snake-like. In the narrative of the later Völsunga saga, however, he has shoulders, suggesting legs, wings or both. This change is consistent with the wider trend in Germanic portrayals of dragons, and likely results from influence from continental Europe that was facilitated by Christianisation and the increased availability of translated romances.

== Named attestations ==
=== General narrative ===
Fáfnir's tale is attested in multiple medieval accounts which refer to a shared story with a general structure as follows:

- Fáfnir kills his father Hreiðmarr and takes his hoard of treasure that was often given as weregild by the gods Odin, Loki, and Hœnir for their unintended killing of Hreiðmarr's son Ótr.
- Fáfnir kills his father and flees with the hoard and dwells in the wilderness, often at a place named Gnitaheath, where he becomes a worm-dragon (Old Norse: ormr or dreki).
- Fáfnir's brother Regin forges a sword for Sigurð and convinces him to kill Fáfnir by hiding in a pit and striking him from below as the worm goes past, which Sigurð does.
- Regin asks him to cook the worm's heart for him to eat. As Sigurð does this, he checks to see if it is cooked by touching it, whereupon he burns his finger and sucks it to cool it down.
- The blood from the heart imparts to him the ability to understand birds, who he overhears talking about how Regin will betray him. Fearing this, Sigurð kills Regin and takes the treasure, loading it up on his horse Grani.

=== Poetic Edda ===
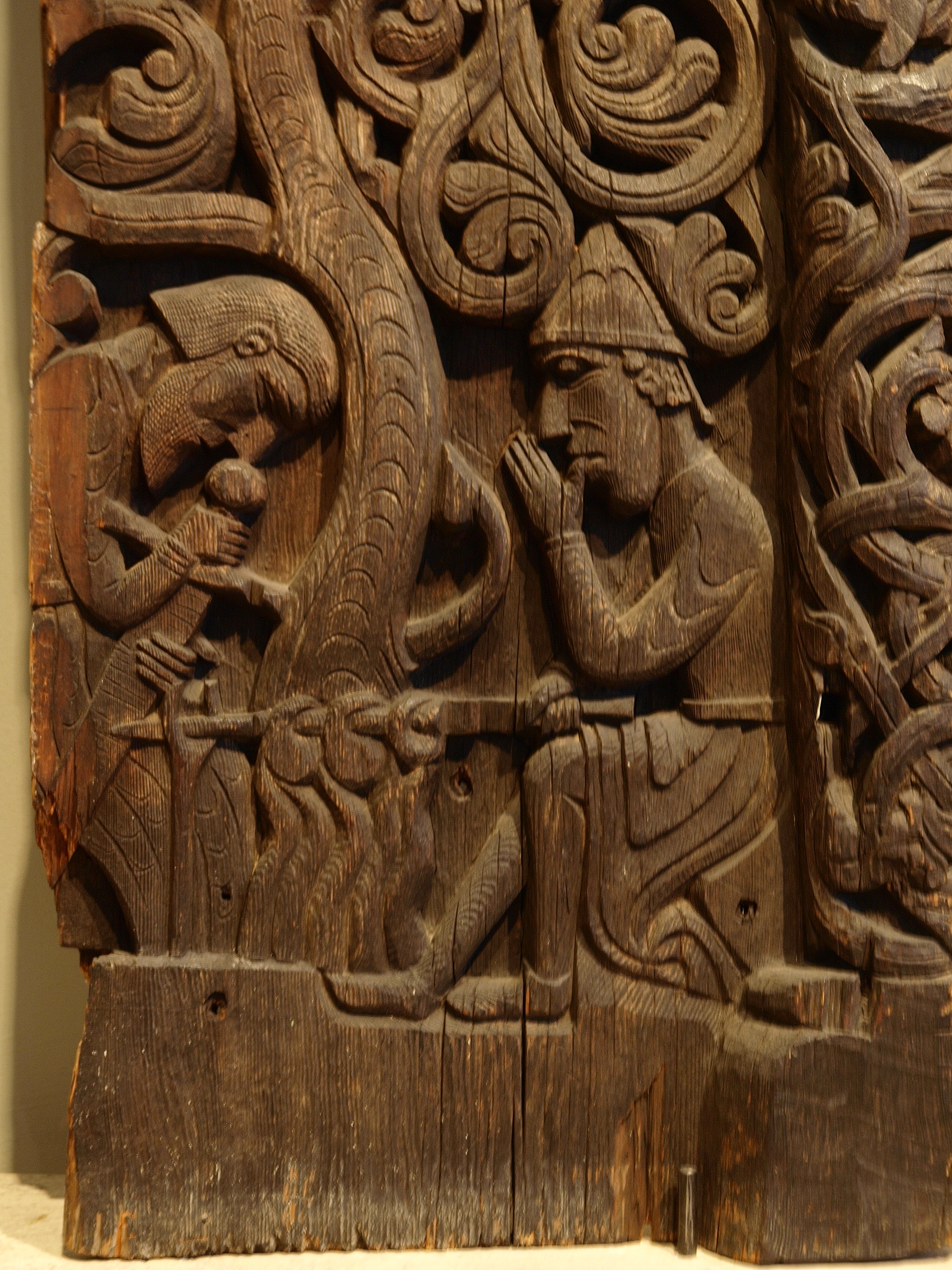
Sigurð sucking the Fáfnir's heart-blood off his thumb.

The Poetic Edda contains two poems that mention Fáfnir. In the prose of the first, Reginsmál, the eponymous figure Regin tells Sigurð that once Odin, Loki, and Hœnir went to the foss of the dwarf Andvari who lived there in the form of a pike. In that water also lived Fáfnir and Regin's brother, Ótr who was eating a salmon on the bank, in the shape of an otter. Loki killed Ótr with a stone and the gods skinned him before seeking lodgings at the house of Hreiðmarr, the father of Fáfnir and his siblings. Seeing the otter skin, the family seized the gods and demanded that the gods fill and cover the skin in red gold as weregild. Loki caught Andvari using Rán's net and extorts the gold from him. In the poem, Andvari curses the gold which the gods give to Hreiðmarr. Fáfnir and Regin asked their father for some of the weregild but he refused, leading Fáfnir to kill him. As he dies, Hreiðmarr calls out to his daughters Lyngheiðr and Lofnheiðr, but they take no action. Fáfnir then takes all the hoard, refusing to share it with his brother, and takes to Gnitaheath, where he took the shape of a worm. Along with Andvari's ring, Andvaranaut, the treasure here is described as including the Helm of fear (Old Norse: ægishjálmr).

In the second poem, Fáfnismál, the prose prologue describes Sigurð and Regin going to Gnitaheath, where they find the track Fáfnir made as he crawled to the water to drink. Sigurð digs a trench across the path and hides in it. Later, Fáfnir leaves his hoard, blowing out atter, and moves over Sigurð, who stabs him through the belly and into the heart. As the worm dies, the poem begins and consists of a conversation between him and Sigurð, in which Fáfnir asks for information about Sigurð, such as his name which he initially hides in riddles. Fáfnir then warns Sigurð against the gold, telling him that it will bring his death who responds, saying that a time will come for everyone to journey to hell. The poem moves to Fáfnir teaching Sigurð lore, such as the identity of the Norns and the island where the gods will meet with Surtr. Fáfnir then warns Sigurð of the hoard again before the worm dies. Regin then meets with Sigurð where they quarrel over who deserves the praise for the death of Fáfnir. Notably here, Regin refers to his brother as an "ancient jötunn". Regin then cuts out Fáfnir's heart with his sword Riðill and tells Sigurð to cook it for him while he sleeps. While cooking it on a spit, Sigurð tests to see if it is done but accidentally burns his finger in the process and sucks it, putting the heart's blood into his mouth. The blood allows Sigurð to understand seven birds who are talking nearby about how Regin is going to kill Sigurð and take the hoard for himself. Fearing they were right, Sigurð chops off Regin's head, eats Fáfnir's heart, then drinks the blood of both brothers. The following prose tells how Sigurð then followed Fáfnir's trail to his lair, which is described as a house dug down into the earth, the gates, gate posts and beams of which were all made of iron. Inside, Sigurð finds among the hoard the ægishjálmr, a golden mail coat and the sword Hrotti, and loads all of it onto his horse Grani's back.

=== Prose Edda ===
In the section of the Prose Edda, Skáldskaparmál, Snorri Sturluson describes the story of Fáfnir when explaining kennings for gold such as "Lair or abode of Fáfnir" and "Metal of Gnita Heath". This account tells of how Odin, Loki, and Hœnir were journeying when they came to a foss in which an otter was lying down eating a salmon. Loki killed it with a stone and they took both the otter and the fish with them as they walked. They came to a farm where lived Hreiðmarr with his sons, Regin and Fáfnir. The family recognised the otter skin as being their kinsman Ótr and bound the gods, who offered a ransom for their lives. It was agreed that the gods were to fill and cover the skin with red gold. The gods sent Loki to Svartálfaheim to gather the ransom which he fulfilled by coercing the dwarf Andvari to give up his gold and the ring, Andvaranaut. The treasure further included the sword Hrotti and the ægishjálmr, here explicitly referred to as a helm. As Loki left, Andvari cursed the ring and warned that the treasure would be the death of anyone who owned it.

In contrast to in Reginsmál, both the brothers kill their father when he refuses to share the gold and as in the poem, when Regin asked again to share the gold, Fáfnir threatened to kill him too. Fáfnir then leaves to Gnitaheath where he made a lair and took on the form of a worm. Regin left and began working as a smith for King Hjálprekr and began fostering Sigurð. He forged the sword Gram and gave it to Sigurð, encouraging him to kill Fáfnir and take the hoard. Following Regin's advice, Sigurð dug a pit along a path Fáfnir would take to take a drink and hid in it, waiting for him to pass over. As he did, Sigurð stabbed him and the dragon died without any further conversation. As a sign of thanks, Regin asks Sigurð if he could roast his brother's heart in a fire so the smith could eat it. Agreeing, Sigurð began cooking it, but as he did, he burnt his finger on it and sucked it. The juices from the heart gave him knowledge of the speech of birds. Snorri then quotes Fáfnismál, in which the birds tell Sigurð that Regin is planning to betray him. Heeding the birds' warning, Sigurð kills Regin and takes the hoard for himself and loads it onto his horse Grani.

=== Völsunga saga ===
Drawing of the Ramsund carving, depicting the story of Fáfnir

Völsunga saga presents the most cohesive and extensive account of the Sigurð tradition and its author likely had access to the Poetic Edda as a source.

Within it, Fáfnir's brother Regin recounts to his foster son Sigurð a story closely following the version in the Poetic and Prose Eddas, in which Odin, Loki, and Hœnir had to pay a large amount of gold as weregild for the killing of Ótr, who in this account is described as having the likeness of an otter by day. After the gods gave the gold to Hreiðmarr, Fáfnir killed his father Hreiðmarr to get all the gold for himself, venturing into the wilderness to keep his fortune. There he became ill-natured and greedy and so became a worm and took to ever lying on his treasure to protect it.

Plotting revenge to get the treasure, Regin sends Sigurð to kill the worm. Regin instructed Sigurð to dig a pit where he could lie in wait under the trail Fáfnir used to go to drink and stab him with the sword Gram as he crawls over the pit. Regin then ran away in fear, leaving Sigurð to the task. As Sigurð dug, Odin appeared as an old man with a long beard. He advised the warrior to dig more than one trench for the blood of Fáfnir to run into, and then disappeared. The earth shook as Fáfnir made his way to the stream, blowing poison before him. Sigurð, waiting in the hole below, stabbed Fáfnir in the left shoulder as he crawled over the ditch, mortally wounding the worm who thrashed about with his head and tail. As Fáfnir died, he spoke to Sigurð and asked for his name, his parentage, and who sent him on such a dangerous mission. Sigurð in return asks the dragon questions about lore as in Fáfnismál. During this, Fáfnir figured out that his brother, Regin, orchestrated his killing and foretold that the hoard would also cause Sigurð's death.

After Fáfnir's death, Sigurð cut the worm's heart out with the sword Riðill and Regin returns, drinking his brother's blood. Regin then asked if he could eat the heart, and agreeing, Sigurð roasted it on a spit. He touched it to check its doneness, and it burnt his finger. He stuck his finger in his mouth, and once Fáfnir's heart-blood touched his tongue, he became able to understand the speech of birds. He then overhears nearby birds warning him of Regin's treachery and advising him to eat the heart himself and kill Regin. Following their words, he ate some of Fáfnir's heart and saved some, before decapitating Regin with Gram.

=== Norna-Gests þáttr ===
In Norna-Gests þáttr, Norna-Gestr tells a brief version of the story of Fáfnir in which he visits the house of Regin where he hears Regin telling Sigurð about Fáfnir who is living in the form of a large worm in Gnitaheath. As in the other accounts, Regin makes the sword Gram and gives it to Sigurð, begging him to kill Fáfnir, which he does, although no further details are given of the deed. Because of this, Sigurð is referred to throughout the þáttr as Sigurð Fáfnisbane (Old Norse: Fáfnisbani).

=== Icelandic rune poem ===
In some manuscript versions of the Icelandic rune poem, the rune ᚠ (Fé) is described by the kenning Fáfnisbani ("Fáfnir's bane"), referring to the worm's possession of the hoard leading to his killing by Sigurð.

=== Leiðarvísir og borgarskipan ===
In Leiðarvísir og borgarskipan, an Old Norse travel account of a pilgrimage route from Iceland to the Holy Land. The author integrates into the journey accounts of Germanic lore, including locating Gnita-heath between Paderborn and Mainz and stating that this is where Sigurð killed Fáfnir. The position in which the author located Gnita-heath is unclear however it has been proposed to correspond to modern Niddagau or modern Knetterheide, though the latter toponym is only attested from the 17th century and is a significant distance from the location given in Leiðarvísir og borgarskipan.

== Unnamed attestations ==
A number of sources have been proposed by scholars to refer to Fáfnir and his killing, despite his name not featuring, based on similarities with named accounts of the story, such as his death at the hand of a Völsung or his stabbing from below.

=== Skaldic poetry ===
==== Þorfinnr munnra ====
Þorfinnr munnr is attributed with composing a lausavísa, recorded in Ólafssaga. In this account, Olaf asked him to compose a poem about a tapestry depicting the killing of Fáfnir hanging on the walls:

| Old Norse text | Modern English translation |
|---|---|
| Geisli stendr til grundar Gunnar jarðar munna; ofan fellr blóð á báðar benskeiðr, en gramr reiðisk. Hristisk hjǫrr í brjósti hringi grœnna lyngva, en folkþorinn fylkir ferr við steik at leika. | The sunbeam of the land of Gunnr (sword) stabs into the ground of jaws (head) blood flows down onto both wound-ships (swords), and the prince grows angry. The sword quivers in the breast of the ring of green heathers (serpent), and the battle-daring leader proceeds to amuse himself with roasting. |

==== Illugi bryndœlaskáld ====
The poetry of Illugi bryndœlaskáld about Harald Hardrada contain two stanzas about the death of Fáfnir. The first refers to the killing by Sigurð:

| Old Norse text | Gade translation |
|---|---|
| Vargs vas munr, þats margan — menskerðir stakk sverði myrkaurriða markar — minn dróttinn rak flótta. | It was the pleasure of the wolf that my lord put many to flight; the necklace-diminisher (generous man = Sigurðr) pierced the dark trout of the forest (serpent = Fáfnir) with the sword. |

The second describes the cooking of Fáfnir's heart:

| Old Norse text | Gade translation |
|---|---|
| Enn helt ulfa brynnir — eiskaldi gramr beisku mildr réð orms of eldi — austrfǫr þaðan gǫrva. | Again the thirst-quencher of wolves (warrior) embarked on a well-prepared expedition eastward; the generous ruler moved the bitter heart of the snake across the fire. |

==== Háttalykill ====
In a fragmentary stanza in Háttalykill, a reference is made to a worm being stabbed in the heart, which has been interpreted as Fáfnir:

| Old Norse text | Gade translation |
|---|---|
| †arðar† vatni blœtt of vísa †endi† heiðar hvals til hjarta | …bleeding with water above the leader… …to the heart of the whale of the heath (serpent)… |

=== Old English ===
The earliest known account of the Völsung tradition is the Sigemund episode in Beowulf, in which a thegn recalls the Wælsing (Old Norse: Völsung) Sigemund killing, with a sword, an unnamed worm that was guarding a hoard of treasure. This worm is typically identified with, or seen as the English form of, Fáfnir, however the Sigemund episode differs from later Old Norse accounts that attribute to Sigurð the killing.

The discrepancy in killer has been variously proposed by scholars to be due to the Beowulf account representing an older version of the story, the Beowulf author making a mistake, or the existence of parallel traditions.

=== Continental Germanic ===
The tradition of a dragon-killing Völsung is also found in the continental Germanic record. In Nibelungenlied, Sigefried (Old Norse: Sigurð) kills a dragon to obtain its hoard and in this version, rather than gaining knowledge through the dragon's heart-blood, he bathes in the dragon's blood to harden his skin and protect him from weapons. Similar to the account in Beowulf, this dragon is normally viewed by scholars as the German equivalent of Fáfnir.

=== Þiðreks saga ===
Þiðreks saga gives an account of Sigurð killing a dragon that shows similarities with both Old Norse and continental accounts, consistent with the saga being written in Norway but likely being based on earlier German material. In this telling, a smith Mymmer tries to have Sigurð killed by sending him into the woods where his brother Regin lived as a dragon. When he found the dragon, Sigurð killed it with his axe, cutting off its head. Hungry, he then boiled meat from the dead dragon but burnt his finger in the process, and so put his finger in his mouth. The juices from the meat made him able to understand the speech of birds, who he overhears telling him to kill Mymmer as he tried to have Sigurð killed. Sigurð then bathes in the dragon-blood which made his skin as hard as horn, except for where a maple leaf had stuck to him between his shoulders. Carrying the dragon head back to Mymmer, who offered gifts to make up for his ill deed, including armour made for King Herding in Nogard, the horse Grane and the sword Gram. Accepting these gifts, Sigurð then kills Mymmer and leaves to seek the maiden Brynilla.

== Medieval depictions ==
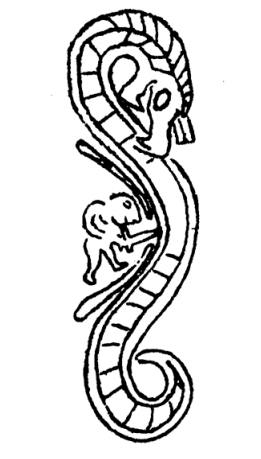
Sigurð killing Fáfnir, from the Jurby cross on the Isle of Man

Fáfnir's killing is depicted in a large number of carvings in Northern Europe, although some identifications are not agreed on by scholars, with the principal distinction from other dragon slayers typically being the stab from below, sometimes from a pit. Identifications are sometimes further supported by surrounding imagery consistent with the story of Fáfnir, and comparisons with other depictions.

Some Sigurd stones depict scenes from the story of Fáfnir. Most commonly, Fáfnir is presented as a worm that encircles the stone and is killed by Sigurð, who is shown stabbing from beneath. In the case of the Ramsund and Gök stones, images of the wider story are present, such as the cooking of Fáfnir's heart, the speaking birds and the killing of Regin (who is identified by the nearby tools, referencing his role as a smith). The sucking of Sigurð's finger also features in depictions both in Sweden and the British Isles, where it is typically his thumb that is sucked, though this is proposed to be due to increased pictorial distinctiveness, rather than of specific importance to the story. In the Isle of Man, the stone cross from Jurby depicts Fáfnir as he is stabbed and the cross from Maughold depicts Sigurð cooking his heart. In Telemark in Norway, Fáfnir is depicted being stabbed from below by Sigurð on a 12th-century capital from Lunde and the base of a pillar from Nes church, dating to the second half of the 12th century. Carvings in the Hylestad Stave Church depict the story of Fáfnir, including his death and the roasting of his heart. One example survives from Denmark, from Låsby and outside of the British Isles and Scandinavia, an axe of Scandinavian style found in Vladimir Oblast in Russia likely shows the death of Fáfnir.

Potential depictions of Fáfnir include carvings on three other crosses from the Isle of Man, a now lost cross fragment, with a similar artistic style, from the church at Kirby Hill in England, and a number of Swedish runestones such as that found in Årsunda.

== Interpretation and discussion ==
=== Christian reception ===
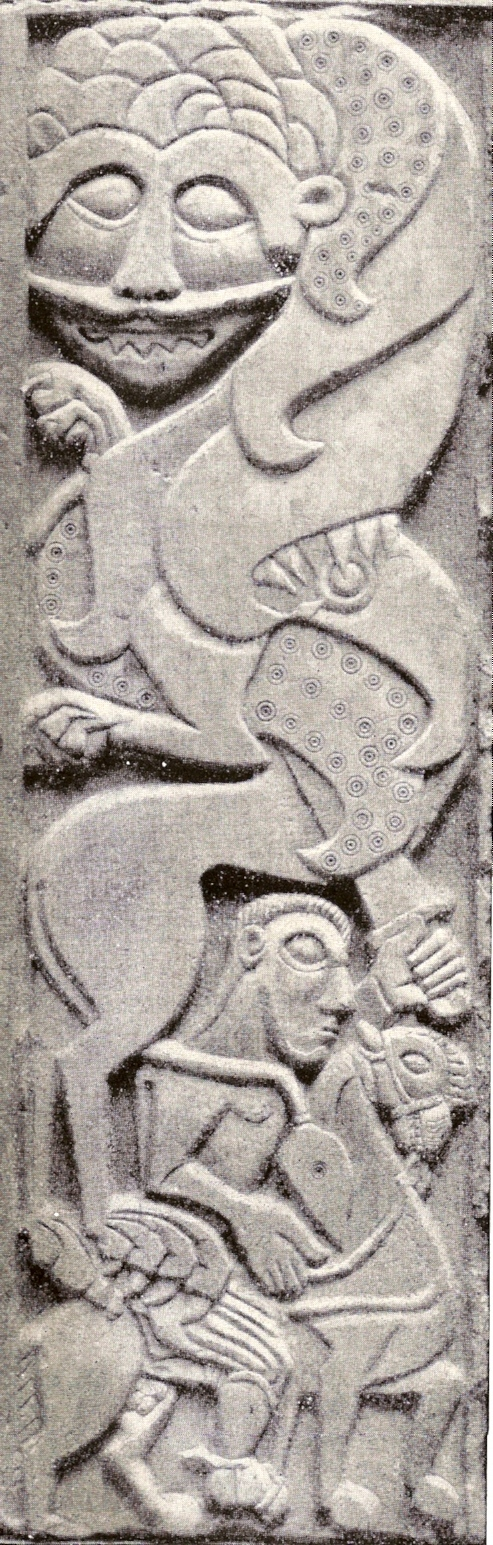
Norman relief of St. George and the Dragon, Aversa Cathedral, Italy (11th century).

Scholars have debated the reception and presentation of the tale of Fáfnir and how this relates to its continued popularity after the establishment of the church in Scandinavia, despite its heathen origin. It has been suggested that the tale was presented as principally historical and separate from its heathen origins. Furthermore, similarities have been noted between the role of Sigurð and of the archangel Michael, who struggles with the serpent of the Apocalypse, and of St. George, who also slays a dragon. It has thus been suggested that Sigurð was presented by Christian authorities as a soldier of Christ who triumphs over evil in the form of Fáfnir, rather than the earlier narrative components of gold, a curse and revenge. In some cases, he was likely identified with Jesus or Michael, in a form of adaptation of Christianity to local traditions to facilitate conversion from Old Nordic religion.

A further, and not mutually exclusive, proposal is that images of Sigurð and Fáfnir were used in England as ancestry claims by Tostig, Earl of Northumbria, who claimed descent from Sigurð. It has been noted, however, that others claimed descent from Sigurð and that the popularity of Sigurð extended beyond Tostig's lands. Alternatively, the carvings may seek to praise a dead person by comparing him to an ancient hero.

== Cultural influence ==
=== In Wagner ===
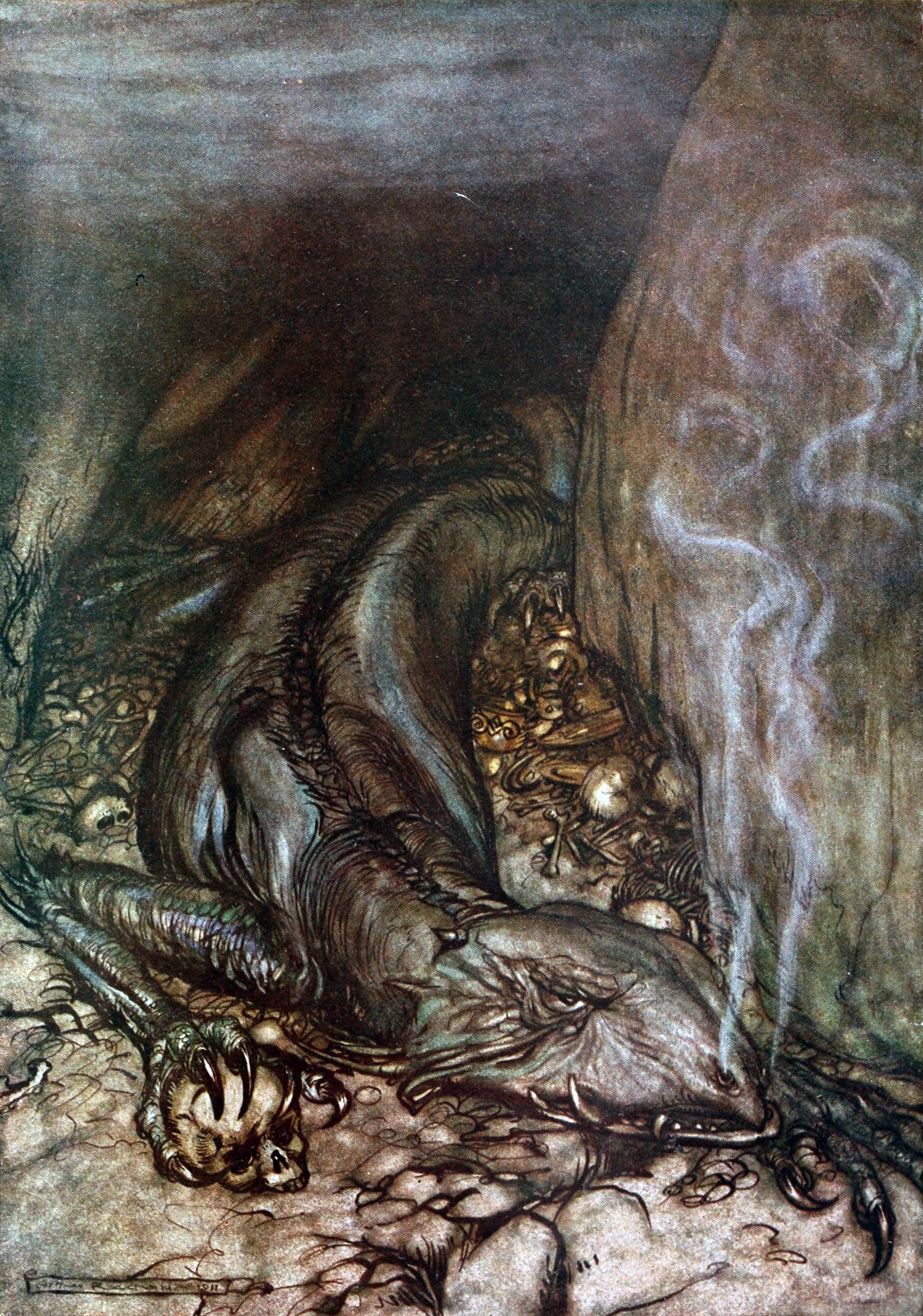
Fáfnir guards the gold hoard in this illustration by Arthur Rackham to Richard Wagner's Siegfried.

Fáfnir appears with the spelling "Fafner" in Richard Wagner's epic opera cycle Der Ring des Nibelungen (1848–1874), although he began life as a giant rather than a dwarf. In the first opera, Das Rheingold (1869), which has some basis in Gylfaginning, Fafner and his brother Fasolt try to kidnap the goddess Freia, a composite of the goddesses Freyja and Iðunn, who has been promised to them by Wotan, the king of the gods, in exchange for building the castle Valhalla. Fasolt is in love with her while Fafner wants her as without her golden apples the gods will lose their youth. The giants, mainly Fafner, agree to accept a massive hoard of treasure stolen from the dwarf Alberich instead. The treasure includes the magic helmet Tarnhelm and a magic ring. As they divide the treasure, the brothers argue and Fafner kills Fasolt and takes the ring for himself. Escaping to Earth, he uses the Tarnhelm to transform himself into a dragon and guards the treasure in a cave for many years before being ultimately killed by Wotan's mortal grandson Siegfried as depicted in the opera of the same name. However, while Fasolt is a romantic revolutionary, Fafner is a more violent and jealous figure, plotting to overthrow the gods. In many productions, he is shown to return to his original giant form while delivering his death-speech to Siegfried.

=== As inspiration for Tolkien ===
Much of J.R.R. Tolkien's work was inspired by Northern European mythology. Many parallels can be drawn between Fáfnir and Smaug, the main antagonist of The Hobbit. The exchange between Smaug and Bilbo Baggins nearly mirrors Fáfnir's and Sigurð's. The main difference is that Sigurð's conversation occurs after the death blow has been struck. This is most likely due to dramatic effect, as Bilbo has much more at stake when speaking with Smaug.

Glaurung, another dragon featured in Tolkien's legendarium, has many similarities to Fáfnir as well. In Tolkien's The Book of Lost Tales, Glaurung is described as a flightless dragon that hoards gold, breathes poison, and has "Great cunning and wisdom". In Tolkien's book The Children of Húrin, he is slain by Turin Turambar from below, much like Fáfnir. Turin and Glaurung also have an exchange after the mortal blow is dealt.

Fáfnir's downfall due to obsessive greed is also mirrored in Tolkien's character Gollum, who appears in The Hobbit and The Lord of the Rings. Both are driven to murder out of lust for treasure (in both cases, a magical ring) and flee into exile to hoard it. As with Fafnir, that which Gollum so covets proves to be his curse. Both characters are seen devolving into wicked creatures, living only to guard the treasures that have consumed their minds, until that which is so valuable to them finally leads to their own destruction.

=== Other ===
- In 2015, the star designated 42 Draconis was named Fafnir by the International Astronomical Union.
- Fáfnir was depicted in Marvel Comics' Thor series, as "Fafnir".
- Fáfnir appears in the 2018 video game God of War, in which he and his siblings Reginn and Otr (also turned into dragons) are imprisoned and must be freed in a side quest.
- Fáfnir appears as a recurring character in the manga series and anime Miss Kobayashi's Dragon Maid.
- Fáfnir appears as a stamina type beyblade in the anime Beyblade Burst Evolution, owned by Free de la Hoya.
- French neofolk group Skáld's 2023 song "Hinn Mikli Dreki" is centred on the figure of Fafnir.
- The Science Museum of Minnesota's Triceratops skeleton was named Fafner by Friedelind Wagner, Richard Wagner's granddaughter, at its dedication in 1966.
- Fáfnir appears as a playable character in the video game Smite, a free-to-play, third-person multiplayer online battle arena (MOBA).
- "Fafner's Gold", the opening track from the 2019 album Berserker by Swedish melodic death metal band Amon Amarth, tells a stripped back story of Fáfnir. Vocalist Johan Hegg actually used this Wikipedia article as his primary source.
- Fighting Fefnir (Note: Japanese: ロックマンゼロ, Hepburn: Tōshō Fābuniru; lit. 'Fighting General Fáfnir') is a recurring character in the Mega Man Zero video game series.
- Several bosses in the Japanese Final Fantasy series are named Fafnir.
- Fafnir can be trained as a myth unit in the 2024 video game Age of Mythology: Retold by choosing the major god Freyr and worshipping Vidar in the Mythic Age.
- Fafnir appears in the Japanese Shin Megami Tensei video game series, starting in Megami Tensei II. It also appears in the series's spin-off, Persona, starting in Persona 5 Royal. In both series, Fafnir can be captured and used by the player.

== See also ==
- Salmon of Knowledge – a fish in Irish folklore that gave knowledge once eaten, similar to Fáfnir
