= Otr (mythological character) =

Dwarf of Norse mythology

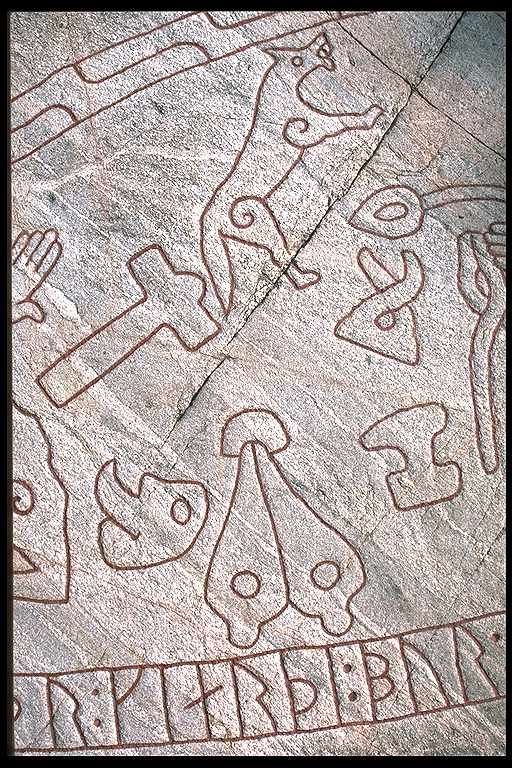
Ótr on the Ramsund carving in Södermanland, c. 1030

In Norse mythology, Otr (Old Norse: [ˈotz̠]; alternately: Ott, Oter, Ottar, Ottarr, Otter) is a dwarf. He is the son of the king Hreidmar and the brother of Fafnir and Regin.

According to the Prose Edda, Otr could change into any form and used to spend his days in the shape of an otter, greedily eating fish. In this form, he was slain by Loki, who wanted his pelt. Initially, Hreiðmarr demanded a life for a life, but with the argument that the murder had been an accident when no one involved knew that Otr was a dwarf, he settled for receiving a large weregild for Otr's death, namely to fill Otr's skin with yellow gold and to then cover it entirely with red gold. When the skin was covered, one whisker still protruded, forcing Loki to give up the ring Andvaranaut to hide it. The ring had been stolen from, and cursed by, the dwarf Andvari. It is suggested that this story was meant to show the benefits of not only adhering to the letter of the law (repayment for manslaughter) but sticking to the spirit of the law as well (not demanding an exorbitant ransom). Greed for this cursed treasure ultimately caused the deaths of Hreiðmarr and his two surviving sons: Hreiðmarr was killed by Fáfnir, who transformed into a dragon, and the other two were slain by Sigurðr's sword Gramr.
