= Hreiðmarr =

Norse mythical character

In Norse mythology, Hreiðmarr (Old Norse: [ˈhrɛiðˌmɑrː]; anglicized as Hreidmar) is a dwarf. He is featured in the Völsunga saga and in Snorri Sturluson's Prose Edda.

Hreiðmarr was the father of Regin, Fafnir, Ótr, Lyngheiðr and Lofnheiðr. He owned a house of glittering gold and flashing gems built by Regin and guarded by Fafnir. After Otr was accidentally killed by Loki, the Æsir repaid Hreiðmarr with Andvari's gold and the ring Andvaranaut, a magical ring that could create gold. However, Andvari had cursed the ring to bring misfortune and destruction to whoever else possessed it. Hreiðmarr ignored Loki's warnings about the curse and kept the ring, only to have Fafnir and Regin later kill him for it. Fafnir decided he wanted Andvaranaut for himself, so he turned into a dragon and drove Regin away. Fafnir guarded the treasure until Sigurd, on Regin's instigation, arrived and delivered a fatal blow to the dragon. Regin was then also killed by Sigurd while attempting to murder him for the ring, thus leaving all of Hreiðmarr's family dead.

== See also ==
- Völsung Cycle

== Other sources ==
- Byock, Jesse L. (1990) Saga of the Volsungs: The Norse Epic of Sigurd the Dragon Slayer (University of California Press) ISBN 0-520-23285-2
- Orchard, Andy (1997) Dictionary of Norse Myth and Legend (Cassell & Co) ISBN 0-304-34520-2
