= 2006 Orange High School shooting =

School shooting in North Carolina, United States

Orange High School shooting
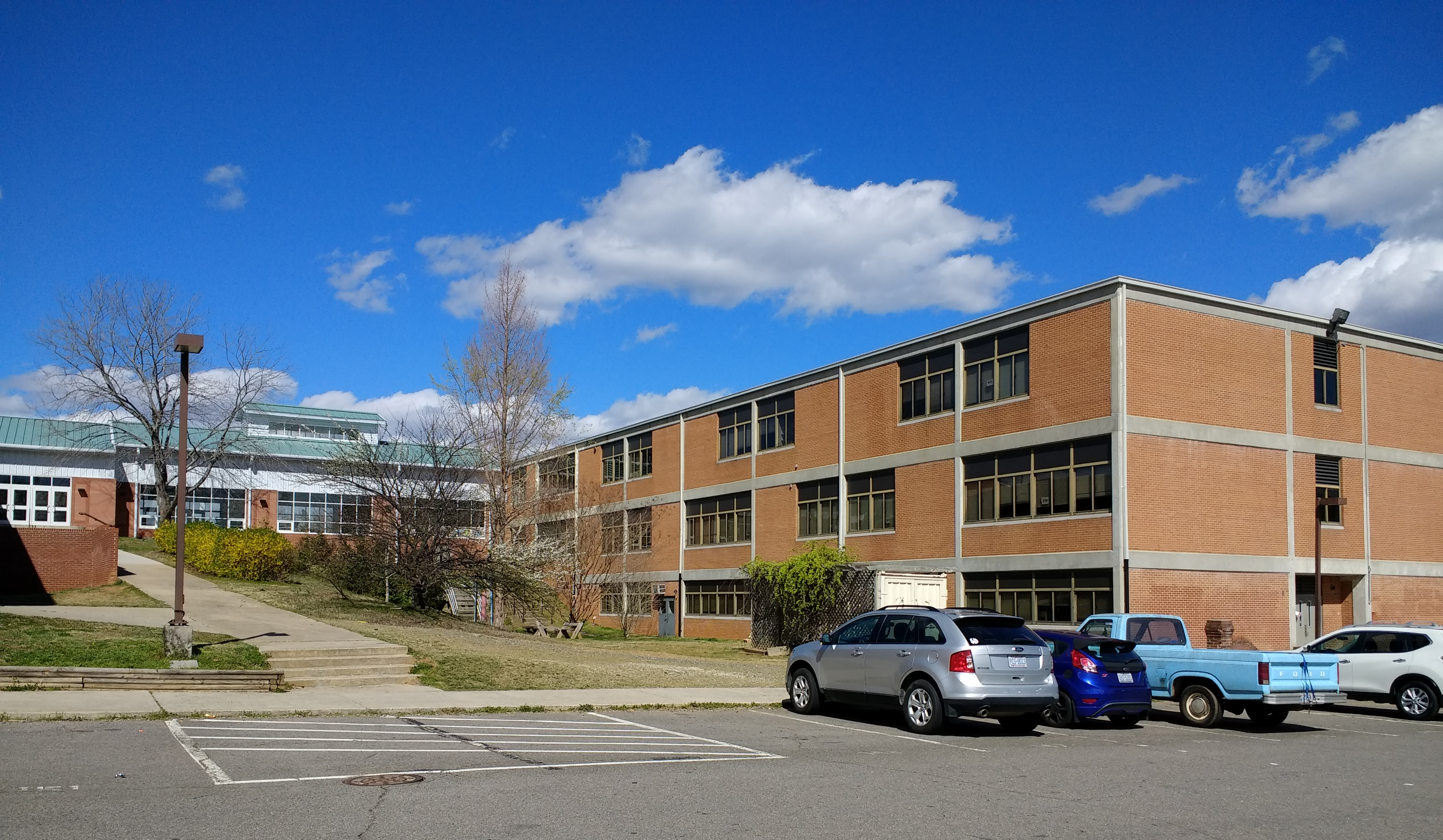
- Orange High School, pictured in 2017
- Location: Hillsborough, North Carolina, U.S.
- Date: August 30, 2006
- Target: Students and staff at Orange High School
- Attack type: School shooting, patricide
- Weapons: 9mm Hi-Point 995 carbine; 12-gauge Mossberg 500 shotgun (sawed-off); Cherry bomb; Pipe bombs (unused); Smoke bombs (unused)
- Deaths: 1 (perpetrator's father at home)
- Injuries: 2 (1 by gunfire)
- Perpetrator: Alvaro Rafael Castillo
- Motive: Attempt to "sacrifice" students into heaven; Columbine High School massacre copycat crime
- Verdict: Guilty
- Convictions: First-degree murder; Assault with a deadly weapon with intent to kill (two counts); Having a weapon on educational property (two counts); Possessing weapons of mass destruction (three counts); Firing into occupied property; Discharging a weapon on educational property
- Sentence: Life imprisonment without the possibility of parole, plus 6.5 years
- Judge: Allen Baddour

On August 30, 2006, a school shooting occurred at Orange High School in Hillsborough, North Carolina, United States, when 18-year-old Alvaro Rafael Castillo, a former student of the school, opened fire at the institution after shooting his father dead at home. After wounding two students (one directly and one by glass shards), his rifle jammed, at which point he was arrested at gunpoint. In 2009, Castillo was found guilty of first-degree murder after a three-week trial and was subsequently sentenced to life in prison with no chance of parole.

== Events ==
On August 30, 2006, Castillo murdered his father, Rafael Castillo, shooting him seven times in the neck and head. He had sent a written letter and videotape to the Chapel Hill News prior to the shooting that made reference to school shootings, and an e-mail to the principal of Columbine High School saying "Dear Principal, In a few hours you will probably hear about a school shooting in North Carolina. I am responsible for it. I remember Columbine. It is time the world remembered it. I am sorry. Goodbye." He then drove the family minivan to Orange High School.

At the institution, he set off a cherry bomb and then opened fire with a 9mm Hi-Point 995 carbine and a sawed-off 12-gauge Mossberg 500 shotgun. When his carbine jammed, he was apprehended by a deputy sheriff assigned to the school and a retired highway patrol officer who taught driver's education. Two students were injured in the attack, but none were killed. One was grazed by a bullet and another one was injured by shards of glass.

When he was arrested in the school's parking lot, he wore a t-shirt with the phrase, "Remember Columbine". He also made the statement "Columbine, remember Columbine," referring to the attack at Columbine High School in Colorado in 1999.

Along with his two firearms, he carried several homemade pipe bombs and smoke bombs, which were unused in the attack.

== Perpetrator ==
Alvaro Rafael Castillo (born November 6, 1987) was identified as the perpetrator. His father was born in El Salvador and his mother, whose family had a history of serious mental health issues was born in Spain. At age eight, Castillo became traumatized after a friend showed him online pornography, after which he started binge eating, watching violent movies, and became socially isolated, to cope with feelings of guilt. He was obsessed with the Columbine High School massacre and other similar school shootings.

Castillo had a documented history of mental health issues, obsessing over feelings of being watched, cleaning the house, and checking all the doors to make sure they were locked. On April 20, 2006, he had attempted suicide on the anniversary of the Columbine attack, though he was stopped by his father. He allegedly saw this as a "sign" to go forth and commit a school massacre, not out of any grudge against the school, but instead as a "sacrifice" to send the students and staff to heaven. He had a troubled relationship with his father Rafael Huezo Castillo, who had been long described as being strict and physically abusive.

== Legal proceedings ==
Castillo entered a plea of not guilty by reason of insanity. His defense argued that although Castillo understood that his actions were legally wrong, he still believed them to be morally correct. On August 21, 2009, Castillo was found guilty in Orange County Superior Court following a trial that lasted three weeks. He was sentenced to life in prison without the possibility of parole, along with an extra 78 months' imprisonment for all other charges. In 2011, he tried appealing his sentence.
