= Fáfnismál =

Eddic poem

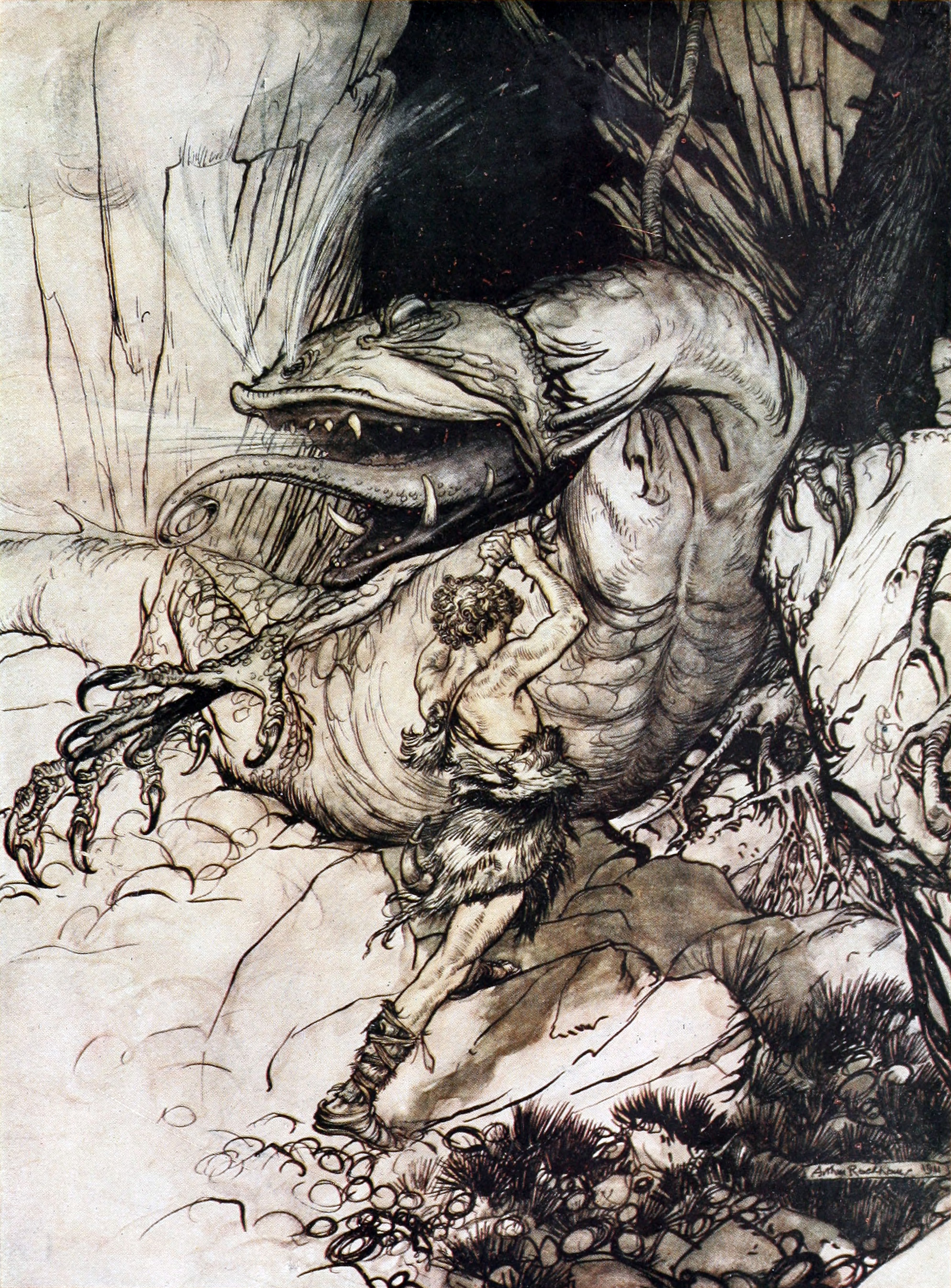
Sigurd plunges his sword into Fáfnir's chest in this illustration by Arthur Rackham.

Fáfnismál (Fáfnir's sayings) is an Eddic poem, found in the Codex Regius manuscript. The poem is unnamed in the manuscript, where it follows Reginsmál and precedes Sigrdrífumál, but modern scholars regard it as a separate poem and have assigned it a name for convenience.

The poem forms a more coherent whole than Reginsmál. Most of it is composed in ljóðaháttr, though nine stanzas deviate from the form. The first part of the poem is a dialogue between Sigurd and Fáfnir. The poem moves on to Sigurd's slaying of Fáfnir, dealings with Reginn and claiming of the gold hoard.

== Synopsis ==
Fafnismal begins with Reginn egging on Sigurd to slay Fáfnir, a golden hoard guarding dragon. Sigurd hides in a pit near Fafnir's lair and springs out of it stabbing Fáfnir in the heart. Fáfnir, mortally wounded, converses with Sigurd in riddle-like conversation. Initially, Sigurd withholds his name because it was a belief that a mortally wounded man had special powers if he cursed his slayer by name. Fáfnir then answers Sigurd's questions of wisdom about the gods. Before dying, Fáfnir warns Sigurd that his golden hoard is cursed and that Reginn will betray him. Reginn praises Sigurd for slaying the dragon, but takes credit for making the sword that allowed him to do it. Sigurd replies saying courage is more important than a weapon and blames Reginn for tricking him into killing Fáfnir. Reginn cuts out Fáfnir's heart and drinks the blood, and Sigurd cooks the heart over the fire for Reginn to eat. Sigurd accidentally ingests Fáfnir's blood and gains the ability to understand birds. He overhears the birds saying he should eat the heart for wisdom. Sigurd also hears them say Reginn will betray him. He decapitates Reginn in anticipation, eats Fáfnir's heart, and drinks both Reginn and Fáfnir's blood. The birds then tell him of his future wife Guðrún, and suggest he use the golden hoard to win her hand. They also tell of an imprisoned Valkyrie named Brynhildr. Sigurd loads two chests with gold, takes the Helm of Terror, and takes the sword Hrotti.

== The Hobbit ==
There are striking similarities between J.R.R. Tolkien's Smaug and Fáfnir. According to Ármann Jakobsson, Tolkien translates the epic poem into a modern representation of Fáfnir through Smaug. Fáfnir and Smaug are most alike in that they speak in riddles, have wisdom, and guard golden hoards. They also are very human-like, unlike dragons from other stories such as Beowulf. Further, Tolkien makes a point to show that the master of Esgaroth “fell under the dragon sickness” and died. This is similar to Fáfnir's transformation from human to dragon in order to protect his own hoard. Tolkien clearly draws inspiration from Fáfnismal for both Smaug and greed in The Hobbit. Another similar representation of a talking Dragon written by Tolkien and clearly inspired in part by Fafnir and certainly by the larger Volsungr Saga is that of Glaurung, found in his work "The Silmarillion" (and now edited as a separate work by his son Christopher as The Children of Hurin). The Dragon Glaurung also speaks, uses curses and magic but most similar is the death of Glaurung by Turin Turambar stabbed from below with a cursed sword.
