= Gram (mythology) =

Legendary sword owned by Sigurd

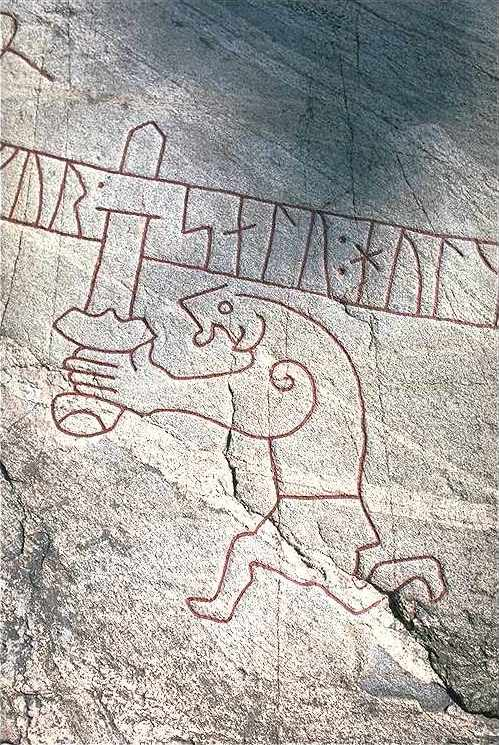
A depiction of Sigurd with Gram on the Ramsund carving, dated to around the year 1030

In Germanic mythology, Gram in Norse legend (Old Norse: Gramr, "ill-tempered"), or Balmung in the Middle High German epic poem Nibelungenlied, is a magical godlike sword, specifically the sword that the hero Sigurd used to kill the dragon Fafnir. It is primarily used by the Völsungs in the Völsung Cycle, however, it is also seen in other legends, such as the Thidrekssaga in which it is wielded by Hildebrand.

The myth of Gram may be related to the British myth of "the sword in the stone", Excalibur, as Gram has been thrust into a tree, from which only the hero Sigmund can pull it out, much like how Excalibur only can be pulled out by the true king of England, King Arthur. The myth of Gram being broken and then reforged was also the inspiration of Tolkien's sword Narsil.

In Richard Wagner's work, Der Ring des Nibelungen (The Ring of the Nibelung), it is referred to as Nothung ([ˈnoːtʊŋ], "child of need").

== Etymology ==
=== Gram ===
The name Gram of Norse myth (Old Norse: Gramr) is an old Germanic adjective related to the word grim (Old Norse: grimr), meaning "ill-tempered, wroth, angry, frightful, resentful", in extension "grim, wicked, cruel, fierce"; also used with preposition against or at something, as in, one could be "gram at something", etc. In Old Norse it was gramr (Icelandic: gramur; Old Swedish: gramber, Swedish: gram; Danish: gram), in Old English gram (Middle English: gram), as well as in Old Saxon and Old High German (German: gram), etc.

=== Balmung ===
The name Balmung of Old High German myth is unclear in its meaning. It has been suggested by Albert Schott in 1842 and Elard Hugo Meyer in 1883 to stem from the word balm ("cavern, grotto") with the suffix -ung ("-ing"), then roughly "Caveling, Son of the Cavern", as the sword in Nibelungenlied initially was the sword of the king of the Nibelungs, which lived in a country underground. In the German language, Balm is recorded in the dictionary Deutsches Wörterbuch, albeit, said to stem from Medieval Latin balma of the same meaning (Italian: balma). However, the word is Gaulish in root, and exist in various European dialects: Catalan: balma, bauma ("shallow cave, opening under a ledge"); Lombard: balma; French: baume ("grotto"); Occitan: baumo; Piedmontese: barma; Ligurian: arma, etc.

== Description ==
Nowhere in the Völsunga saga is a clear description of Gram given, but there is enough scattered throughout the story to draw a picture of the sword. Sigurd's weapons, Gram included, are described as being "all decked with gold and gleaming bright". Depending on how the text is read, the sword may or may not have a dragon emblazoned on it and/or depending on the translation have been "brown of hue".

== History ==
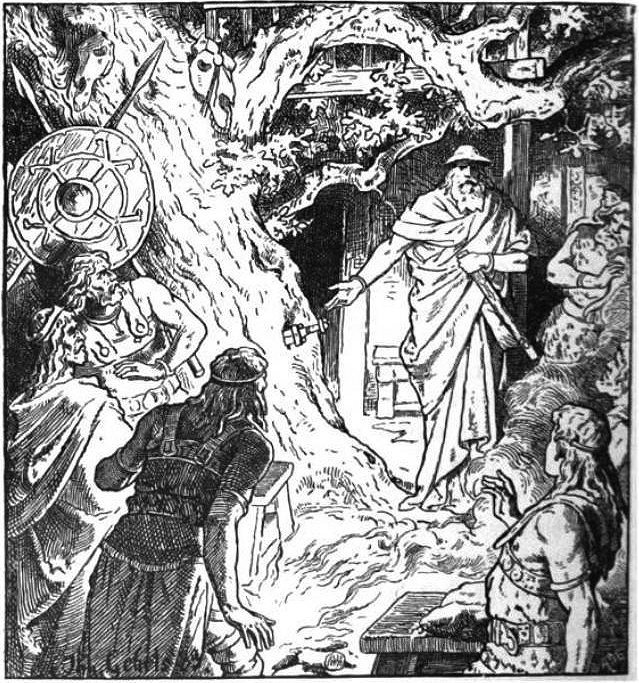
Sigmund's Sword by Johannes Gehrts (1889)

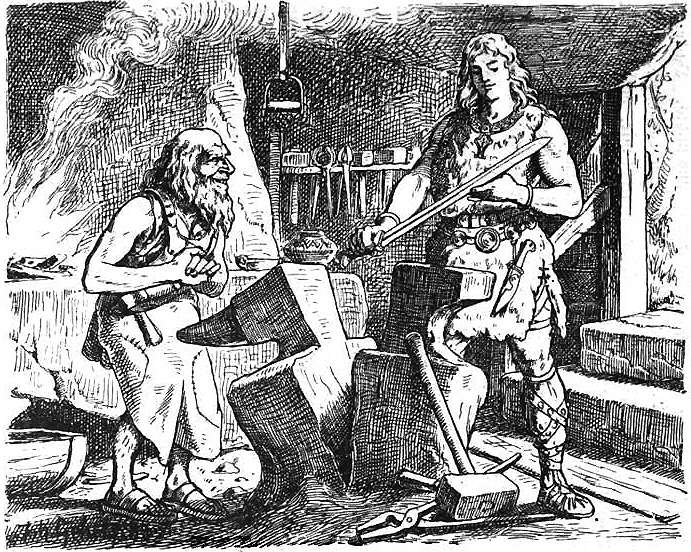
Sigurd proofs the sword Gram by Johannes Gehrts (1901)

Gram is primarily seen in the Volsunga Saga used by men in the Völsung line after Sigmund. Sigmund receives it during the wedding feast for his sister, Signy. Part of the way through the feast a strange man appears carrying a sword. Although unknown to Sigmund, this is the god Odin. He thrusts the sword into the Barnstokkr tree that grew in the middle of the hall and said, “The man to pull out this sword from the trunk shall receive it from me as a gift and he will find out for himself that he never bore in hand a better sword than this.” Soon after his departure, every man made his attempt to pull the sword out of the wood. All fail except Sigmund, who easily extracts it. The sword is a fine sword, and King Siggeir is covetous of it, offering Sigmund three times its weight in gold. When he refuses, King Siggeir grows angry and secretly begins plotting to steal it from Sigmund, eventually killing his father and capturing him and all of his brothers. After this, the sword disappears from the narrative until Signy secretly gives it back to Sigmund as he is buried alive with Sinfjotli. After Sigmund avenges his family, he uses the sword in several battles before it is eventually broken by Odin during Sigmund's final battle with King Lyngvi.

Hjördis, Sigmund's wife, takes up the two halves of the blade and keeps them for Sigurd, their son. The dwarven smith Regin later trains an adult Sigurd in metalworking. After a period of time, he tells Sigurd of the mighty dragon, Fafnir, and the treasure which it guards, asking Sigurd to slay it for him. Sigurd agrees on one condition: that Regin makes him a mighty sword capable of slaying such a monster.

Regin confidently makes Sigurd an admirable sword, but when Sigurd sees it, he is disappointed when it easily breaks with a single blow. On his second attempt, Regin makes him a sword superior to the last, but it also breaks. On his third attempt, Sigurd brings Regin the two halves of Gram, his father's sword, and when he strikes the anvil, it is cloven in two. Once he tested the strength of the sword, he left the workshop and went to a nearby stream to check its edge. Throwing a piece of wool upstream, he lets it press against Gram, causing it to be sliced through. After testing the blade's sharpness, he uses it to avenge his father, Sigmund, by slaying Lyngvi. Of the many feats done by Gram, by far the most well-known and important is the slaying of Fafnir the dragon. This deed is accomplished by Sigurd with a single, mighty thrust to the left shoulder where he drives the sword so deep, he gets his arms bloodied up to the shoulder. Eventually, Gram is used as a sign of chastity when it is placed between Sigurd and Brynhild on their funeral pyre after Brynhild arranged Sigurd's death before killing herself in turn. After this, the sword is no longer found in the manuscript.

== In Der Ring des Nibelungen ==
In Siegfried, the third of the four operas in the Ring des Nibelungen cycle, Mime, who essentially takes Regin's part, is unable to reforge Nothung (as Gram is called in the Ring). Siegfried, however, manages. Apart from this, the story of Regin and Sigurd is more or less identical to that of Mime and Siegfried.
