= Reginsmál =

Eddic poem

Reginn after he had been killed by Sigurd on the 11th century Ramsund carving in Södermanland, Sweden.

Reginsmál (Old Norse: 'The Lay of Reginn') is an Eddic poem interspersed with prose found in the Codex Regius manuscript. It is closely associated with Fáfnismál, the poem that immediately follows it in the Codex, and it is likely that the two of them were intended to be read together.

The poem, if regarded as a single unit, is disjoint and fragmentary, consisting of stanzas both in ljóðaháttr and fornyrðislag. The first part relates Loki's dealings with Andvari. Interpolated with prose passages, the poem moves on to Sigurd's relationship with Reginn and the advice given to him by Odin.
