= Andvaranaut =

Magic ring in Norse mythology

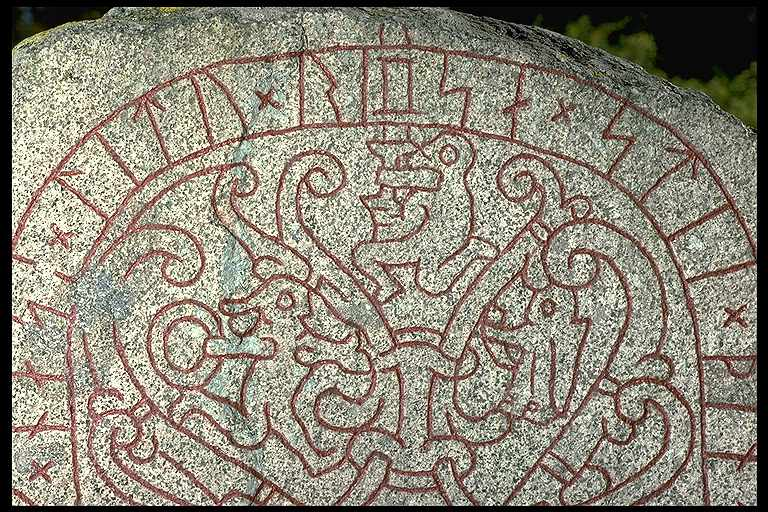
Andvaranaut to the left of the picture being held either by Andvari or Attila's messenger Vingi. On the top of the picture is Sigurd/Siegfried slaying Fafnir, and to the right is Sigrdrífa/Brunhild offering him a drinking horn. On the early 11th c. Drävle runestone.

In Norse mythology, Andvaranaut (12th c. Old Norse: [ˈɑndˌwɑrɑˌnɔut]), meaning Andvari's Gem ("Andvari's precious possession"), is a magic ring, initially owned by Andvari, that could help with finding sources of gold. Andvaranaut is mainly a cursed treasure, but according to scholars, it forms part of a bigger tradition of objects that are divinely and supernaturally empowered in Norse mythology. Such items held cultural and religious significance and often mediated relationships between gods, dwarves, and heroic figures.

The mischievous god Loki stole Andvari's treasure and the ring. In revenge, Andvari cursed the ring to bring misfortune and destruction to whoever possessed it. Loki quickly gave the cursed Andvaranaut to Hreidmar, King of the Dwarves, as reparation for having inadvertently killed Hreidmar's son, Ótr. Ótr's brother, Fafnir, then murdered Hreidmar and took the ring, turning into a dragon to guard it. Sigurd (Siegfried) later killed Fafnir and gave Andvaranaut to Brynhildr (Brünnehilde). Queen Grimhild of the Nibelungs then manipulated Sigurd and Brynhildr into marrying her children, bringing Andvaranaut's curse into her family.

== Literary references ==
Richard Wagner used Andvaranaut as inspiration for the title of his musical drama Der Ring des Nibelungen. J.R.R. Tolkien may have been inspired by Andvaranaut when designing the One Ring, both by making the One Ring cursed and by making one of its aspects to allow the wearer to find the other Rings of Power, knowing the location of the wearer of each of the Rings of Power, so that the wearer of the One Ring could control these Ringbearers. Modern scholarship emphasizes how Tolkien reimagines Andvaranaut in his poem cycle Sigurd & Guðrún by drawing upon, yet reworking, the incidents of the Völsunga saga. A comparative study demonstrates how the themes attendant on the ring were revised by Tolkien to correspond with contemporary literary interest while retaining key mythological components.

== See also ==
- Rings in early Germanic cultures
