= Völsung Cycle =

Series of Norse mythological legends

The Völsung Cycle is a series of legends in Norse mythology first extensively recorded in medieval Iceland, but which were also known in Sweden (as seen by carvings on numerous Sigurd stones), Norway, England and (perhaps) the Isle of Man. The original Icelandic tales were greatly expanded with native Scandinavian folklore, including that of Helgi Hundingsbane, which, in turn, originally appears to have been a separate tradition connected to the Ylfings.

Mythological material in this cycle includes some twenty Edda poems and the Völsunga saga. It covers much of the same subject matter as the Middle High German epic poem Nibelungenlied.

== Contemporary English influence ==
Material from the cycle was translated into English by such figures as Andrew Lang and Edward Thomas, and had a significant impact on the thought and writings of the Inklings.

== See also ==
- Beowulf
- Ermanaric
- Tyrfing Cycle
- Thidreks saga
- Völsung
