= Andvari =

Norse mythical character

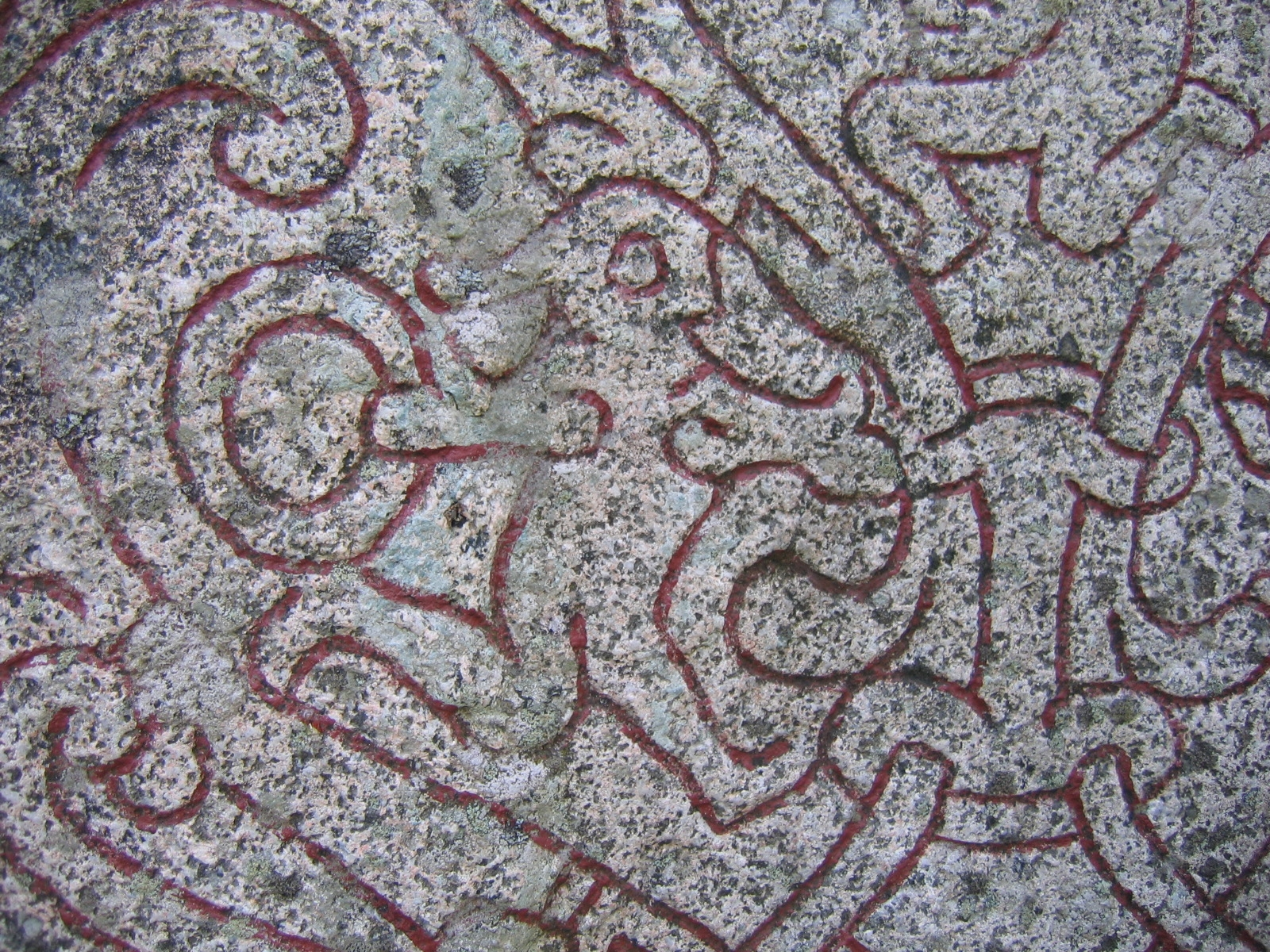
This part of the Drävle Runestone is held to depict Andvari.

In Norse mythology, Andvari (12th c. Old Norse: [ˈɑndˌwɑre]; "careful one") is a dwarf who lives underneath a waterfall and has the power to change himself into a pike (gedda) at will.

Andvari had a magical ring Andvaranaut, which helped him become wealthy. Using a net provided by Rán, Loki catches him as a pike and forces him to give up his gold and Andvaranaut. Andvari cursed the stolen gold which would destroy anyone who possessed it. After the deaths of Brynhild and Sigurd, Gunnar left Andvari's gold in a cave. Years later, Andvari discovered the cave and his lost gold, although his ring was lost forever.

In Richard Wagner's cycle of music dramas, Der Ring des Nibelungen, the character Alberich is a combination of Andvari and the character of Alberich from the Nibelungenlied.
