= Yujiang =

Yujiang may refer to:

- Yu River (China), in the south of China
- Yujiang County, in Yingtan, Jiangxi, China
- Yuqiang, Chinese mythological figure
