= Dragon =

Legendary creature

Dragons
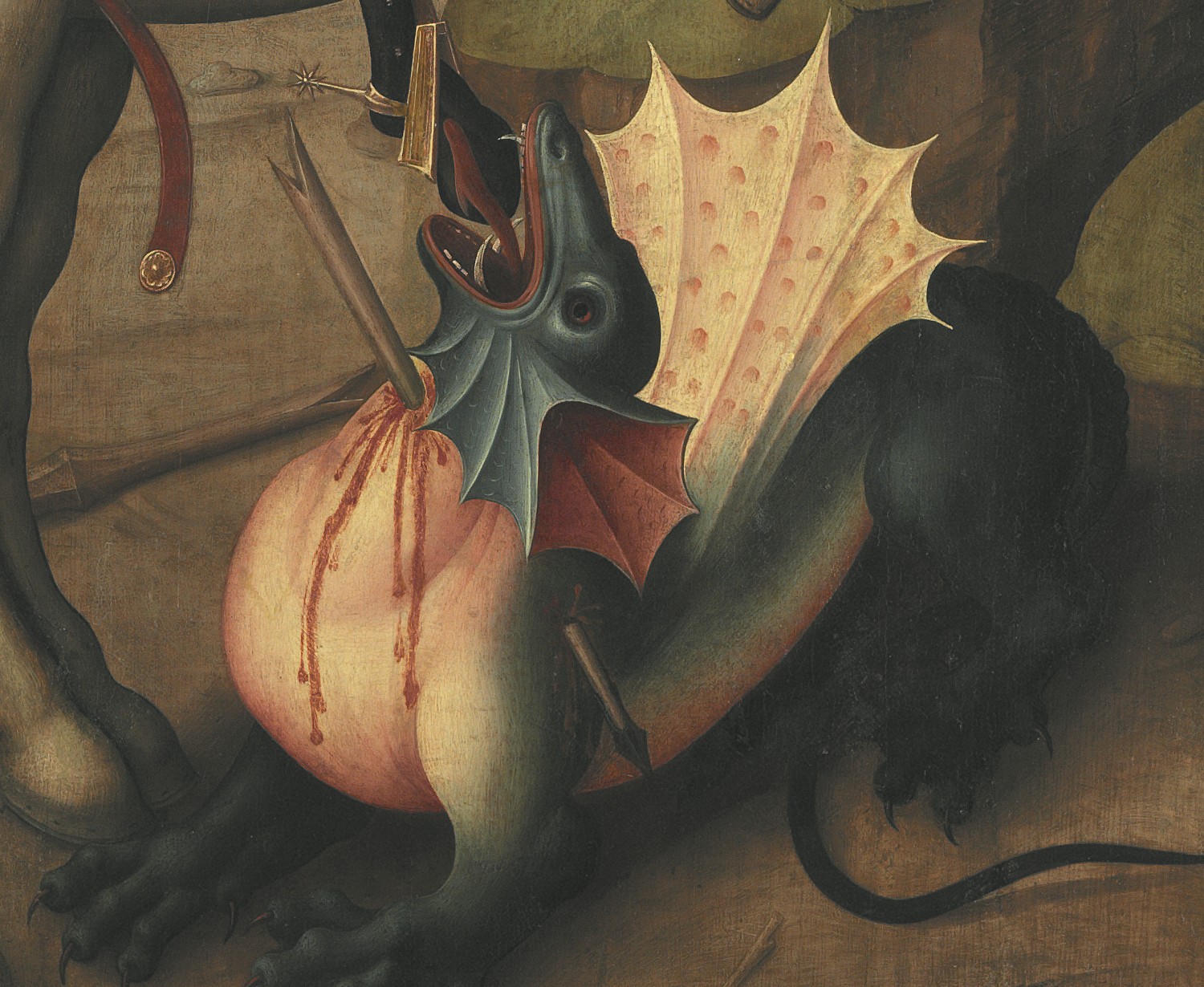
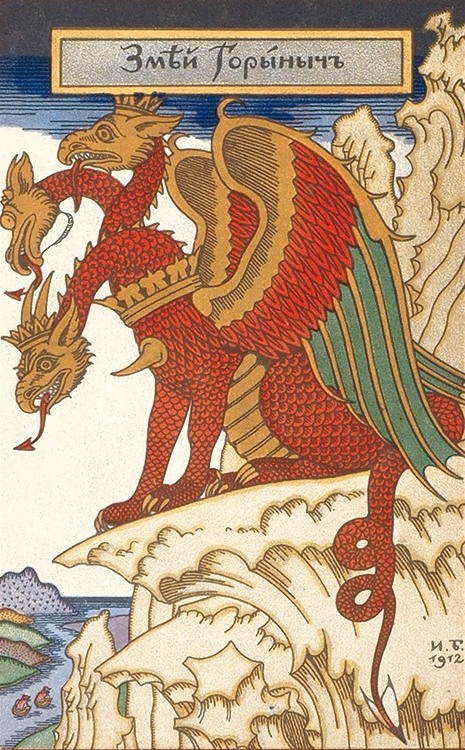
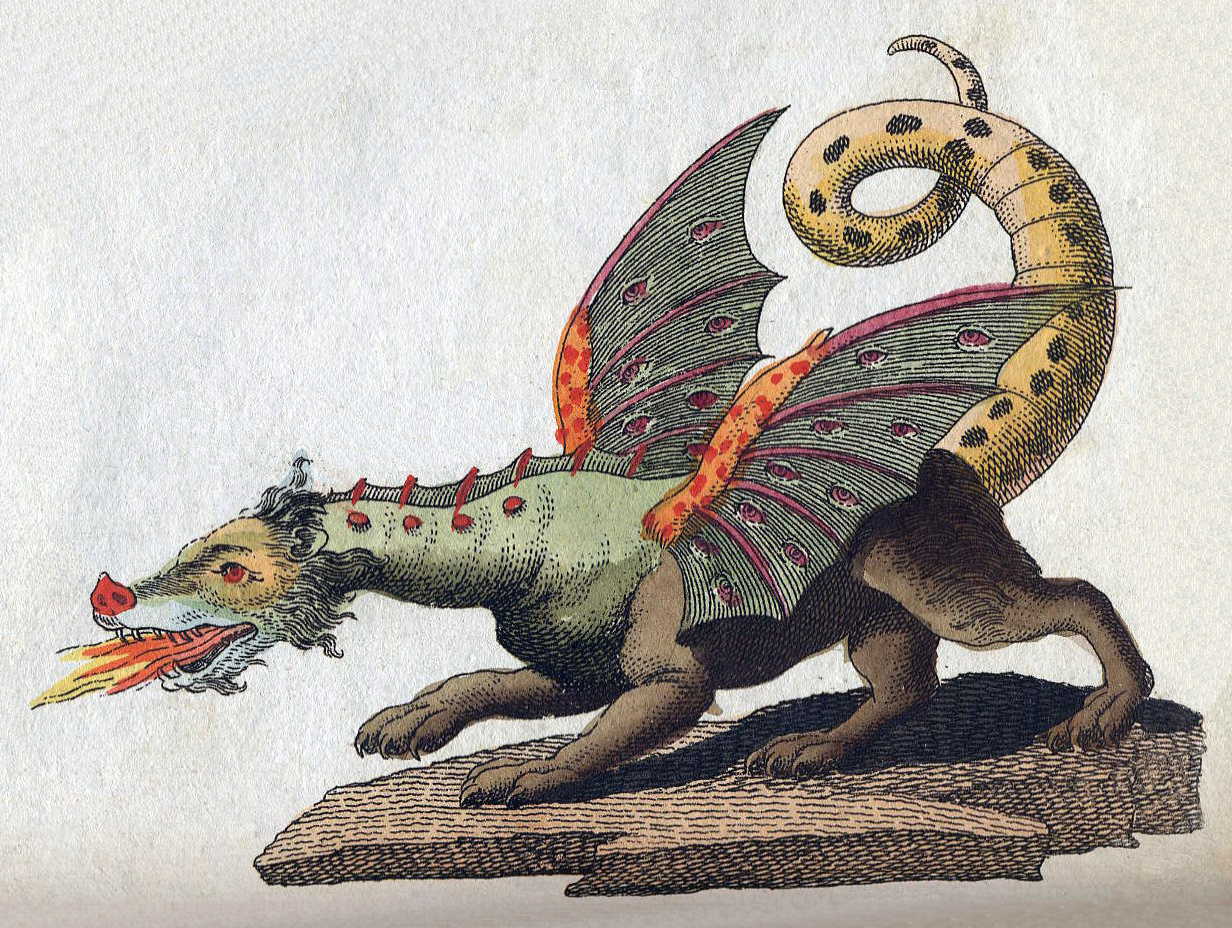
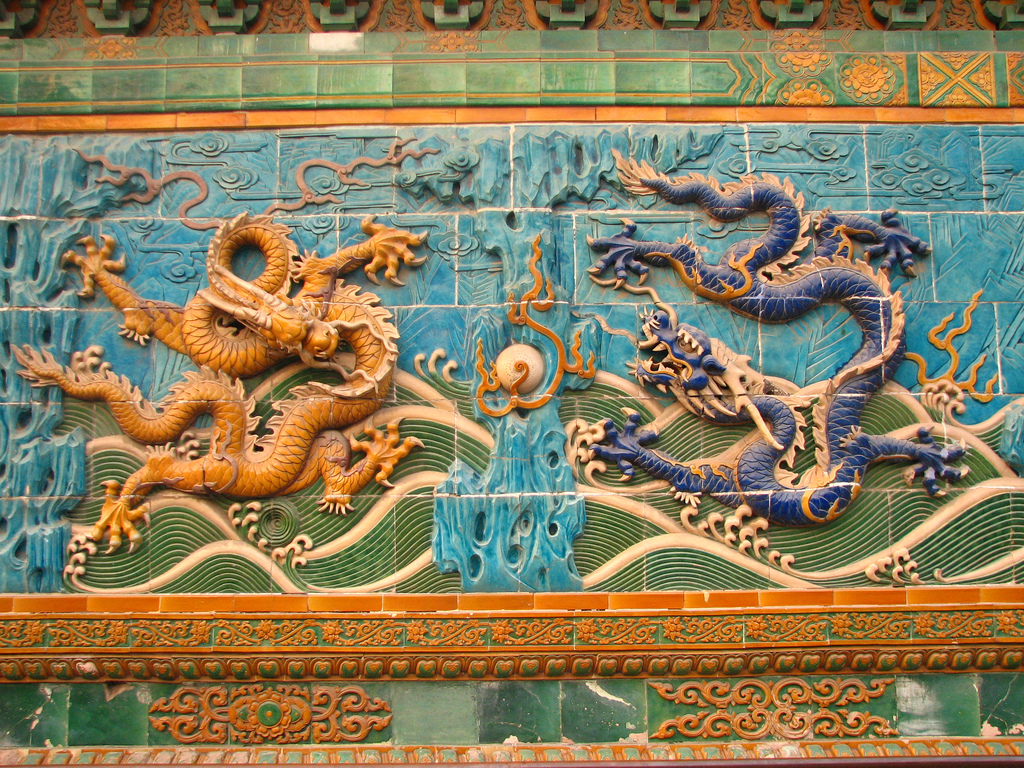
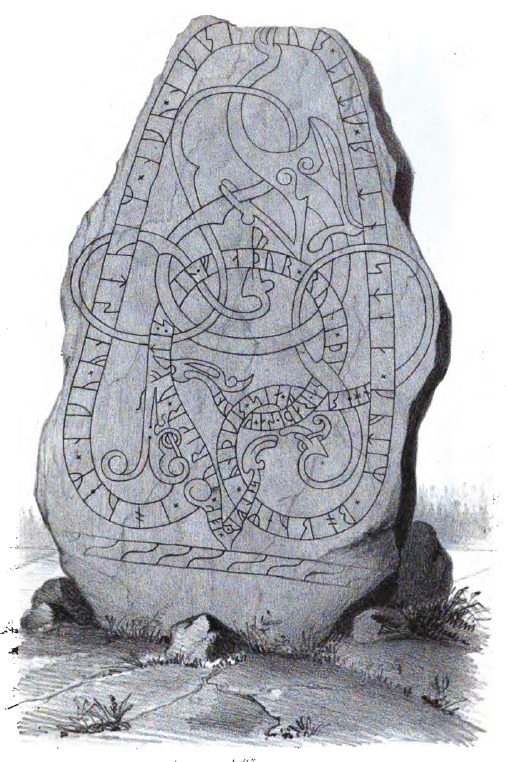
- Top left: The European dragon of the tale Saint George and the Dragon, by Jan Baegert
- Top right: The three-headed Slavic dragon Gorynich, which according to legend ate young girls and was a danger to humanity
- Middle left: Illustration of a winged, fire-breathing dragon by Friedrich Justin Bertuch from 1806
- Middle right: Qing-era carved imperial Chinese dragons at Nine-Dragon Wall, Beihai Park, Beijing
- Bottom left: Uppland Runic Inscription 887 (11th c.), featuring both a runic dragon and winged dragon, Sweden
- Bottom right: The Asian Azure Dragon (Qīnglóng) depicted in the Goguryeo tombs (37 BC–427 AD), South Korea

A dragon is a mythical creature found in the folklore of cultures throughout the world. It is roughly serpentine in form, and often possesses features drawn from different animals, such as wings and claws. In nearly all cultures, it is conceived of as a powerful and awe-inspiring creature.

Dragon-like creatures appear in ancient Mesopotamian art, where they could be hostile or benevolent. In East Asia, dragons were usually regarded as positive beings; Chinese dragons were thought to govern the rain, the sea, and other forms of water, and from the Han dynasty onwards they were emblems of imperial power. Ancient Greek drakontes were large serpents endowed with supernatural qualities; in myth they were defeated by heroes or gods, whereas in cult they were gentle figures associated with healing and wealth. In the Western tradition, dragons have been depicted as fire-breathing embodiments of evil, associated with death. Dragons have featured in works of modern fiction by writers such as J. R. R. Tolkien, Ursula K. Le Guin, and George R. R. Martin.

== Etymology ==
An early appearance of the Old English word dracan (oblique singular of draca) in Beowulf

The word dragon entered the English language in the early 13th century from Old French dragon, which, in turn, comes from Latin draco (genitive draconis), meaning "huge serpent, dragon", from Ancient Greek: δράκων, drákōn (genitive δράκοντος, drákontos) "serpent". The Greek and Latin term referred to any great serpent, not necessarily mythological. The Greek word δράκων is most likely derived from the Greek verb δέρκομαι (dérkomai) meaning "I see", the aorist form of which is ἔδρακον (édrakon). This is thought to have referred to something with a "deadly glance", or unusually bright or "sharp" eyes, or because a snake's eyes appear to be always open; each eye actually sees through a big transparent scale in its eyelids, which are permanently shut. The Greek word probably derives from an Indo-European base *derḱ- meaning "to see"; the Sanskrit root दृश् (dr̥ś-) also means "to see".

The Old English word draca or dræce (plural dracan) had similar meaning to the Middle English dragon or dragoun, but was derived from Latin draco through Old English's Germanic roots rather than through Old French. The Modern English word drake, another term for a mythological serpent or dragon, descends from draca/dræce. A more frequent synonym for the contemporary dragon in Old English was wyrm or wurm, referring to a reptile or a crawling or slithering creature.

== Theorised origins ==
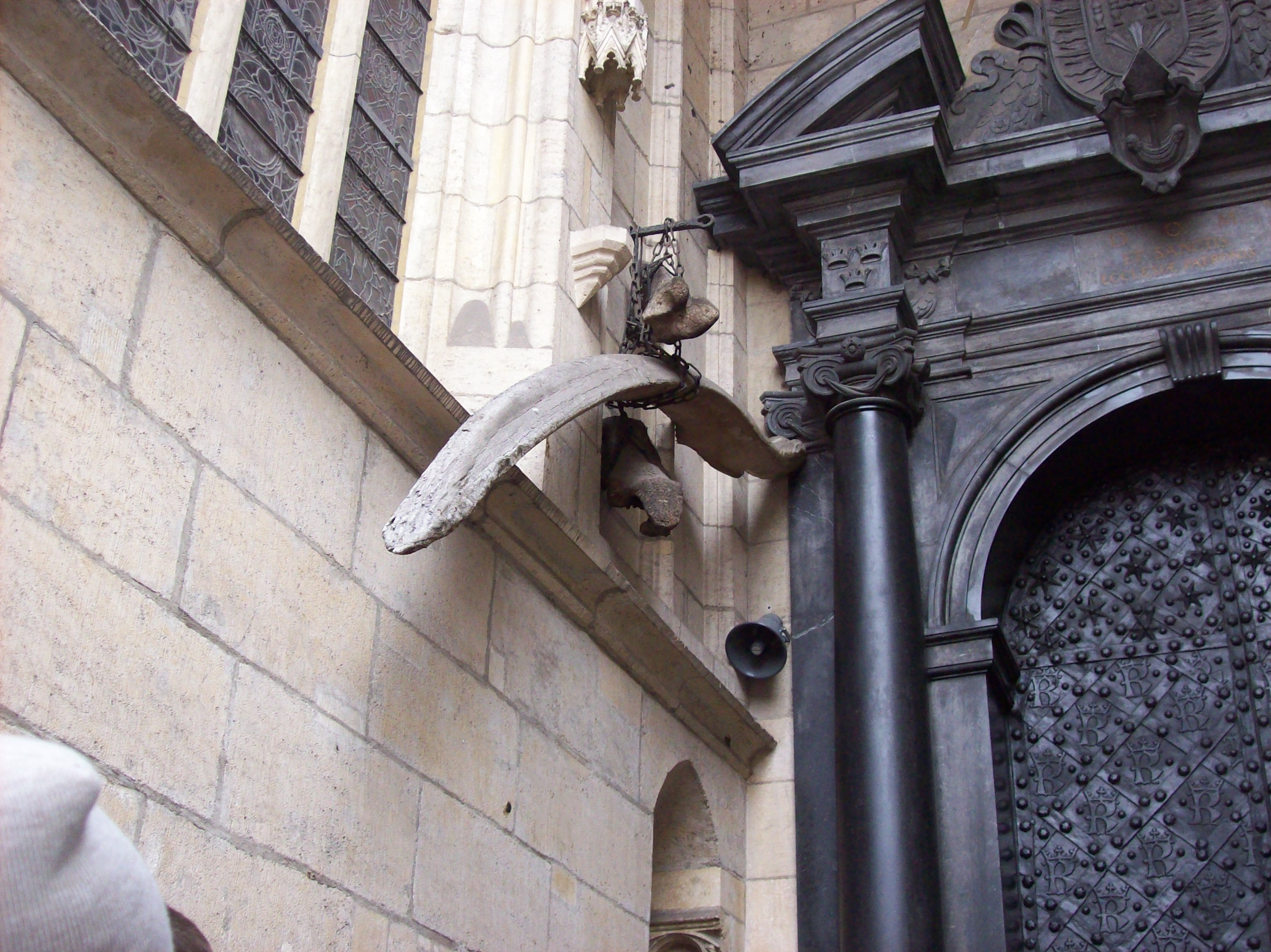
Several bones purported to belong to the Wawel Dragon hang outside Wawel Cathedral, but actually belong to a Pleistocene mammal.

Draconic creatures appear in virtually all cultures around the globe, and the earliest attested reports of draconic creatures resemble giant snakes. Draconic creatures are first described in the mythologies of the ancient Near East and appear in ancient Mesopotamian art and literature. Stories about storm gods slaying giant serpents occur throughout nearly all Near Eastern and Indo-European mythologies. Famous prototypical draconic creatures include the mušḫuššu of ancient Mesopotamia; Apep in Egyptian mythology; Vṛtra in the Rigveda; the Leviathan in the Hebrew Bible; Grand'Goule in the Poitou region in France; Python, Ladon, wyvern and the Lernaean Hydra in Greek mythology; Kulshedra in Albanian mythology; Unhcegila in Lakota mythology; Quetzalcoatl in Aztec culture; Jörmungandr, Níðhöggr, and Fafnir in Norse mythology; the dragon from Beowulf; and aži and az in ancient Persian mythology, closely related to another mythological figure, called Aži Dahaka or Zahhak. Nonetheless, scholars dispute where the idea of a dragon originates from, and a wide variety of hypotheses have been proposed.

In his book An Instinct for Dragons (2000), anthropologist David E. Jones suggests a hypothesis that humans, like monkeys, have inherited instinctive reactions to snakes, large cats, and birds of prey. He cites a study which found that approximately 39 people in a hundred are afraid of snakes and notes that fear of snakes is especially prominent in children, even in areas where snakes are rare. The earliest attested dragons all resemble snakes or have snakelike attributes. Jones therefore concludes that dragons appear in nearly all cultures because humans have an innate fear of snakes and other animals that were major predators of humans' primate ancestors. Dragons are usually said to reside in "dark caves, deep pools, wild mountain reaches, sea bottoms, haunted forests", all places which would have been fraught with danger for early human ancestors.

In her book The First Fossil Hunters: Dinosaurs, Mammoths, and Myth in Greek and Roman Times (2000), Adrienne Mayor argues that some stories of dragons may have been inspired by ancient discoveries of fossils belonging to dinosaurs and other prehistoric animals. She argues that the dragon lore of northern India may have been inspired by "observations of oversized, extraordinary bones in the fossilbeds of the Siwalik Hills below the Himalayas" and that ancient Greek artistic depictions of the Monster of Troy may have been influenced by fossils of Samotherium, an extinct species of giraffe whose fossils are common in the Mediterranean region. In China, a region where fossils of large prehistoric animals are common, these remains are frequently identified as "dragon bones" and are commonly used in traditional Chinese medicine. Mayor, however, is careful to point out that not all stories of dragons and giants are inspired by fossils and notes that Scandinavia has many stories of dragons and sea monsters, but has long "been considered barren of large fossils." In one of her later books, she states that, "Many dragon images around the world were based on folk knowledge or exaggerations of living reptiles, such as Komodo dragons, Gila monsters, iguanas, alligators, or, in California, alligator lizards, though this still fails to account for the Scandinavian legends, as no such animals (historical or otherwise) have ever been found in this region."

Robert Blust in The Origin of Dragons (2000) argues that, like many other creations of traditional cultures, dragons are largely explicable as products of a convergence of rational pre-scientific speculation about the world of real events. In this case, the event is the natural mechanism governing rainfall and drought, with particular attention paid to the phenomenon of the rainbow.

== Africa ==
=== Egypt ===
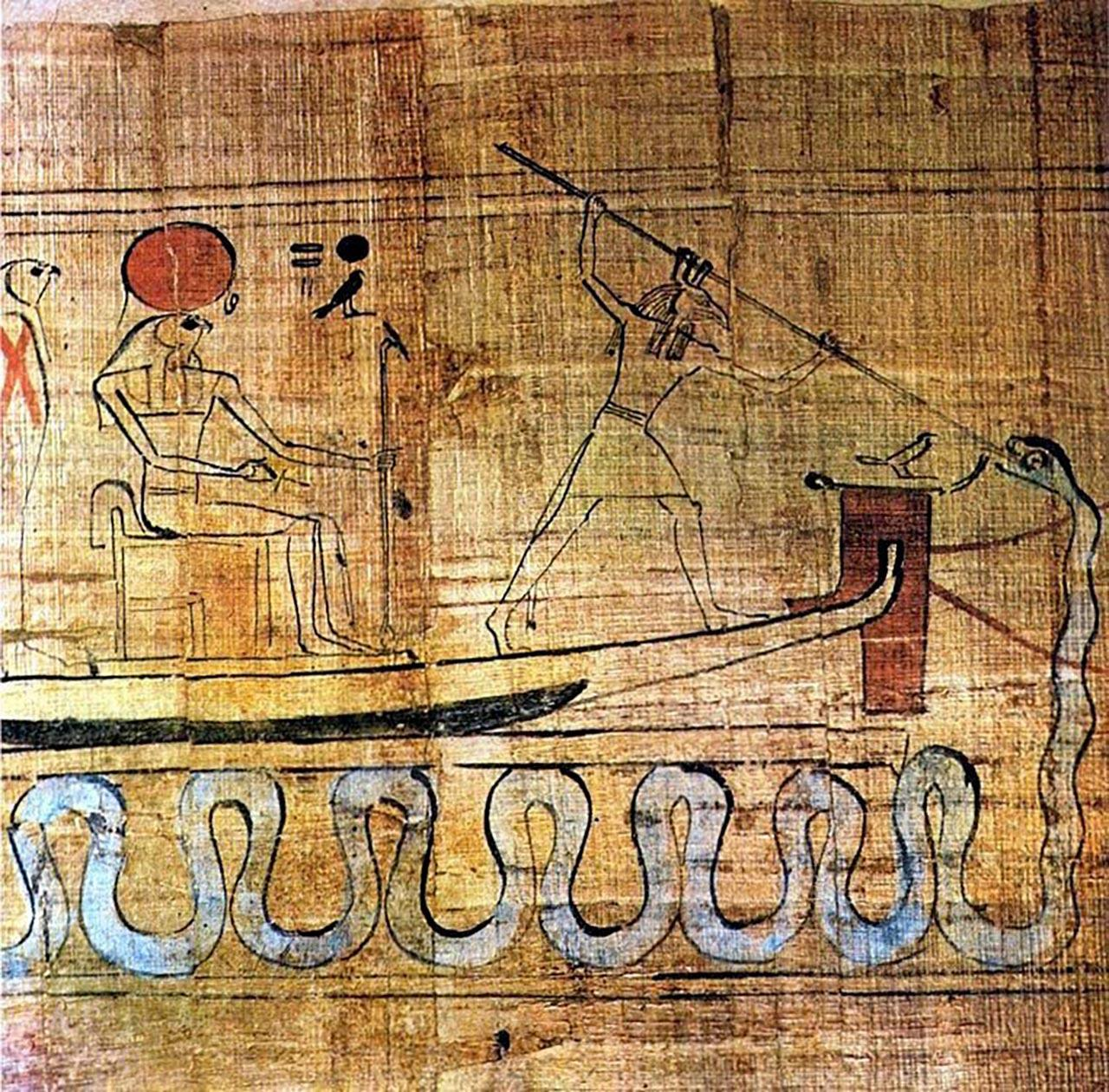
Illustration from an ancient Egyptian papyrus manuscript showing the god Set spearing the serpent Apep as he attacks the sun boat of Ra

In Egyptian mythology, Apep or Apophis is a giant serpentine creature who resides in the Duat, the Egyptian underworld. The Bremner-Rhind papyrus, written around 310 BC, preserves an account of a much older Egyptian tradition that the setting of the sun is caused by Ra descending to the Duat to battle Apep. In some accounts, Apep is as long as the height of eight men with a head made of flint. Thunderstorms and earthquakes were thought to be caused by Apep's roar and solar eclipses were thought to be the result of Apep attacking Ra during the daytime. In some myths, Apep is slain by the god Set. Nehebkau is another giant serpent who guards the Duat and aided Ra in his battle against Apep. Nehebkau was so massive in some stories that the entire earth was believed to rest atop his coils. Denwen is a giant serpent mentioned in the Pyramid Texts whose body was made of fire and who ignited a conflagration that nearly destroyed all the gods of the Egyptian pantheon. He was ultimately defeated by the Pharaoh, a victory which affirmed the Pharaoh's divine right to rule.

The ouroboros was a well-known Egyptian symbol of a serpent swallowing its own tail. The precursor to the ouroboros was the "Many-Faced", a serpent with five heads, who, according to the Amduat, the oldest surviving Book of the Afterlife, was said to coil around the corpse of the sun god Ra protectively. The earliest surviving depiction of a "true" ouroboros comes from the gilded shrines in the tomb of Tutankhamun. In the early centuries AD, the ouroboros was adopted as a symbol by Gnostic Christians and chapter 136 of the Pistis Sophia, an early Gnostic text, describes "a great dragon whose tail is in its mouth". In medieval alchemy, the ouroboros became a typical western dragon with wings, legs, and a tail. A famous image of the dragon gnawing on its tail from the eleventh-century Codex Marcianus was copied in numerous works on alchemy.

=== Ethiopia ===
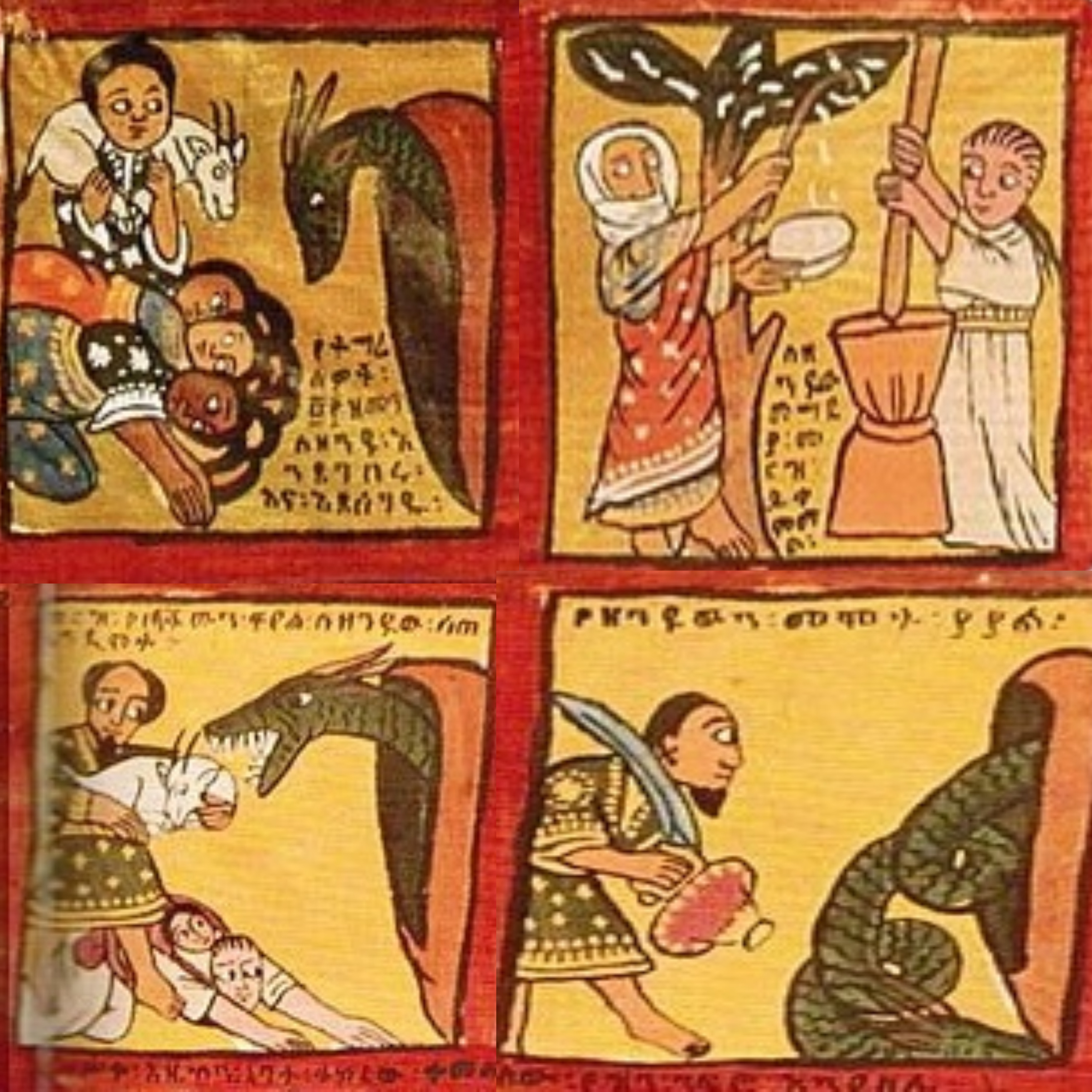
Four panels illustrating the Arwe account from a larger painting by an anonymous Ethiopian painter, 17th-19th c.: 1. Arwe demanding sacrifice; 2. Poison is extracted from the tree; 3. Arwe is offered a white goat; 4. Arwe dies.

In Ethiopian mythology, Arwe (Ge’ez: አርዌ), also known as Wainaba, is a serpent-king who ruled for four hundred years before being destroyed by the founder of the Solomonic dynasty. His story comes in a number of versions, all of which have him as a tyrannical ruler who demands sacrifice. The myth is part of a wider tradition of serpent- or dragon-kings, such as the Babylonian dragon.

== West Asia ==
=== Mesopotamia ===
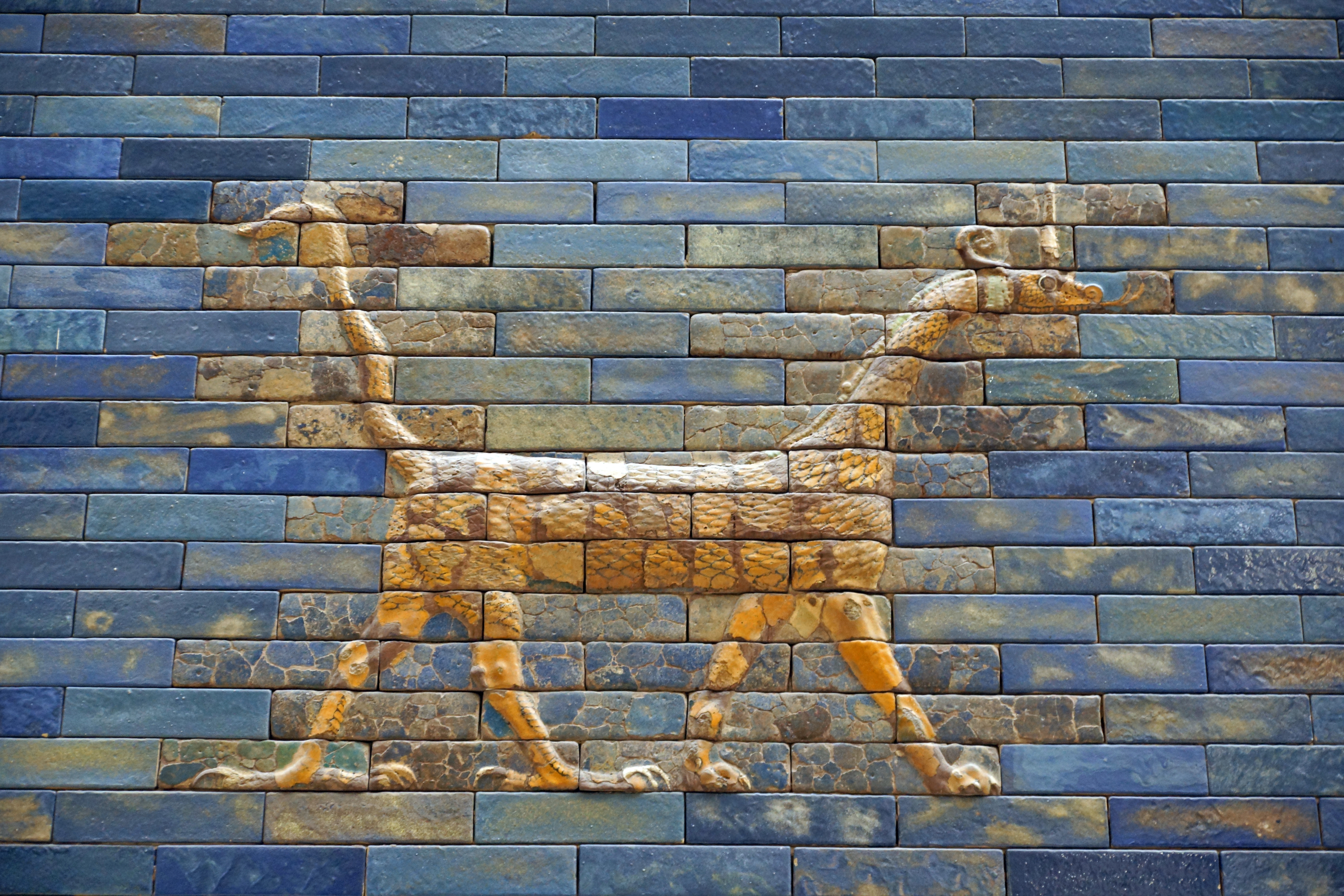
The mušḫuššu is a serpentine, draconic monster from ancient Mesopotamian mythology with the body and neck of a snake, the forelegs of a lion, and the hind-legs of a bird. Here it is shown as it appears in the Ishtar Gate from the city of Babylon.

References to dragons of both benevolent and malevolent characters occur throughout ancient Mesopotamian literature. In Sumerian poetry, great kings are often compared to the ušumgal, a gigantic, serpentine monster. A draconic creature with the foreparts of a lion and the hind-legs, tail, and wings of a bird appears in Mesopotamian artwork from the Akkadian Period (c. 2334 – 2154 BC) until the Neo-Babylonian Period (626 BC–539 BC). The dragon is usually shown with its mouth open. It may have been known as the (ūmu) nā'iru, which means "roaring weather beast", and may have been associated with the god Ishkur (Hadad). A slightly different lion-dragon with two horns and the tail of a scorpion appears in art from the Neo-Assyrian Period (911 BC–609 BC). A relief probably commissioned by Sennacherib shows the gods Ashur, Sin, and Adad standing on its back.

Another draconic creature with horns, the body and neck of a snake, the forelegs of a lion, and the hind-legs of a bird appears in Mesopotamian art from the Akkadian Period until the Hellenistic Period (323 BC–31 BC). This creature, known in Akkadian as the mušḫuššu, meaning "furious serpent", was used as a symbol for particular deities and also as a general protective emblem. It seems to have originally been the attendant of the Underworld god Ninazu, but later became the attendant to the Hurrian storm-god Tishpak, as well as, later, Ninazu's son Ningishzida, the Babylonian national god Marduk, the scribal god Nabu, and the Assyrian national god Ashur.

Scholars disagree regarding the appearance of Tiamat, the Babylonian goddess personifying primeval chaos, slain by Marduk in the Babylonian creation epic Enûma Eliš. She was traditionally regarded by scholars as having had the form of a giant serpent, but several scholars have pointed out that this shape "cannot be imputed to Tiamat with certainty" and she seems to have at least sometimes been regarded as anthropomorphic. Nonetheless, in some texts, she seems to be described with horns, a tail, and a hide that no weapon can penetrate, all features which suggest she was conceived as some form of dragoness.

=== Levant ===
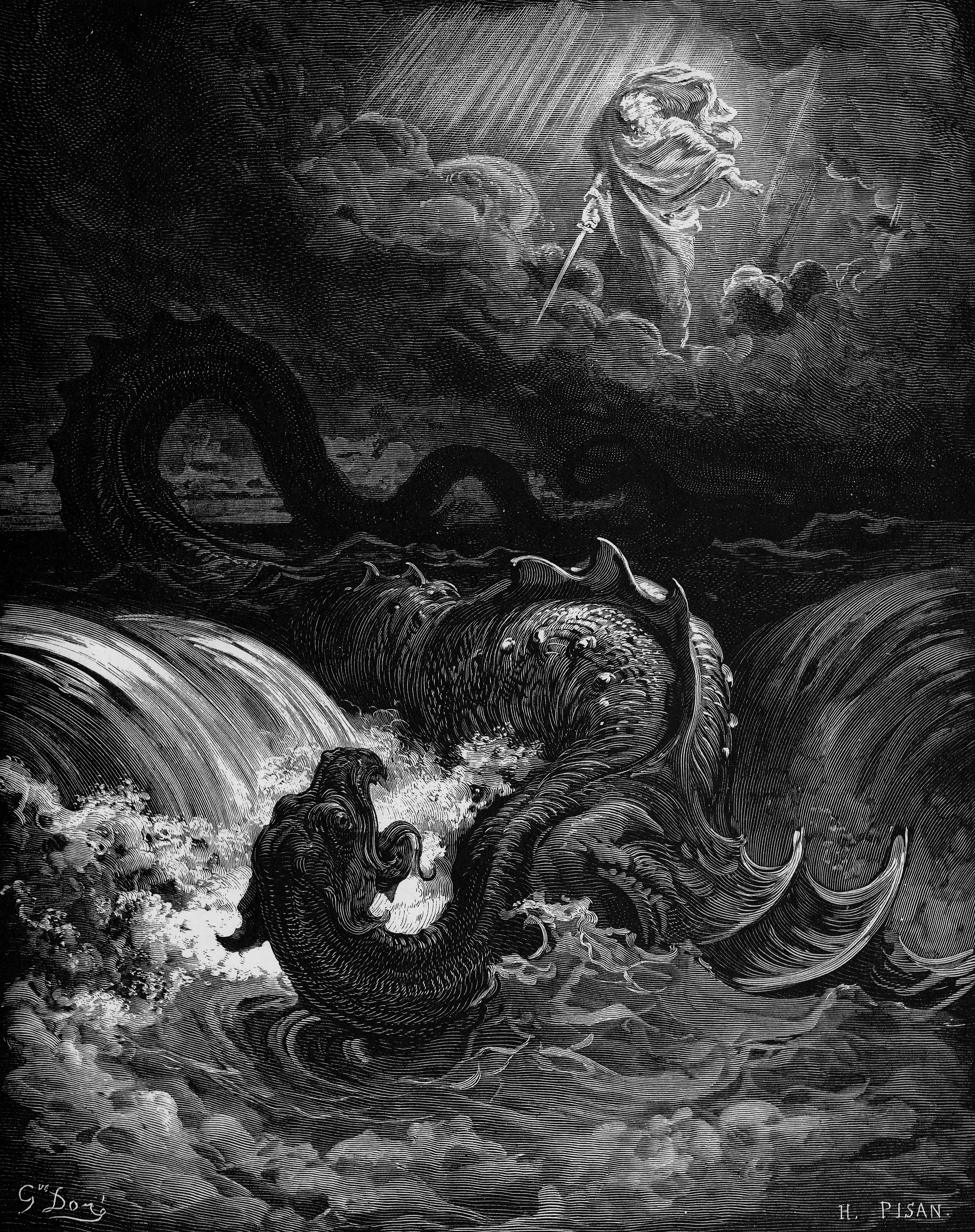
The Destruction of Leviathan (1865) by Gustave Doré

In the mythologies of the Ugarit region, specifically the Baal Cycle from the Ugaritic texts, the sea-dragon Lōtanu is described as "the twisting serpent / the powerful one with seven heads." In KTU 1.5 I 2–3, Lōtanu is slain by the storm-god Baal, but, in KTU 1.3 III 41–42, he is instead slain by the virgin warrior goddess Anat.

In the Hebrew Bible, in Psalm 74, the sea-dragon Leviathan, is slain by Yahweh, god of the kingdoms of Israel and Judah, as part of the creation of the world. Isaiah describes Leviathan as a tanin (תנין), which is translated as "sea monster", "serpent", or "dragon". In Isaiah 27:1, Yahweh's destruction of Leviathan is foretold as part of his impending overhaul of the universal order.

Job 41:1–34 contains a detailed description of Leviathan, who is described as being so powerful that only Yahweh can overcome it. Job 41:19–21 states that Leviathan exhales fire and smoke, making its identification as a mythical dragon clearly apparent. In some parts of the Old Testament, Leviathan is historicized as a symbol for the nations that stand against Yahweh. Rahab, a synonym for "Leviathan", is used in several Biblical passages in reference to Egypt. Isaiah 30:7 declares: "For Egypt's help is worthless and empty, therefore I have called her 'the silenced Rahab'." Similarly, Psalm 87:3 reads: "I reckon Rahab and Babylon as those that know me..." In Ezekiel 29:3–5 and Ezekiel 32:2–8, the pharaoh of Egypt is described as a "dragon" (tannîn). In the deuterocanonical story of Bel and the Dragon from the Book of Daniel, the prophet Daniel sees a dragon being worshipped by the Babylonians. Daniel makes "cakes of pitch, fat, and hair"; the dragon eats them and bursts open.

=== Iran ===
Azhi Dahaka (Avestan Great Snake) is a dragon or demonic figure in the texts and mythology of Zoroastrian Persia, where he is one of the subordinates of Angra Mainyu. Alternate names include Azi Dahak, Dahaka, and Dahak. Aži (nominative ažiš) is the Avestan word for "serpent" or "dragon. The Avestan term Aži Dahāka and the Middle Persian azdahāg are the sources of the Middle Persian Manichaean demon of greed "Az", Old Armenian mythological figure Azhdahak, Modern Persian 'aždehâ/aždahâ', Tajik Persian 'azhdahâ', Urdu 'azhdahā' (اژدها). The name also migrated to Eastern Europe, assumed the form "azhdaja" and the meaning "dragon", "dragoness" or "water snake" in the Balkanic and Slavic languages.

Despite the negative aspect of Aži Dahāka in mythology, dragons have been used on some banners of war throughout the history of Iranian peoples.

The Azhdarchid group of pterosaurs are named from a Persian word for "dragon" that ultimately comes from Aži Dahāka.

In Persian Sufi literature, Rumi writes in his Masnavi that the dragon symbolizes the sensual soul (nafs), greed and lust, that need to be mortified in a spiritual battle.

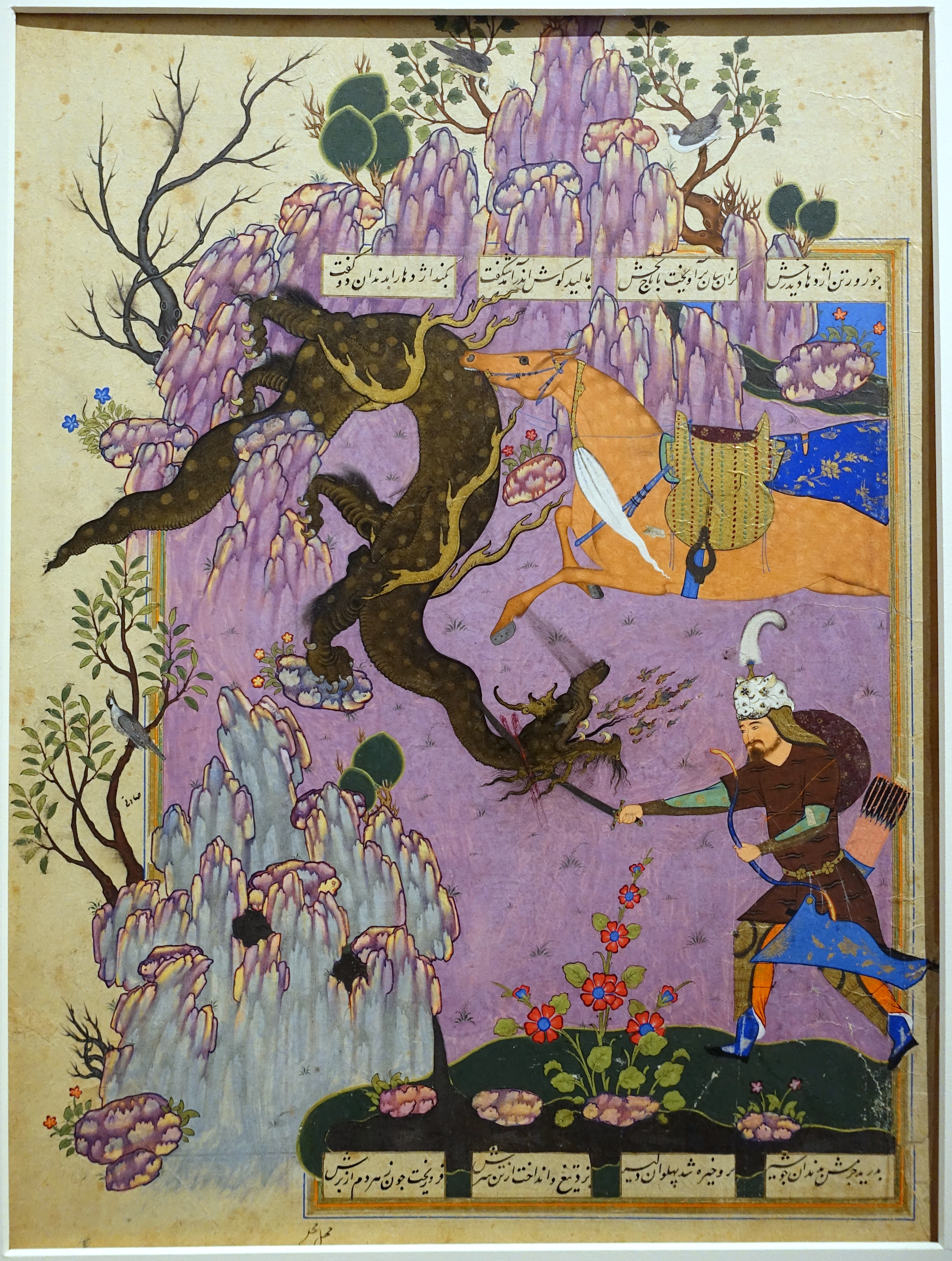
Rustam kills the dragon, folio from Shahnameh of Shah Ismail II, attrib. Sadegi (Beg), Iran, Tabriz, c. 1576 AD, view 1 – Aga Khan Museum – Toronto, Canada

In Ferdowsi's Shahnameh, the Iranian hero Rostam must slay an 80-meter-long dragon (which renders itself invisible to human sight) with the aid of his legendary horse, Rakhsh. As Rostam is sleeping, the dragon approaches; Rakhsh attempts to wake Rostam, but fails to alert him to the danger until Rostam sees the dragon. Rakhsh bites the dragon, while Rostam decapitates it. This is the third trial of Rostam's Seven Labors.

Rostam is also credited with the slaughter of other dragons in the Shahnameh and in other Iranian oral traditions, notably in the myth of Babr-e-Bayan. In this tale, Rostam is still an adolescent and kills a dragon in the "Orient" (either India or China, depending on the source) by forcing it to swallow either ox hides filled with quicklime and stones or poisoned blades. The dragon swallows these foreign objects and its stomach bursts, after which Rostam flays the dragon and fashions a coat from its hide called the babr-e bayān. In some variants of the story, Rostam then remains unconscious for two days and nights, but is guarded by his steed Rakhsh. On reviving, he washes himself in a spring. In the Mandean tradition of the story, Rostam hides in a box, is swallowed by the dragon, and kills it from inside its belly. The king of China then gives Rostam his daughter in marriage as a reward.

== East Asia ==
=== China ===
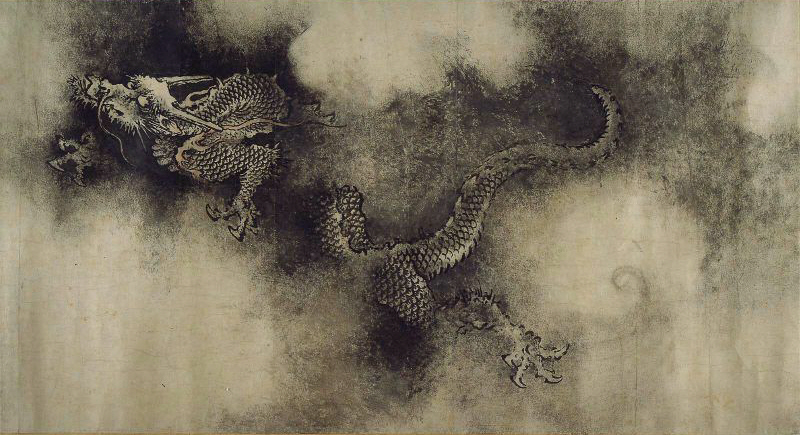
A dragon from the Nine Dragons Scroll by Chen Rong, 1244 AD.

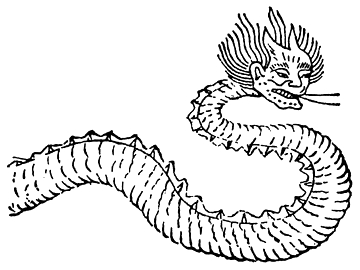
Illustration of the dragon Zhulong from a seventeenth-century edition of the Shanhaijing

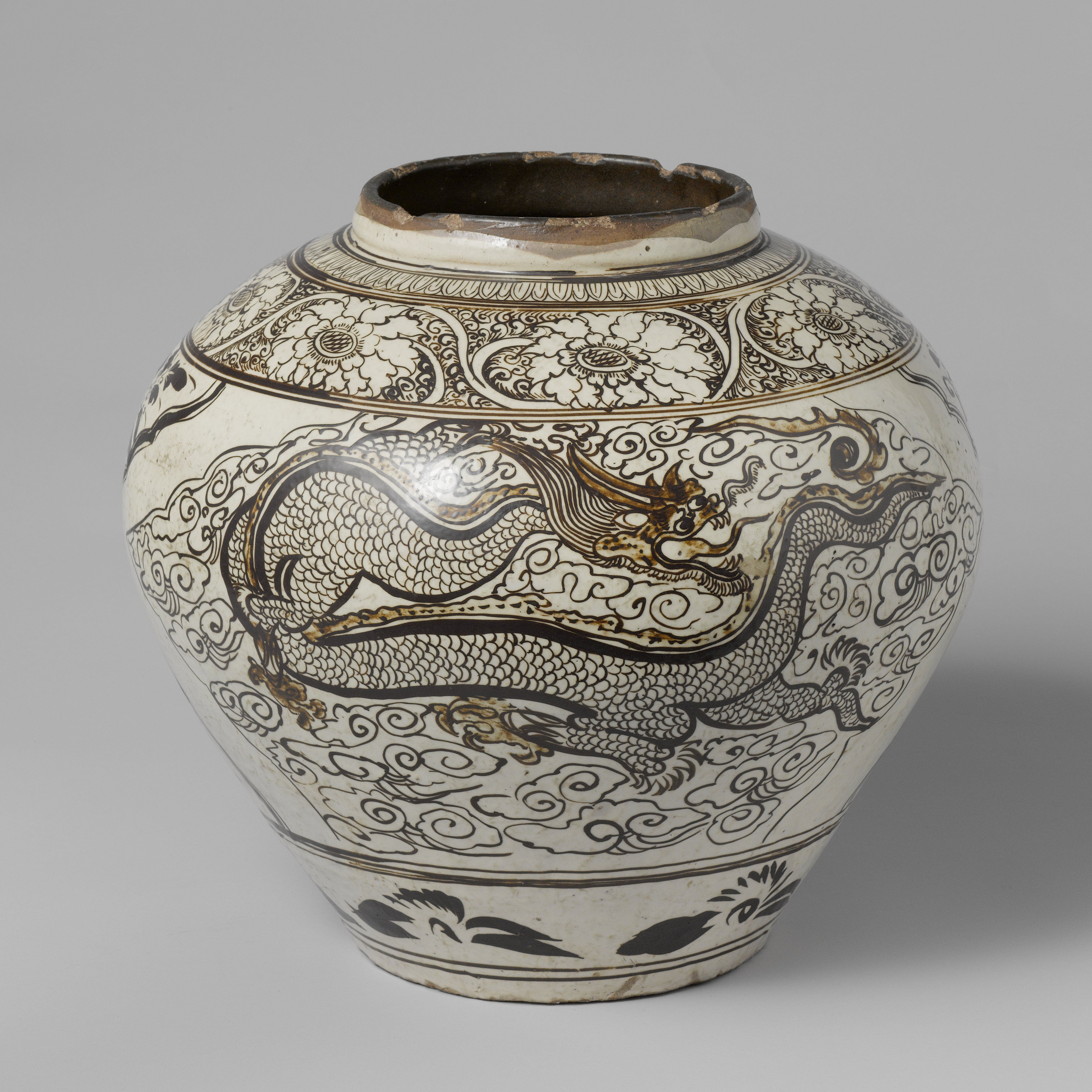
Dragon art on a vase, Yuan dynasty

The word "dragon" has come to be applied to the legendary creature in Chinese mythology, loong (traditional 龍, simplified 龙, Japanese simplified 竜, Pinyin lóng), which is associated with good fortune, and many East Asian deities and demigods have dragons as their personal mounts or companions. Dragons were also identified with the Emperor of China, who, during later Chinese imperial history, was the only one permitted to have dragons on his house, clothing, or personal articles. Archaeologist Zhōu Chong-Fa believes that the Chinese word for dragon is an onomatopoeia of the sound of thunder or lùhng in Cantonese.

The Chinese dragon (simplified Chinese: 龙; traditional Chinese: 龍; pinyin: lóng) is the highest-ranking creature in the Chinese animal hierarchy. Its origins are vague, but its "ancestors can be found on Neolithic pottery as well as Bronze Age ritual vessels." A number of popular stories deal with the rearing of dragons. The Zuo zhuan, which was probably written during the Warring States period, describes a man named Dongfu, a descendant of Yangshu'an, who loved dragons and, because he could understand a dragon's will, he was able to tame them and raise them well. He served Emperor Shun, who gave him the family name Huanlong, meaning "dragon-raiser". In another story, Kong Jia, the fourteenth emperor of the Xia dynasty, was given a male and a female dragon as a reward for his obedience to the god of heaven, but could not train them, so he hired a dragon-trainer named Liulei, who had learned how to train dragons from Huanlong. One day, the female dragon died unexpectedly, so Liulei secretly chopped her up, cooked her meat, and served it to the king, who loved it so much that he demanded Liulei to serve him the same meal again. Since Liulei had no means of procuring more dragon meat, he fled the palace.

One of the most famous dragon stories is about the Lord Ye Gao, who loved dragons obsessively, even though he had never seen one. He decorated his whole house with dragon motifs and, seeing this display of admiration, a real dragon came and visited Ye Gao, but the lord was so terrified at the sight of the creature that he ran away. In Chinese legend, the culture hero Fu Hsi is said to have been crossing the Lo River, when he saw the lung ma, a Chinese horse-dragon with seven dots on its face, six on its back, eight on its left flank, and nine on its right flank. He was so moved by this apparition that, when he arrived home, he drew a picture of it, including the dots. He later used these dots as letters and invented Chinese writing, which he used to write his book I Ching. In another Chinese legend, the physician Ma Shih Huang is said to have healed a sick dragon. Another legend reports that a man once came to the healer Lo Chên-jen, telling him that he was a dragon and that he needed to be healed. After Lo Chên-jen healed the man, a dragon appeared to him and carried him to heaven.

In the Shanhaijing, a classic mythography probably compiled mostly during the Han dynasty, various deities and demigods are associated with dragons. One of the most famous Chinese dragons is Ying Long ("responding dragon"), who helped the Huangdi, the Yellow Emperor, defeat the tyrant Chiyou. The dragon Zhulong ("torch dragon") is a god "who composed the universe with his body." In the Shanhaijing, many mythic heroes are said to have been conceived after their mothers copulated with divine dragons, including Huangdi, Shennong, Emperor Yao, and Emperor Shun. The god Zhurong and the emperor Qi are both described as being carried by two dragons, as are Huangdi, Zhuanxu, Yuqiang, and Roshou in various other texts. According to the Huainanzi, an evil black dragon once caused a destructive deluge, which was ended by the mother goddess Nüwa by slaying the dragon.

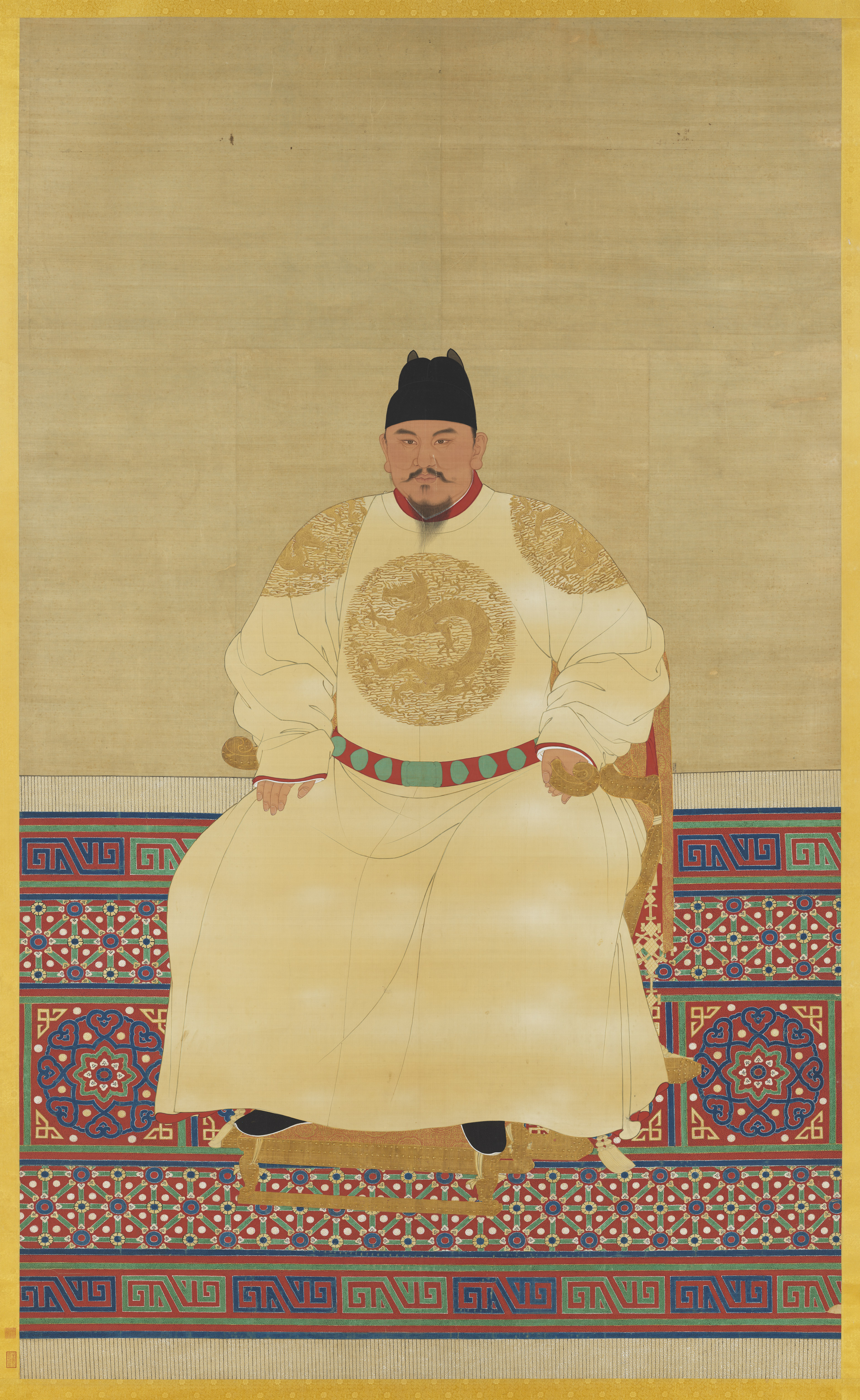
Hongwu Emperor with dragon emblem on his chest. c. 1377

A large number of ethnic myths about dragons are told throughout China. The Houhanshu, compiled in the fifth century BC by Fan Ye, reports a story belonging to the Ailaoyi people, which holds that a woman named Shayi who lived in the region around Mount Lao became pregnant with ten sons after being touched by a tree trunk floating in the water while fishing. She gave birth to the sons and the tree trunk turned into a dragon, who asked to see his sons. The woman showed them to him, but all of them ran away except for the youngest, who the dragon licked on the back and named Jiu Long, meaning "sitting back". The sons later elected him king and the descendants of the ten sons became the Ailaoyi people, who tattooed dragons on their backs in honor of their ancestor. The Miao people of southwest China have a story that a divine dragon created the first humans by breathing on monkeys that came to play in his cave. The Han people have many stories about Short-Tailed Old Li, a black dragon who was born to a poor family in Shandong. When his mother saw him for the first time, she fainted and, when his father came home from the field and saw him, he hit him with a spade and cut off part of his tail. Li burst through the ceiling and flew away to the Black Dragon River in northeast China, where he became the god of that river. On the anniversary of his mother's death on the Chinese lunar calendar, Old Li returns home, causing it to rain. He is still worshipped as a rain god.

Diagram representing the Four Dragon Kings of the Four Seas in relation to the central Dragon King of the Earth

In China, a dragon is thought to have power over rain. Dragons and their associations with rain are the source of the Chinese customs of dragon dancing and dragon boat racing. Dragons are closely associated with rain and drought is thought to be caused by a dragon's laziness. Prayers invoking dragons to bring rain are common in Chinese texts. The Luxuriant Dew of the Spring and Autumn Annals, attributed to the Han dynasty scholar Dong Zhongshu, prescribes making clay figurines of dragons during a time of drought and having young men and boys pace and dance among the figurines in order to encourage the dragons to bring rain. Texts from the Qing dynasty advise hurling the bone of a tiger or dirty objects into the pool where the dragon lives; since dragons cannot stand tigers or dirt, the dragon of the pool will cause heavy rain to drive the object out. Rainmaking rituals invoking dragons are still very common in many Chinese villages, where each village has its own god said to bring rain and many of these gods are dragons. The Chinese dragon kings are thought of as the inspiration for the Hindu myth of the naga. According to these stories, every body of water is ruled by a dragon king, each with a different power, rank, and ability, so people began establishing temples across the countryside dedicated to these figures.

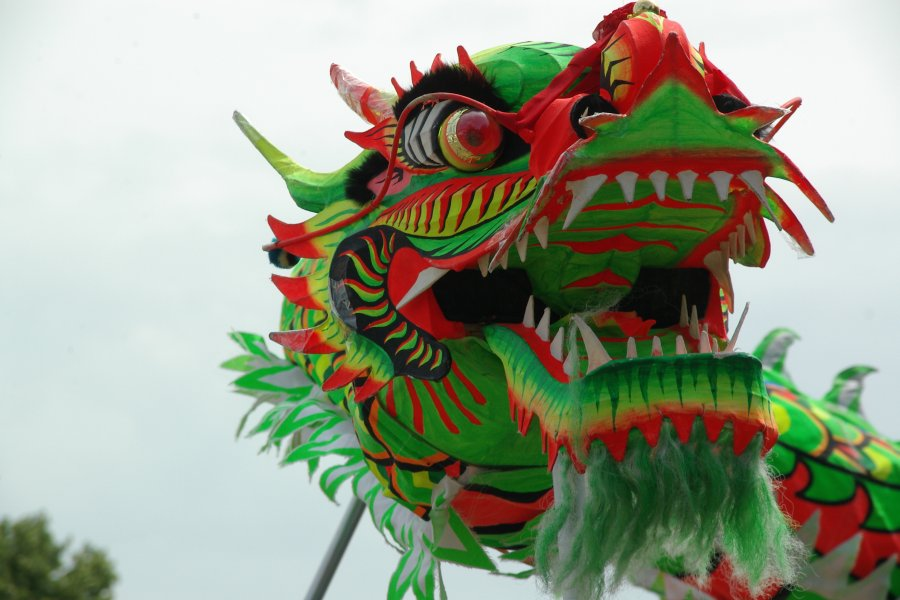
Head of a dragon from a Chinese dragon dance performed in Helsinki in the year 2000.

Many traditional Chinese customs revolve around dragons. During various holidays, including the Spring Festival and Lantern Festival, villagers will construct an approximately sixteen-foot-long dragon from grass, cloth, bamboo strips, and paper, which they will parade through the city as part of a dragon dance. The original purpose of this ritual was to bring good weather and a strong harvest, but now it is done mostly only for entertainment. During the Duanwu festival, several villages, or even a whole province, will hold a dragon boat race, in which people race across a body of water in boats carved to look like dragons, while a large audience watches on the banks. The custom is traditionally said to have originated after the poet Qu Yuan committed suicide by drowning himself in the Miluo River and people raced out in boats hoping to save him. But most historians agree that the custom actually originated much earlier as a ritual to avert ill fortune. Starting during the Han dynasty and continuing until the Qing dynasty, the Chinese emperor gradually became closely identified with dragons, and emperors themselves claimed to be the incarnations of a divine dragon. Eventually, dragons were only allowed to appear on clothing, houses, and articles of everyday use belonging to the emperor and any commoner who possessed everyday items bearing the image of the dragon was ordered to be executed. After the last Chinese emperor was overthrown in 1911, this situation changed and now many ordinary Chinese people identify themselves as descendants of dragons.

The impression of dragons in a large number of Asian countries has been influenced by Chinese culture, such as Korea, Vietnam, Japan, and so on. Chinese tradition has always used the dragon totem as the national emblem, and the "Yellow Dragon flag" of the Qing dynasty has influenced the impression that China is a dragon in many European countries.

=== Korea ===
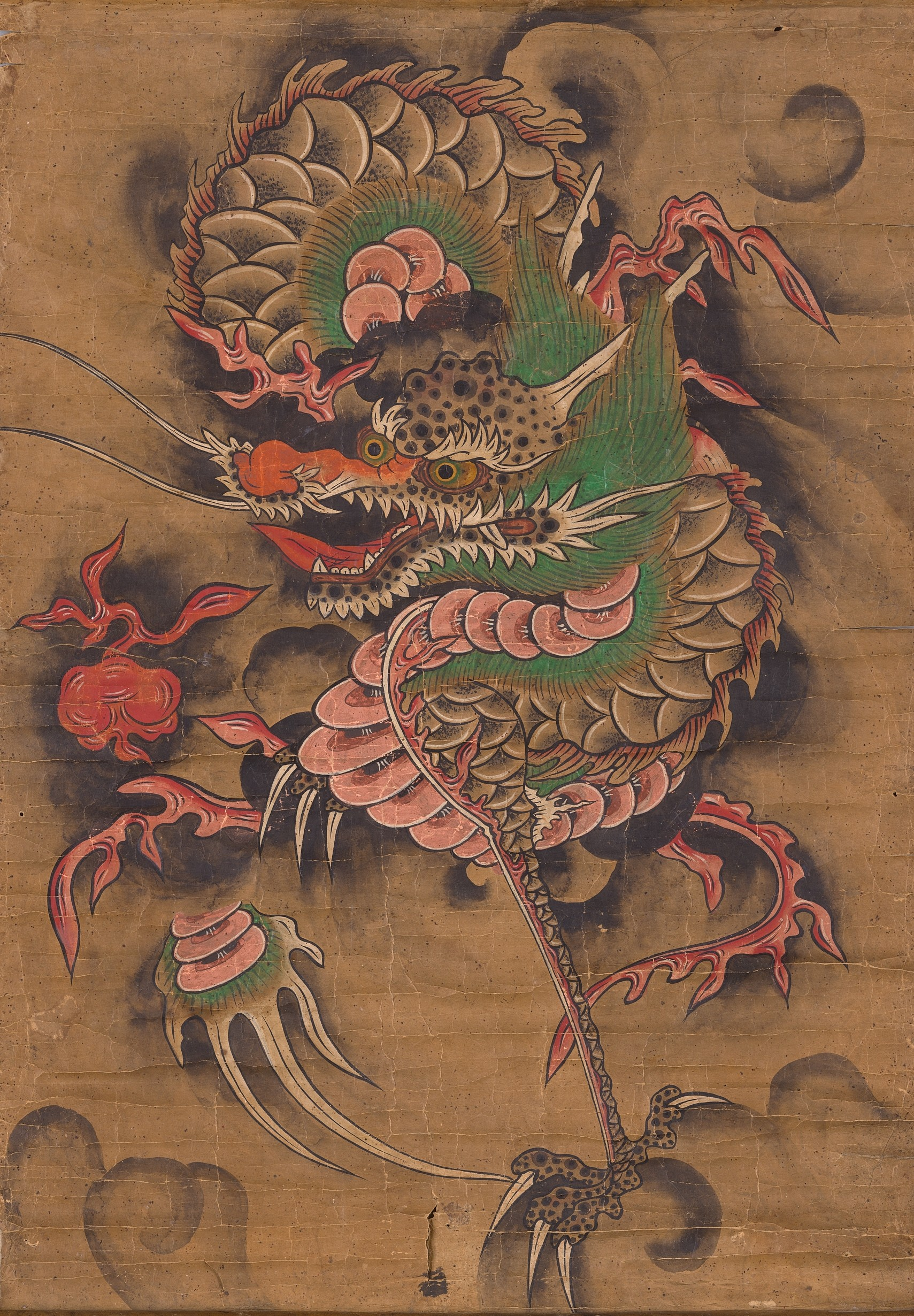
Ullyongdo (Painting of a Dragon in Clouds), Anonymous, Joseon Dynasty, National Museum of Korea

The Korean dragon is in many ways similar in appearance to other East Asian dragons such as the Chinese and Japanese dragons. It differs from the Chinese dragon in that it developed a longer beard. Very occasionally, a dragon may be depicted as carrying an orb known as the Yeouiju (여의주), the Korean name for the mythical Cintamani, in its claws or its mouth. It was said that whoever could wield the Yeouiju was blessed with the abilities of omnipotence and creation at will, and that only four-toed dragons (who had thumbs with which to hold the orbs) were both wise and powerful enough to wield these orbs, as opposed to the lesser, three-toed dragons. As with China, the number nine is significant and auspicious in Korea, and dragons were said to have 81 (9×9) scales on their backs, representing yang essence. Dragons in Korean mythology are primarily benevolent beings related to water and agriculture, often considered bringers of rain and clouds. Hence, many Korean dragons are said to have resided in rivers, lakes, oceans, or even deep mountain ponds. And human journeys to undersea realms, and especially the undersea palace of the Dragon King (용왕), are common in Korean folklore.

In Korean myths, some kings who founded kingdoms were described as descendants of dragons because the dragon was a symbol of the monarch. Lady Aryeong, who was the first queen of Silla, is said to have been born from a cockatrice, while the grandmother of Taejo of Goryeo, founder of Goryeo, was reportedly the daughter of the dragon king of the West Sea. And King Munmu of Silla who, on his deathbed, wished to become a dragon of the East Sea in order to protect the kingdom. Dragon patterns were used exclusively by the royal family. The royal robe was also called the dragon robe (용포). In the Joseon period, the royal insignia, featuring embroidered dragons, were attached to the robe's shoulders, the chest, and back. The King wore five-taloned dragon insignia while the Crown Prince wore four-taloned dragon insignia.

Korean folk mythology states that most dragons were originally imugis (이무기), or lesser dragons, which were said to resemble gigantic serpents. There are a few different versions of Korean folklore that describe both what imugis are and how they aspire to become full-fledged dragons. Koreans thought that an Imugi could become a true dragon, yong or mireu, if it caught a Yeouiju which had fallen from heaven. Another explanation states they are hornless creatures resembling dragons who have been cursed and thus were unable to become dragons. By other accounts, an Imugi is a proto-dragon which must survive one thousand years in order to become a fully-fledged dragon. In either case, they are said to be large, benevolent, python-like creatures that live in water or caves, and their sighting is associated with good luck.

=== Japan ===
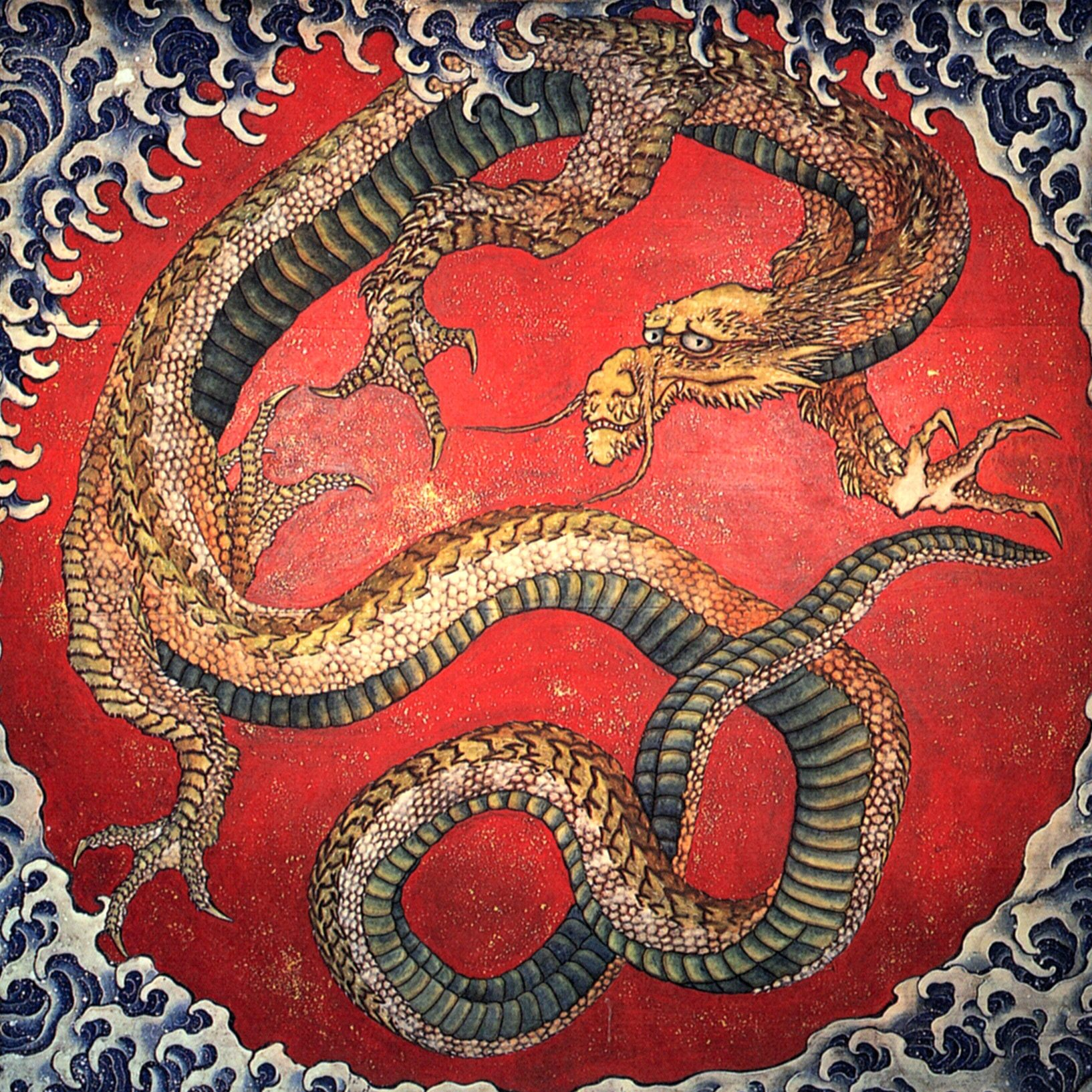
Painting of a Japanese dragon by Hokusai (c. 1730 – 1849)

Japanese dragon myths amalgamate native legends with imported stories about dragons from China. Like some other dragons, most Japanese dragons are water deities associated with rainfall and bodies of water, and are typically depicted as large, wingless, serpentine creatures with clawed feet. Gould writes (1896:248), the Japanese dragon is "invariably figured as possessing three claws". A story about the samurai Minamoto no Mitsunaka tells that, while he was hunting in his own territory of Settsu, he dreamt under a tree and had a dream in which a beautiful woman appeared to him and begged him to save her land from a giant serpent which was defiling it. Mitsunaka agreed to help and the maiden gave him a magnificent horse. When he woke up, the seahorse was standing before him. He rode it to the Sumiyoshi temple, where he prayed for eight days. Then he confronted the serpent and slew it with an arrow.

It was believed that dragons could be appeased or exorcised with metal. Nitta Yoshisada is said to have hurled a famous sword into the sea at Sagami to appease the dragon-god of the sea and Ki no Tsurayuki threw a metal mirror into the sea at Sumiyoshi for the same purpose. Japanese Buddhism has also adapted dragons by subjecting them to Buddhist law; the Japanese Buddhist deities Benten and Kwannon are often shown sitting or standing on the back of a dragon. Several Japanese sennin ("immortals") have taken dragons as their mounts. Bômô is said to have hurled his staff into a puddle of water, causing a dragon to come forth and let him ride it to heaven. The rakan Handaka is said to have been able to conjure a dragon out of a bowl, which he is often shown playing with on kagamibuta. The shachihoko is a creature with the head of a dragon, a bushy tail, fishlike scales, and sometimes with fire emerging from its armpits. The fun has the head of a dragon, feathered wings, and the tail and claws of a bird. A white dragon was believed to reside in a pool in Yamashiro Province and, every fifty years, it would turn into a bird called the Ogonchô, which had a call like the "howling of a wild dog". This event was believed to herald terrible famine. In the Japanese village of Okumura, near Edo, during times of drought, the villagers would make a dragon effigy out of straw, magnolia leaves, and bamboo and parade it through the village to attract rainfall.

=== Vietnam ===
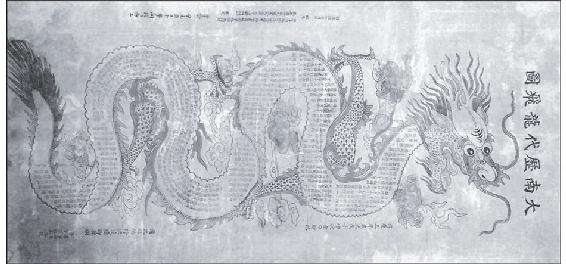
Stylised map of Đại Nam (Minh Mạng period)

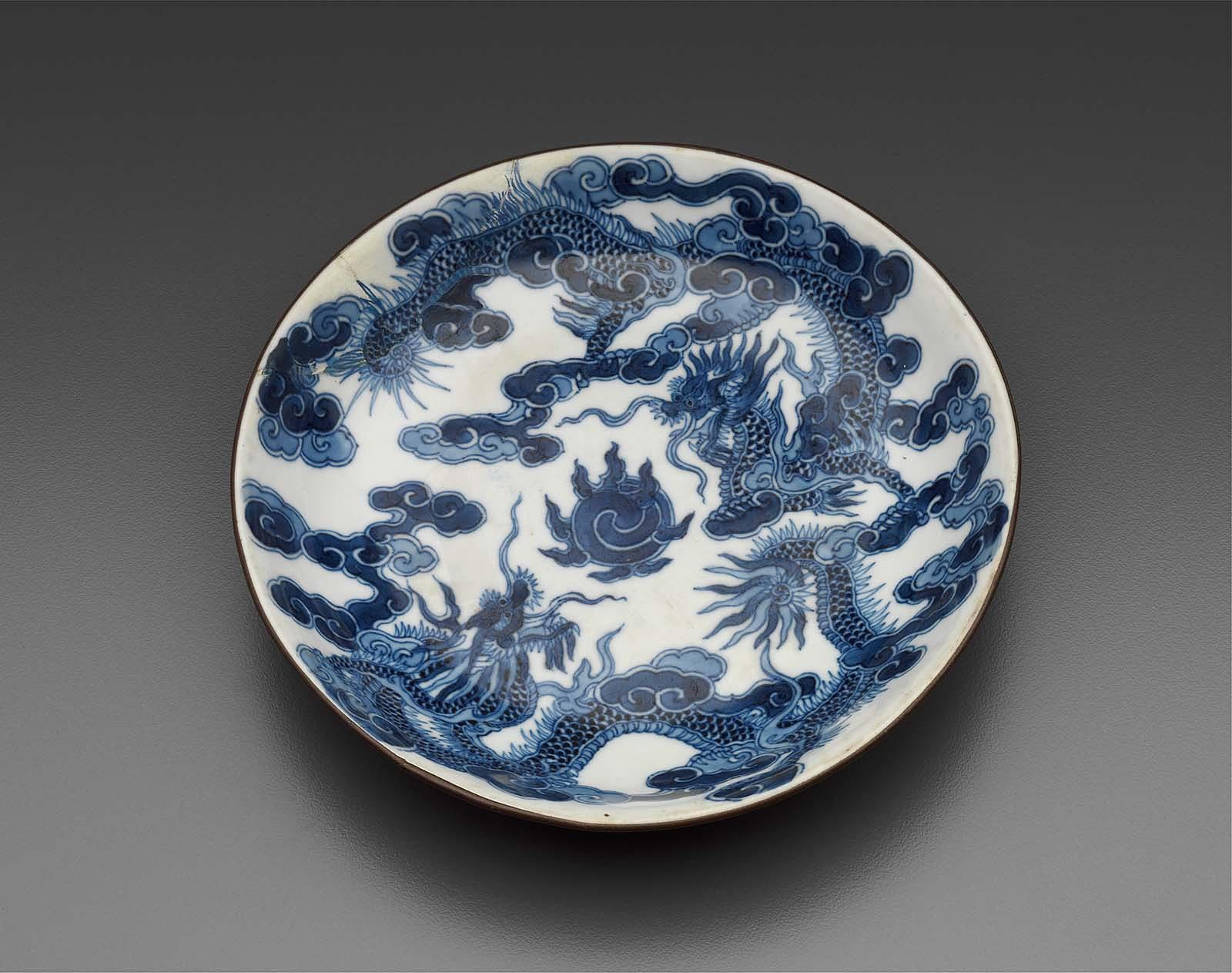
Dragon on a porcelain plate during the reign of Lord Trịnh Doanh, Revival Lê dynasty

The Vietnamese dragon (Vietnamese: rồng) was a mythical creature that was often used as a deity symbol and was associated with royalty. Similar to other cultures, dragons in Vietnamese culture represent yang and godly beings associated with creation and life. In the creation myth of the Vietnamese people, they are descended from the dragon lord Lạc Long Quân and the fairy Âu Cơ, who bore 100 eggs. When they separated, Lạc Long Quân brought 50 children to the sea while Âu Cơ brought the rest up the mountains. To this day, Vietnamese people often describe themselves as "Children of the dragon, grandchildren of the fairy" (Con rồng cháu tiên).

== South Asia ==
=== India ===
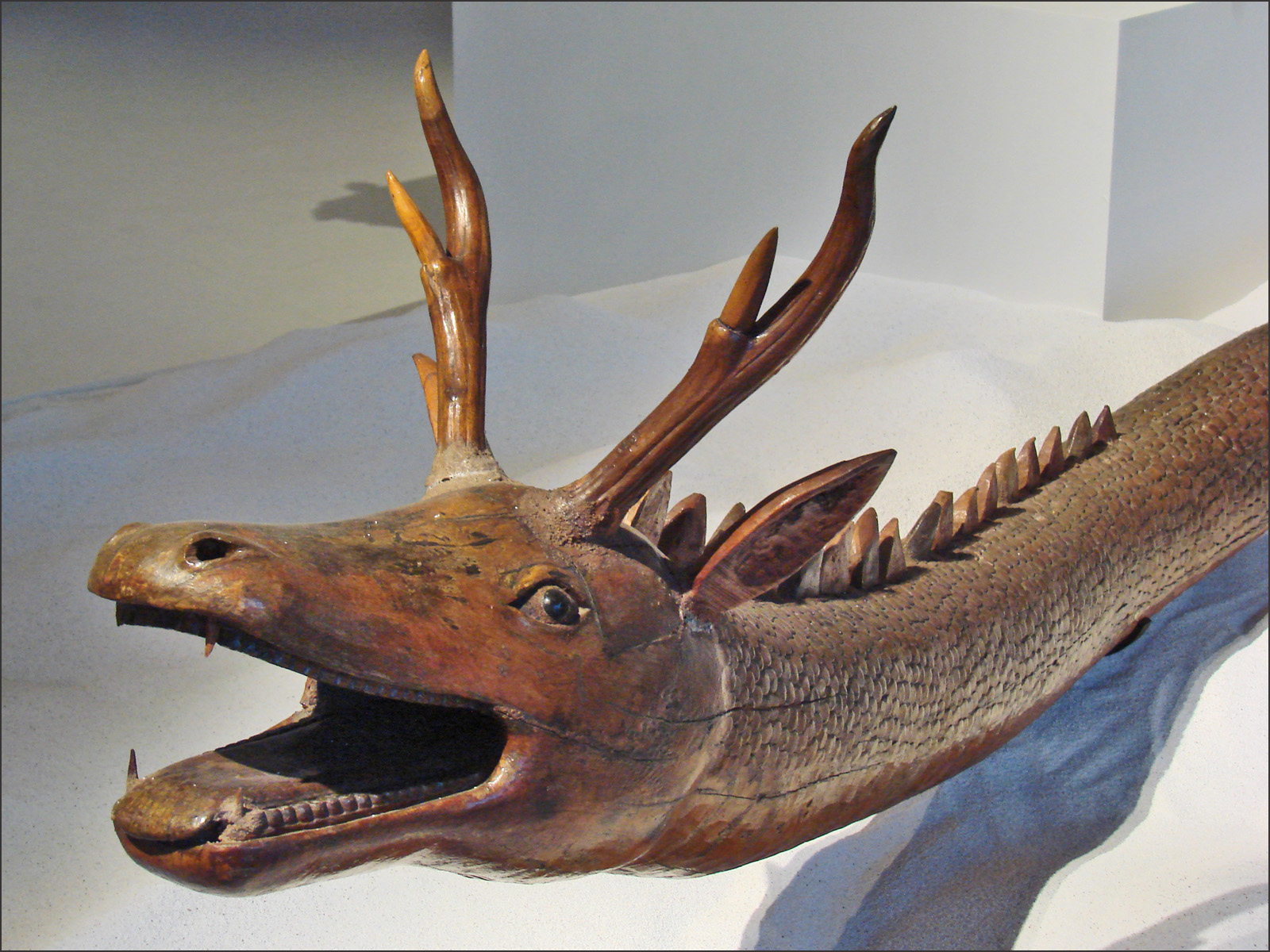
Head of the dragon-god Pakhangba depicted on a musical instrument from Manipur, India

In the Rigveda, the oldest of the four Vedas, Indra, the Vedic god of storms, battles Vṛtra, a giant serpent who represents drought. Indra kills Vṛtra using his vajra (thunderbolt) and clears the path for rain, which is described in the form of cattle: "You won the cows, hero, you won the Soma,/You freed the seven streams to flow" (Rigveda 1.32.12). In another Rigvedic legend, the three-headed serpent Viśvarūpa, the son of Tvaṣṭṛ, guards a wealth of cows and horses. Indra delivers Viśvarūpa to a god named Trita Āptya, who fights and kills him and sets his cattle free. Indra cuts off Viśvarūpa's heads and drives the cattle home for Trita. This same story is alluded to in the Younger Avesta, in which the hero Thraētaona, the son of Āthbya, slays the three-headed dragon Aži Dahāka and takes his two beautiful wives as spoils. Thraētaona's name (meaning "third grandson of the waters") indicates that Aži Dahāka, like Vṛtra, was seen as a blocker of waters and cause of drought.

=== Bhutan ===
The Druk (Dzongkha: འབྲུག་), also known as 'Thunder Dragon', is one of the national symbols of Bhutan. In the Dzongkha language, Bhutan is known as Druk Yul "Land of Druk", and Bhutanese leaders are called Druk Gyalpo, "Thunder Dragon Kings". The druk was adopted as an emblem by the Drukpa Lineage, which originated in Tibet and later spread to Bhutan.

== Europe ==
=== Proto-Indo-European ===
The tale of a hero slaying a giant serpent occurs in almost all Indo-European mythology. In most stories, the hero is some kind of thunder-god. In nearly every iteration of the story, the serpent is either multi-headed or "multiple" in some other way. Furthermore, in nearly every story, the serpent is always somehow associated with water. Bruce Lincoln has proposed that a Proto-Indo-European dragon-slaying myth can be reconstructed as follows: First, the sky gods give cattle to a man named *Tritos ("the third"), who is so named because he is the third man on earth, but a three-headed serpent named *Ngʷhi steals them. *Tritos pursues the serpent and is accompanied by *H_{a}nér, whose name means "man". Together, the two heroes slay the serpent and rescue the cattle.

=== Ancient Greece ===
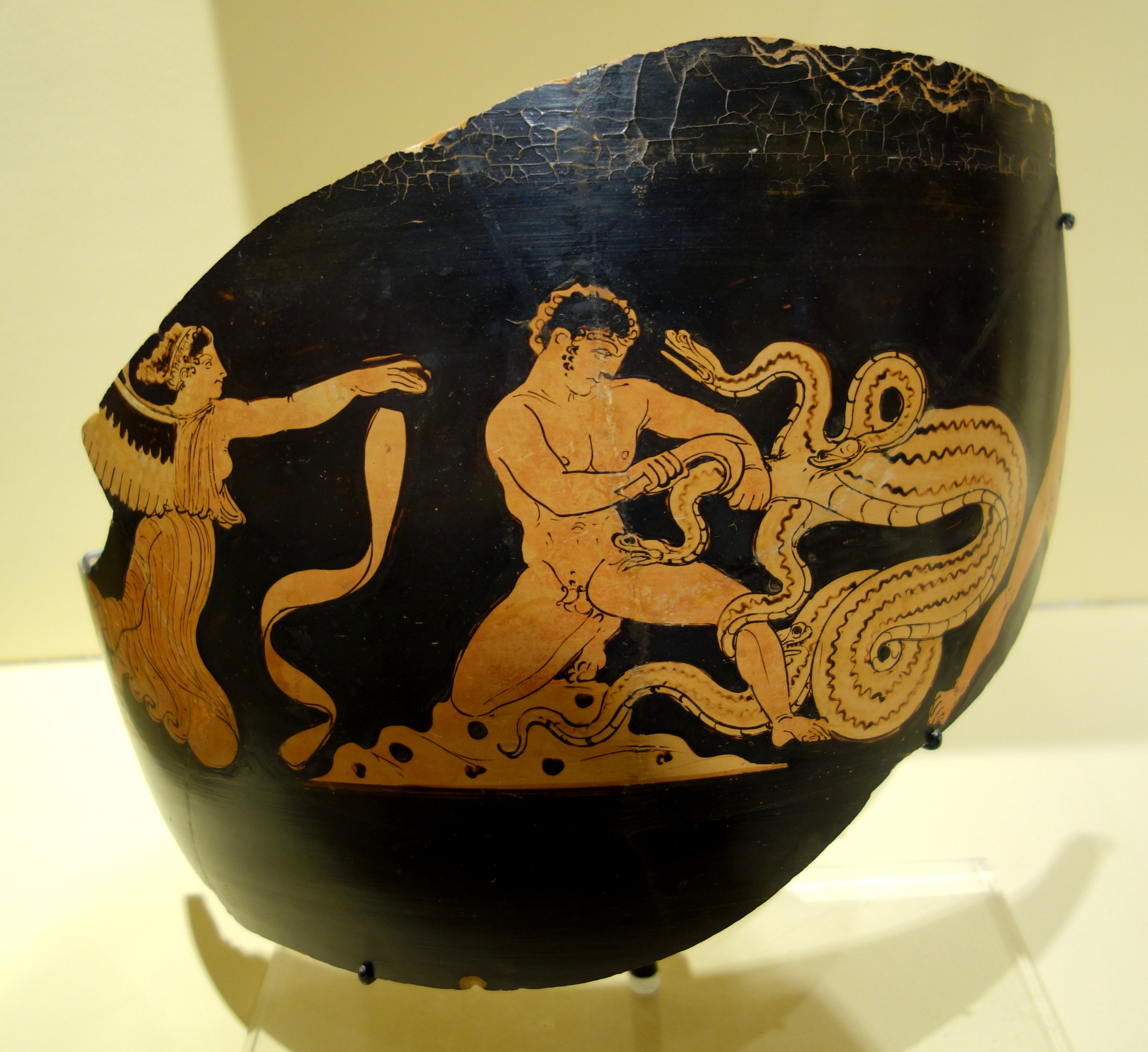
Greek red-figure vase painting depicting Heracles slaying the Lernaean Hydra, c. 375–340 BC

The ancient Greek word usually translated as "dragon" (δράκων drákōn, genitive δράκοντοϛ drákontos) could also mean "snake", but it usually refers to a kind of giant serpent that either possesses supernatural characteristics or is otherwise controlled by some supernatural power. Scholar Daniel Ogden characterizes the ancient Greek word as meaning "a snake and something more". The first mention of a "dragon" in ancient Greek literature occurs in the Iliad, in which Agamemnon is described as having a blue dragon motif on his sword belt and an emblem of a three-headed dragon on his breast plate. In lines 820–880 of the Theogony, a Greek poem written in the seventh century BC by the Boeotian poet Hesiod, the Greek god Zeus battles the monster Typhon, who has one hundred serpent heads that breathe fire and make many frightening animal noises. Zeus scorches all of Typhon's heads with his lightning bolts and then hurls Typhon into Tartarus. In other Greek sources, Typhon is often depicted as a winged, fire-breathing serpent-like dragon. In the Homeric Hymn to Apollo, the god Apollo uses his poisoned arrows to slay the serpent Python, who has been causing death and pestilence in the area around Delphi. Apollo then sets up his shrine there.

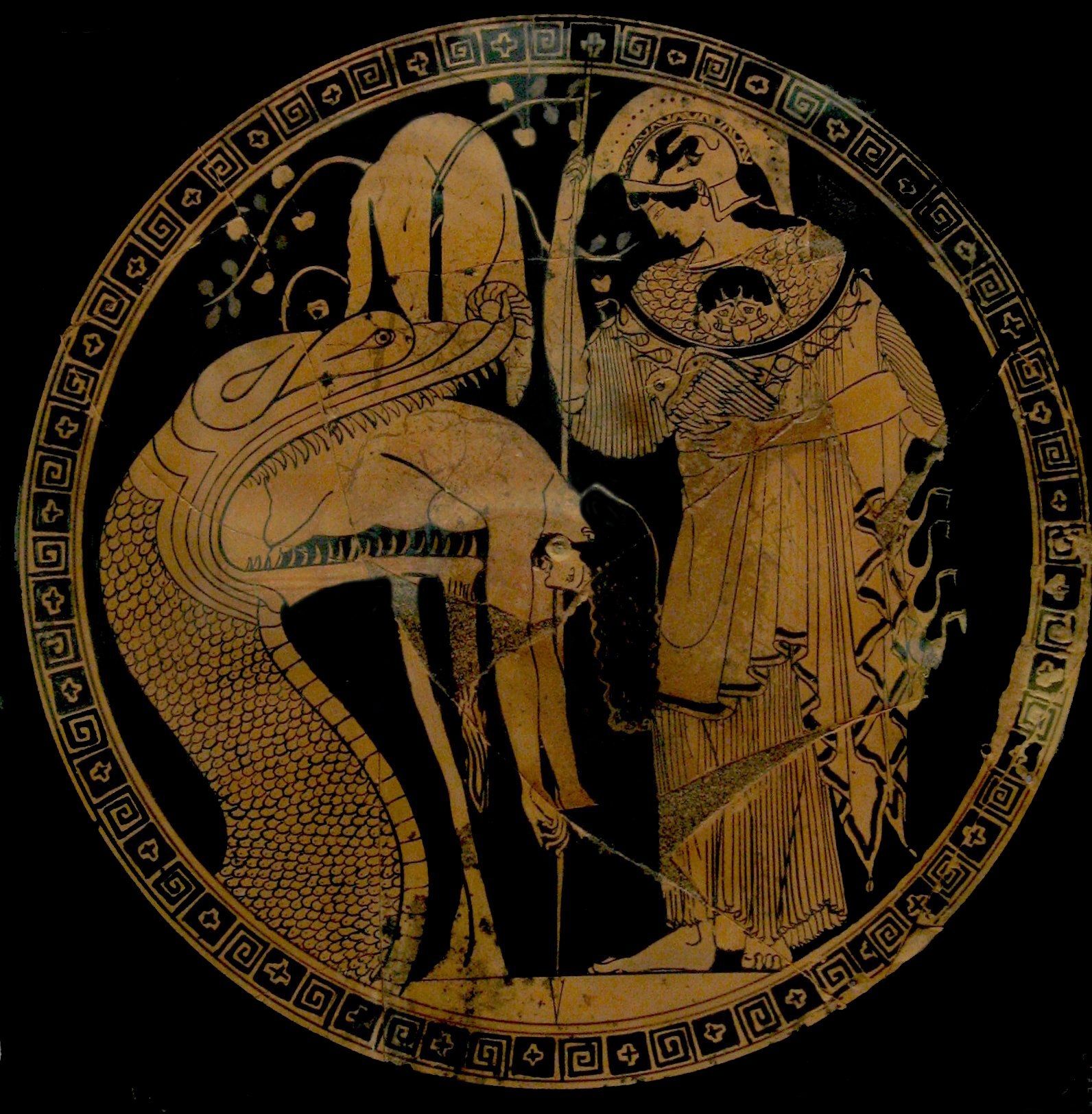
Attic red-figure kylix painting from c. 480–470 BC showing Athena observing as the Colchian dragon disgorges the hero Jason

Hesiod also mentions that the hero Heracles slew the Lernaean Hydra, a multiple-headed serpent which dwelt in the swamps of Lerna. The name "Hydra" means "water snake" in Greek. According to the Bibliotheka of Pseudo-Apollodorus, the slaying of the Hydra was the second of the Twelve Labors of Heracles. Accounts disagree on which weapon Heracles used to slay the Hydra, but, by the end of the sixth century BC, it was agreed that the clubbed or severed heads needed to be cauterized to prevent them from growing back. Heracles was aided in this task by his nephew Iolaus. During the battle, a giant crab crawled out of the marsh and pinched Heracles's foot, but he crushed it under his heel. Hera placed the crab in the sky as the constellation Cancer. One of the Hydra's heads was immortal, so Heracles buried it under a heavy rock after cutting it off. For his Eleventh Labor, Heracles must procure a golden apple from the tree in the Garden of the Hesperides, which is guarded by an enormous serpent that never sleeps, which Pseudo-Apollodorus calls "Ladon". In earlier depictions, Ladon is often shown with many heads. In Pseudo-Apollodorus's account, Ladon is immortal, but Sophocles and Euripides both describe Heracles as killing him, although neither of them specifies how. Some suggest that the golden apple was not claimed through battle with Ladon at all but through Heracles charming the Hesperides. The mythographer Herodorus is the first to state that Heracles slew him using his famous club. Apollonius of Rhodes, in his epic poem, the Argonautica, describes Ladon as having been shot full of poisoned arrows dipped in the blood of the Hydra.

In Pindar's Fourth Pythian Ode, Aeëtes of Colchis tells the hero Jason that the Golden Fleece he is seeking is in a copse guarded by a dragon, "which surpassed in breadth and length a fifty-oared ship". Jason slays the dragon and makes off with the Golden Fleece together with his co-conspirator, Aeëtes's daughter, Medea. The earliest artistic representation of this story is an Attic red-figure kylix dated to c. 480–470 BC, showing a bedraggled Jason being disgorged from the dragon's open mouth as the Golden Fleece hangs in a tree behind him and Athena, the goddess of wisdom, stands watching. A fragment from Pherecydes of Athens states that Jason killed the dragon, but fragments from the Naupactica and from Herodorus state that he merely stole the Fleece and escaped. In Euripides's Medea, Medea boasts that she killed the Colchian dragon herself. In the final scene of the play, Medea also flies away on a chariot pulled by two dragons. In the most famous retelling of the story from Apollonius of Rhodes's Argonautica, Medea drugs the dragon to sleep, allowing Jason to steal the Fleece. Greek vase paintings show her feeding the dragon the sleeping drug in a liquid form from a phialē, or shallow cup.

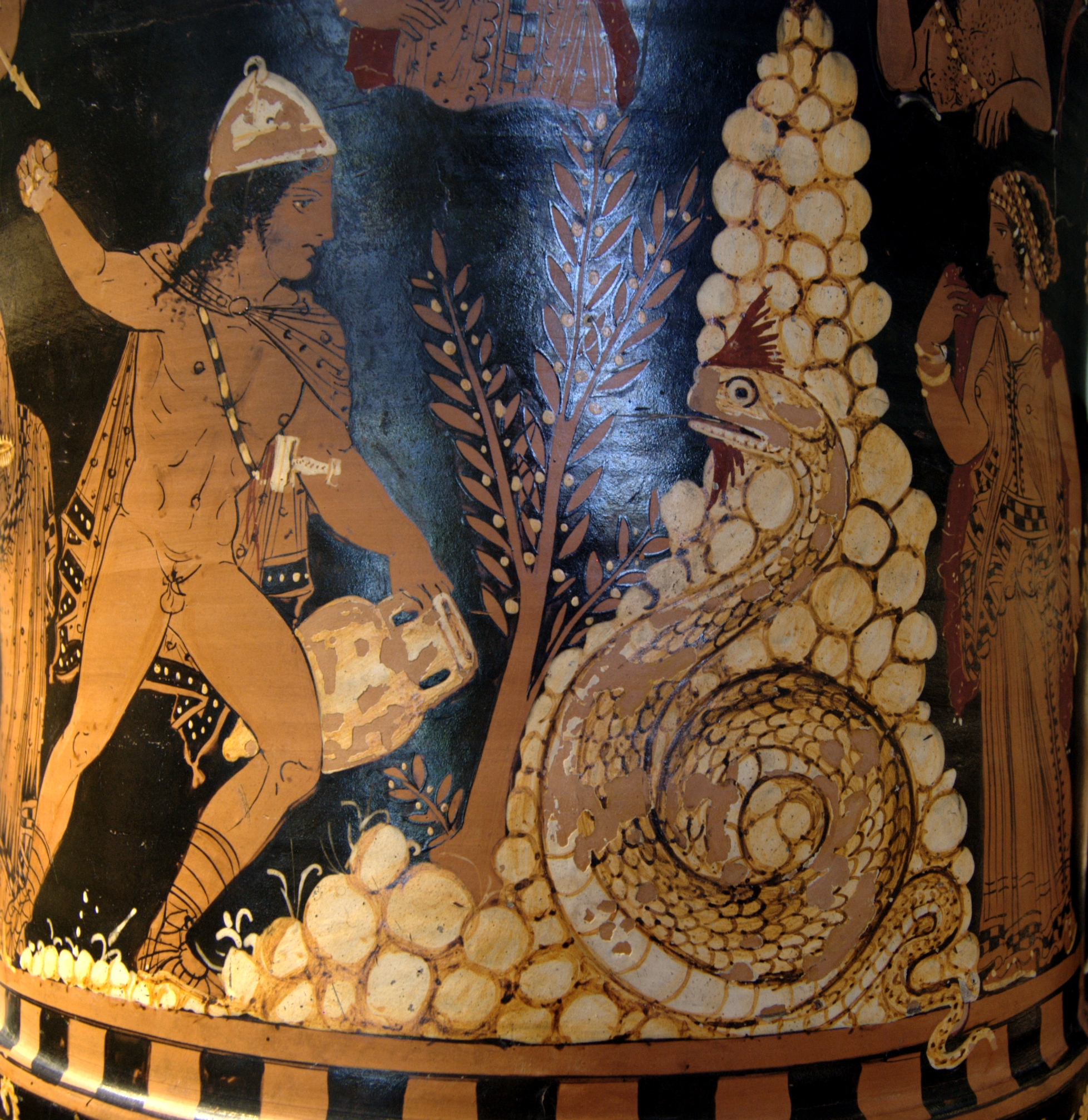
Paestan red-figure kylix-krater (c. 350–340 BC) showing Cadmus fighting the dragon of Ares

In the founding myth of Thebes, Cadmus, a Phoenician prince, was instructed by Apollo to follow a heifer and found a city wherever it laid down. Cadmus and his men followed the heifer and, when it laid down, Cadmus ordered his men to find a spring so he could sacrifice the heifer to Athena. His men found a spring, but it was guarded by a dragon, which had been placed there by the god Ares, and the dragon killed them. Cadmus killed the dragon in revenge, either by smashing its head with a rock or using his sword. Following the advice of Athena, Cadmus tore out the dragon's teeth and planted them in the earth. An army of giant warriors (known as spartoi, which means "sown men") grew from the teeth like plants. Cadmus hurled stones into their midst, causing them to kill each other until only five were left. To make restitution for having killed Ares's dragon, Cadmus was forced to serve Ares as a slave for eight years. At the end of this period, Cadmus married Harmonia, the daughter of Ares and Aphrodite. Cadmus and Harmonia moved to Illyria, where they ruled as king and queen, before eventually being transformed into dragons themselves.

In the fifth century BC, the Greek historian Herodotus reported in Book IV of his Histories that western Libya was inhabited by monstrous serpents and, in Book III, he states that Arabia was home to many small, winged serpents, which came in a variety of colors and enjoyed the trees that produced frankincense. Herodotus remarks that the serpent's wings were like those of bats and that, unlike vipers, which are found in every land, winged serpents are only found in Arabia. The second-century BC Greek astronomer Hipparchus (c. 190 BC – c. 120 BC) listed the constellation Draco ("the dragon") as one of forty-six constellations. Hipparchus described the constellation as containing fifteen stars, but the later astronomer Ptolemy (c. 100 – c. 170 AD) increased this number to thirty-one in his Almagest.

In the New Testament, Revelation 12:3, written by John of Patmos, describes a vision of a Great Red Dragon with seven heads, ten horns, seven crowns, and a massive tail, an image which is clearly inspired by the vision of the four beasts from the sea in the Book of Daniel and the Leviathan described in various Old Testament passages. The Great Red Dragon knocks "a third of the sun ... a third of the moon, and a third of the stars" out of the sky and pursues the Woman of the Apocalypse. Revelation 12:7–9 declares: "And war broke out in Heaven. Michael and his angels fought against Dragon. Dragon and his angels fought back, but they were defeated, and there was no longer any place for them in Heaven. Dragon the Great was thrown down, that ancient serpent who is called Devil and Satan, the one deceiving the whole inhabited World – he was thrown down to earth and his angels were thrown down with him." Then a voice booms down from Heaven heralding the defeat of "the Accuser" (ho Kantegor).

In 217 AD, Flavius Philostratus discussed dragons (δράκων, drákōn) in India in The Life of Apollonius of Tyana (II,17 and III,6–8). The Loeb Classical Library translation (by F.C. Conybeare) mentions (III,7) that, "In most respects the tusks resemble the largest swine's, but they are slighter in build and twisted, and have a point as unabraded as sharks' teeth." According to a collection of books by Claudius Aelianus called On Animals, Ethiopia was inhabited by a species of dragon that hunted elephants and could grow to a length of 180 feet (55 m) with a lifespan rivaling that of the most enduring of animals. In the 4th century, Basil of Caesarea, on chapter IX of his Address to Young Men on Greek Literature, mentions mythological dragons as guarding treasures and riches.

=== Ancient Rome ===
In Latin, dragons were known as dracones (sing. draco) – a term derived from the Greek drakōn – or serpentēs ('serpents'). The Roman conception of dragons was largely borrowed from Greece, though the Romans provided more elaborate and extensive accounts of dragon battles that appeared in Greek mythology. In these retellings, they often gave greater emphasis to the dragons themselves, who were sometimes anthropomorphised and – according to Ogden – "treated with a certain degree of sympathy". The Romans created few original dragon myths, the only notable example being the story of the Dragon of the Bagrada river (now known as the Medjerda River, located in modern-day Algeria and Tunisia). In this tale, which is attested from the 1st century BC and set during the First Punic War, Marcus Atilius Regulus and his army encounter a giant snake, which does not allow them to pass through the river, consuming and crushing a number of soldiers. The serpent is impervious to javelins, and is defeated by means of ballistas; its skin, measuring 120 feet, is stripped from its corpse. Silius Italicus provides the most detailed account of the story, writing that the serpent inhabited a cave and exuded a pungent odour. The Roman poet Virgil, in his poem Culex, describes a shepherd having a fight with a large constricting snake.

=== Germanic ===
Drawing of the Ramsund carving from c. 1030, illustrating the Völsunga saga on a rock in Sweden. At (5), Sigurd plunges his sword into Fafnir's underside.

In the Old Norse poem Grímnismál in the Poetic Edda, the dragon Níðhöggr is described as gnawing on the roots of Yggdrasil, the world tree. In Norse mythology, Jörmungandr is a giant serpent that encircles the entire realm of Miðgarð in the sea around it. According to the Gylfaginning from the Prose Edda, written by the thirteenth-century Icelandic mythographer Snorri Sturluson, Thor, the Norse god of thunder, once went out on a boat with the giant Hymnir to the outer sea and fished for Jörmungandr using an ox-head as bait. Thor caught the serpent and, after pulling its head out of the water, smashed it with his hammer, Mjölnir. Snorri states that the blow was not fatal: "and men say that he struck its head off on the sea bed. But I think the truth to tell you is that the Miðgarð Serpent still lives and lies in the surrounding sea."

Towards the end of the Old English epic poem Beowulf, a slave steals a cup from the hoard of a sleeping dragon, causing the dragon to wake up and go on a rampage of destruction across the countryside. Beowulf insists on confronting the dragon alone, even though he is of advanced age, but Wiglaf, the youngest of the twelve warriors Beowulf has brought with him, insists on accompanying his king into the battle. Beowulf's sword shatters during the fight and he is mortally wounded, but Wiglaf comes to his rescue and helps him slay the dragon. Beowulf dies and tells Wiglaf that the dragon's treasure must be buried rather than shared with the cowardly warriors who did not come to the aid of their king.

In the Old Norse Völsunga saga, the hero Sigurd catches the dragon Fafnir by digging a pit between the cave where he lives and the spring where he drinks his water and kills him by stabbing him in the underside. At the advice of Odin, Sigurd drains Fafnir's blood and drinks it, which gives him the ability to understand the language of the birds, who he hears talking about how his mentor Regin is plotting to betray him so that he can keep all of Fafnir's treasure for himself. The motif of a hero trying to sneak past a sleeping dragon and steal some of its treasure is common throughout many Old Norse sagas. The fourteenth-century Flóres saga konungs ok sona hans describes a hero who is actively concerned not to wake a sleeping dragon while sneaking past it. In the Yngvars saga víðförla, the protagonist attempts to steal treasure from several sleeping dragons, but accidentally wakes them up.

=== Post-classical ===
The Welsh Dragon (Y Ddraig Goch).

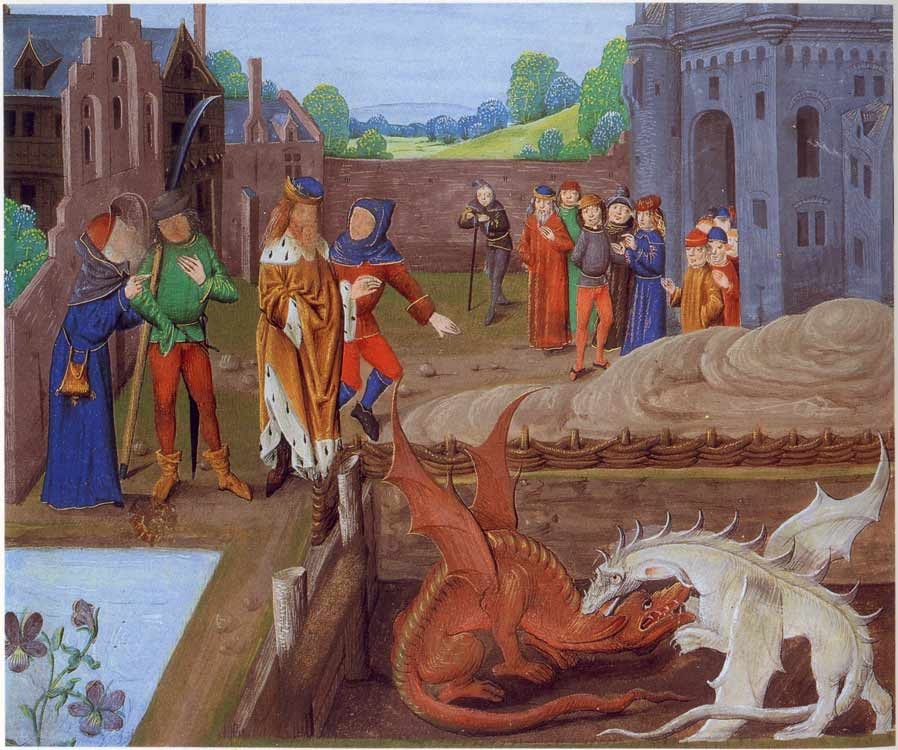
Fifteenth-century manuscript illustration of the battle of the Red and White Dragons from Geoffrey of Monmouth's History of the Kings of Britain

The modern, western image of a dragon developed in western Europe during the Middle Ages through the combination of the snakelike dragons of classical Graeco-Roman literature, references to Near Eastern dragons preserved in the Bible, and western European folk traditions. The period between the eleventh and thirteenth centuries represents the height of European interest in dragons as living creatures. The twelfth-century Welsh monk, Geoffrey of Monmouth, recounts a famous legend in his Historia Regum Britanniae in which the child prophet Merlin witnesses the Romano-Celtic warlord Vortigern attempt to build a tower on Snowdon to keep safe from the Anglo-Saxons, but the tower keeps being swallowed into the ground. Merlin informs Vortigern that, underneath the foundation he has built, is a pool with two dragons sleeping in it. Vortigern orders for the pool to be drained, exposing a red dragon and a white dragon, who immediately begin fighting. Merlin delivers a prophecy that the white dragon will triumph over the red, symbolizing England's conquest of Wales, but declares that the red dragon will eventually return and defeat the white one. This story remained popular throughout the fifteenth century.

Dragons are generally depicted as living in rivers or having an underground lair or cave. They are envisioned as greedy and gluttonous, with voracious appetites. They are often identified with Satan, due to the references to Satan as a "dragon" in the Book of Revelation. The thirteenth-century Golden Legend, written in Latin, records the story of Saint Margaret of Antioch, a virgin martyr who, after being tortured for her faith in the Diocletianic Persecution and thrown back into her cell, is said to have been confronted by a monstrous dragon, but she made the sign of the cross and the dragon vanished. In some versions of the story, she is actually swallowed by the dragon alive and, after making the sign of the cross in the dragon's stomach, emerges unharmed.

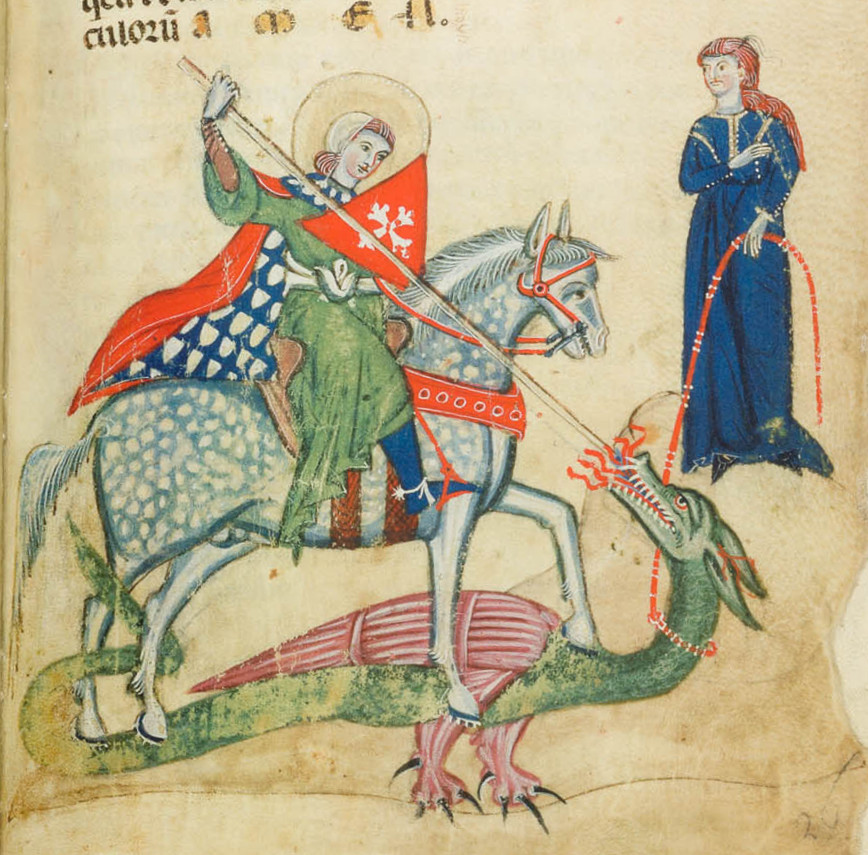
Manuscript illustration from Verona of Saint George slaying the dragon, dating to c. 1270

The legend of Saint George and the Dragon may be referenced as early as the sixth century AD, but the earliest artistic representations of it come from the eleventh century and the first full account of it comes from an eleventh-century Georgian text. The most famous version of the story from the Golden Legend holds that a dragon kept pillaging the sheep of the town of Silene in Libya. After it ate a young shepherd, the people were forced to placate it by leaving two sheep as sacrificial offerings every morning beside the lake where the dragon lived. Eventually, the dragon ate all of the sheep and the people were forced to start offering it their own children. One day, the king's own daughter came up in the lottery and, despite the king's pleas for her life, she was dressed as a bride and chained to a rock beside the lake to be eaten. Then, Saint George arrived and saw the princess. When the dragon arrived to eat her, he stabbed it with his lance and subdued it by making the sign of the cross and tying the princess's girdle around its neck. Saint George and the princess led the now-docile dragon into the town and George promised to kill it if the townspeople would convert to Christianity. All the townspeople converted and Saint George killed the dragon with his sword. In some versions, Saint George marries the princess, but, in others, he continues wandering.

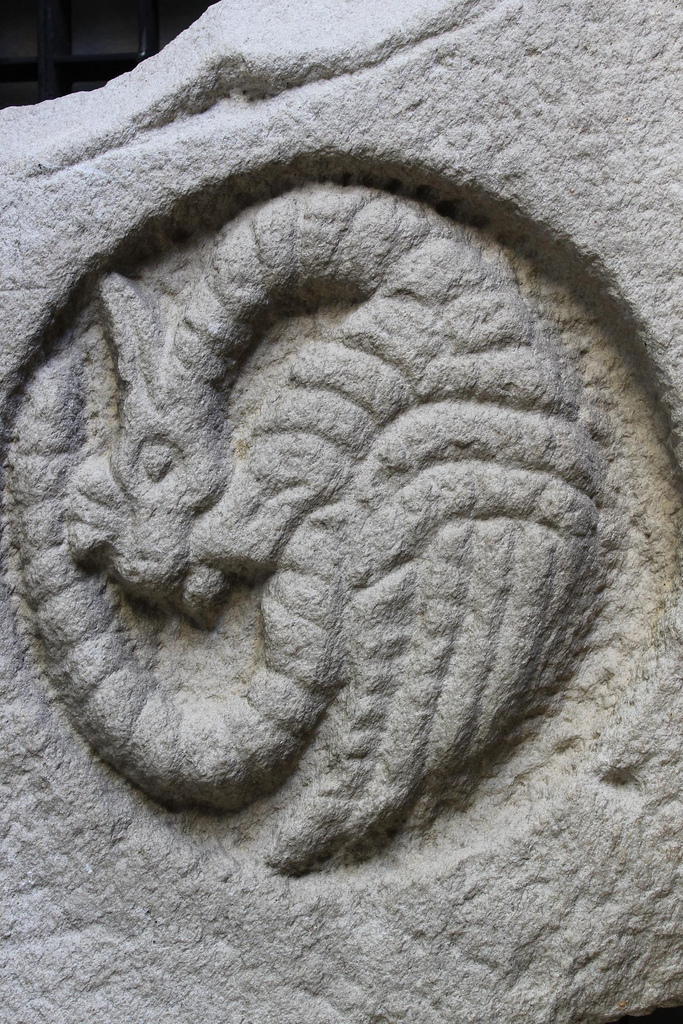
Dragon in a granite Relief (14th century). San Anton Museum (A Coruña, Galicia (Spain)).

Dragons are deeply embedded in Spanish folklore and heraldry, primarily driven by the cultural reverence for Saint George (Catalan Sant Jordi). As the patron saint of Catalonia, his legendary defeat of the beast remains a celebrated regional and mythological cornerstone.

Gargoyles are carved stone figures sometimes resembling dragons that originally served as waterspouts on buildings. Precursors to the medieval gargoyle can be found on ancient Greek and Egyptian temples, but, over the course of the Middle Ages, many fantastic stories were invented to explain them. One medieval French legend holds that, in ancient times, a fearsome dragon known as La Gargouille had been causing floods and sinking ships on the river Seine, so the people of the town of Rouen would offer the dragon a human sacrifice once each year to appease its hunger. Then, around 600 AD, a priest named Romanus promised that, if the people would build a church, he would rid them of the dragon. Romanus slew the dragon and its severed head was mounted on the walls of the city as the first gargoyle.

Dragons are prominent in medieval heraldry. Uther Pendragon was famously said to have had two gold dragons crowned with red standing back-to-back on his royal coat of arms. Originally, heraldic dragons could have any number of legs, but, by the late Middle Ages, due to the widespread proliferation of bestiaries, heraldry began to distinguish between a "dragon" (which could only have exactly four legs) and a "wyvern" (which could only have exactly two). In myths, wyverns are associated with viciousness, envy, and pestilence, but, in heraldry, they are used as symbols for overthrowing the tyranny of Satan and his demonic forces. Late medieval heraldry also distinguished a draconic creature known as a "cockatrice". A cockatrice is supposedly born when a serpent hatches an egg that has been laid on a dunghill by a rooster and it is so venomous that its breath and its gaze are both lethal to any living creature, except for a weasel, which is the cockatrice's mortal enemy. A basilisk is a serpent with the head of a dragon at the end of its tail that is born when a toad hatches an egg that has been laid in a midden by a nine-year-old cockatrice. Like the cockatrice, its glare is said to be deadly.

=== Post-classical Eastern ===
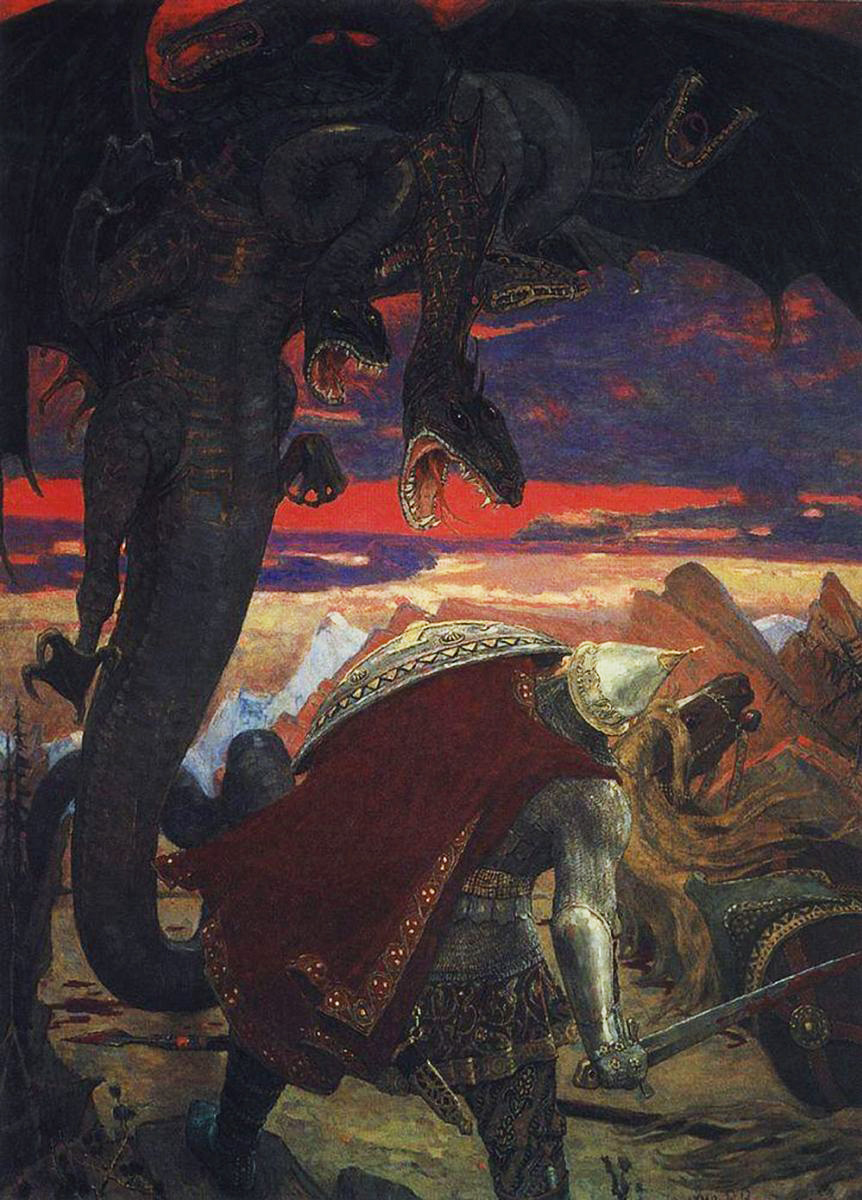
Zmey Gorynych, a three-headed dragon from Russian folklore

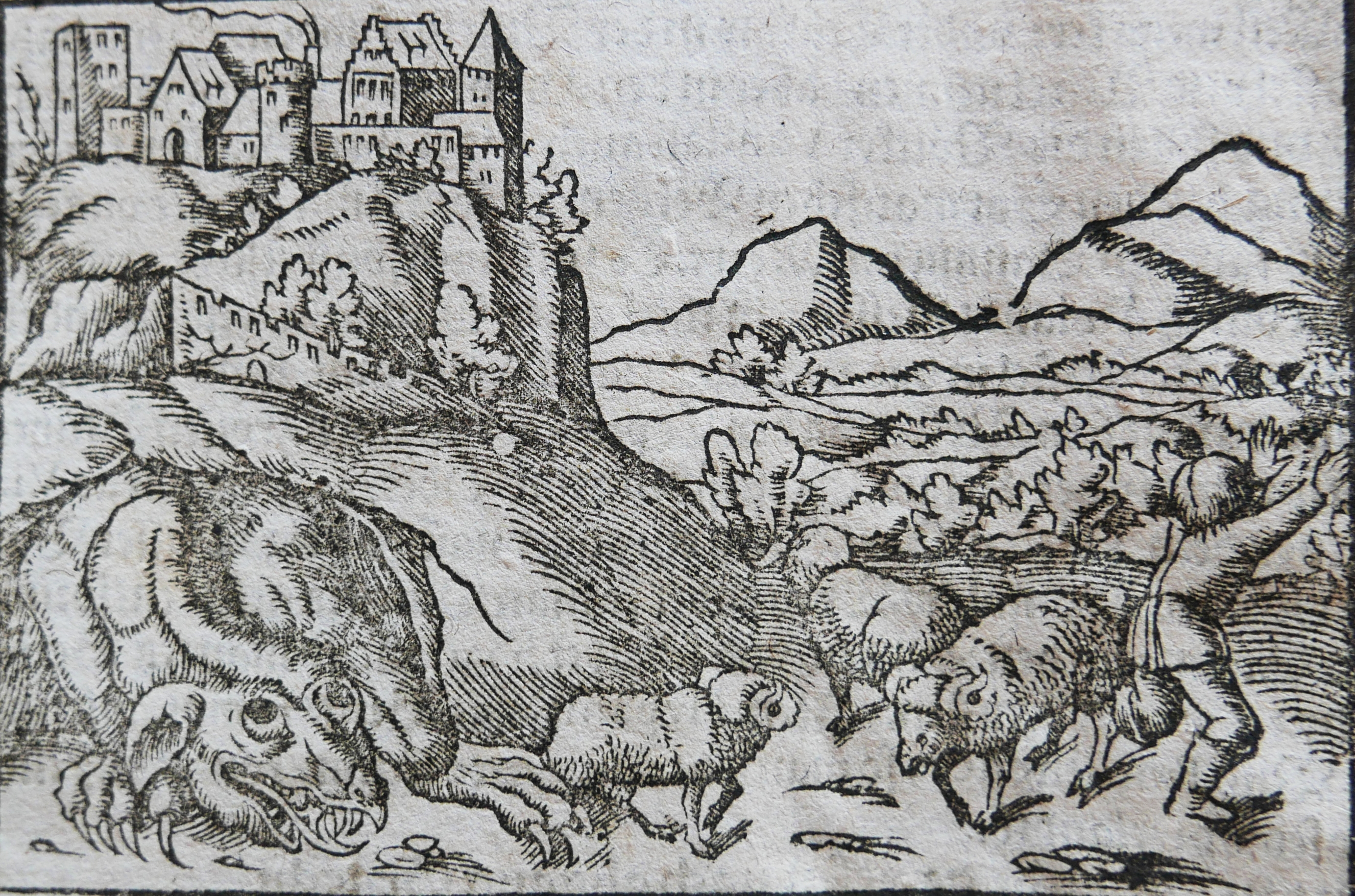
Illustration of the Wawel Dragon from Sebastian Münster's Cosmographie Universalis (1544).

In Albanian mythology and folklore, stihi, ljubi, bolla, bollar, errshaja, and kulshedra are mythological figures described as serpentine dragons. It is believed that bolla, a water and chthonic demonic serpent, undergoes metamorphosis passing through four distinct phases if it lives many years without being seen by a human. The bollar and errshaja are the intermediate stages, while the kulshedra is the ultimate phase, described as a huge multi-headed fire-spitting female serpent which causes drought, storms, flooding, earthquakes, and other natural disasters against mankind. She is usually fought and defeated by a drangue, a semi-human winged divine hero and protector of humans. Heavy thunderstorms are thought to be the result of their battles.

In Slavic mythology, the words "zmey", "zmiy", or "zmaj" are used to describe dragons. These words are masculine forms of the Slavic word for "snake", which are normally feminine (like Russian zmeya). In Romania, there is a similar figure, derived from the Slavic dragon and named zmeu. Exclusively in Polish and Belarusian folklore, as well as in the other Slavic folklores, a dragon is also called (variously) смок, цмок, or smok. In South Slavic folklores, the same thing is also called lamya (ламя, ламjа, lamja). Although quite similar to other European dragons, Slavic dragons have their peculiarities.

In Russian and Ukrainian folklore, Zmey Gorynych is a dragon with three heads, each one bearing twin goatlike horns. He is said to have breathed fire and smelled of sulfur. It was believed that eclipses were caused by Gorynych temporarily swallowing the sun. According to one legend, Gorynych's uncle was the evil sorcerer Nemal Chelovek, who abducted the daughter of the tsar and imprisoned her in his castle in the Ural Mountains. Many knights tried to free her, but all of them were killed by Gorynych's fire. Then a palace guard in Moscow named Ivan Tsarevich overheard two crows talking about the princess. He went to the tsar, who gave him a magic sword, and snuck into the castle. When Chelovek attacked Ivan in the form of a giant, the sword flew from Ivan's hand unbidden and killed him. Then the sword cut off all three of Gorynych's heads at once. Ivan brought the princess back to the tsar, who declared Ivan a nobleman and allowed him to marry the princess.

A popular Polish folk tale is the legend of the Wawel Dragon, which is first recorded in the Chronica Polonorum of Wincenty Kadłubek, written between 1190 and 1208. According to Kadłubek, the dragon appeared during the reign of King Krakus and demanded to be fed a fixed number of cattle every week. If the villagers failed to provide enough cattle, the dragon would eat the same number of villagers as the number of cattle they had failed to provide. Krakus ordered his sons to slay the dragon. Since they could not slay it by hand, they tricked the dragon into eating calfskins filled with burning sulfur. Once the dragon was dead, the younger brother attacked and murdered his older brother and returned home to claim all the glory for himself, telling his father that his brother had died fighting the dragon. The younger brother became king after his father died, but his secret was eventually revealed and he was banished. In the fifteenth century, Jan Długosz rewrote the story so that King Krakus himself was the one who slew the dragon. Another version of the story told by Marcin Bielski instead has the clever shoemaker Skuba come up with the idea for slaying the dragon. Bielski's version is now the most popular.

== Modern depictions ==
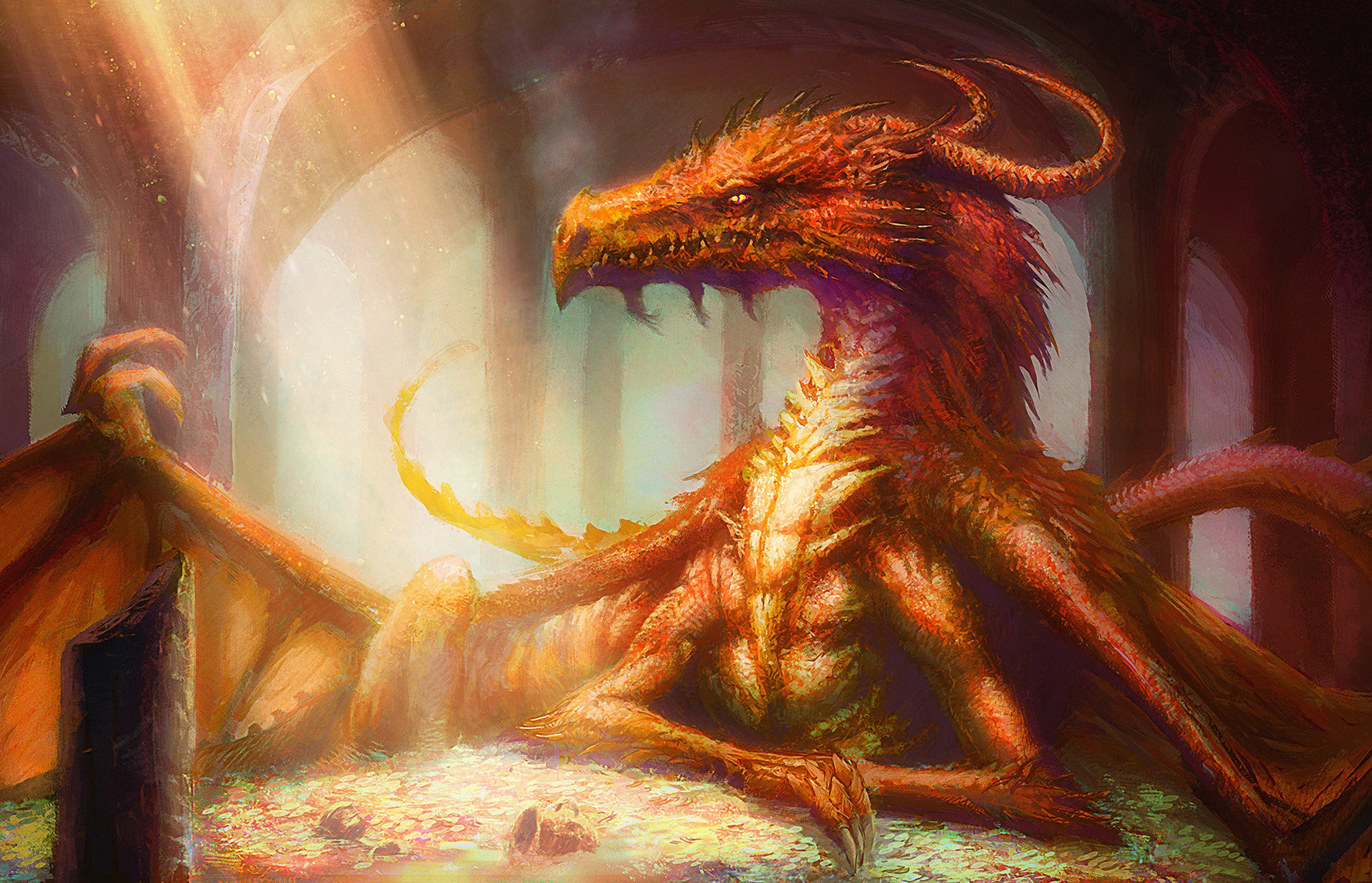
Modern fan illustration by David Demaret of the dragon Smaug from J. R. R. Tolkien's 1937 children's fantasy novel The Hobbit

Dragons and dragon motifs are featured in many works of modern literature, particularly within the fantasy genre. As early as the eighteenth century, critical thinkers such as Denis Diderot were already asserting that too much literature had been published on dragons: "There are already in books all too many fabulous stories of dragons". In Lewis Carroll's classic children's novel Through the Looking-Glass (1871), one of the inset poems describes the Jabberwock, a kind of dragon. Carroll's illustrator John Tenniel, a famous political cartoonist, humorously showed the Jabberwock with the waistcoat, buck teeth, and myopic eyes of a Victorian university lecturer, such as Carroll himself. In works of comedic children's fantasy, dragons often fulfill the role of a magic fairy tale helper. In such works, rather than being frightening as they are traditionally portrayed, dragons are instead represented as harmless, benevolent, and inferior to humans. They are sometimes shown living in contact with humans, or in isolated communities of only dragons. Though popular in the late nineteenth and early twentieth centuries, "such comic and idyllic stories" began to grow increasingly rare after the 1960s, due to demand for more serious children's literature.

One of the most iconic modern dragons is Smaug from J. R. R. Tolkien's classic novel, The Hobbit. Dragons also appear in the best-selling Harry Potter series of children's novels by J. K. Rowling. Other prominent works depicting dragons include Anne McCaffrey's Dragonriders of Pern, Ursula K. Le Guin's Earthsea Cycle, George R. R. Martin's series A Song of Ice and Fire, and Christopher Paolini's The Inheritance Cycle. Sandra Martina Schwab writes that "With a few exceptions, including McCaffrey's Pern novels and the 2002 film Reign of Fire, dragons seem to fit more into the medievalized setting of fantasy literature than into the more technological world of science fiction. Indeed, they have been called the emblem of fantasy. The hero's fight against the dragon emphasizes and celebrates his masculinity, whereas revisionist fantasies of dragons and dragon-slaying often undermine traditional gender roles. In children's literature the friendly dragon may become a powerful ally in battling the child's fears." The popular role-playing game system Dungeons & Dragons (D&D) makes heavy use of dragons.

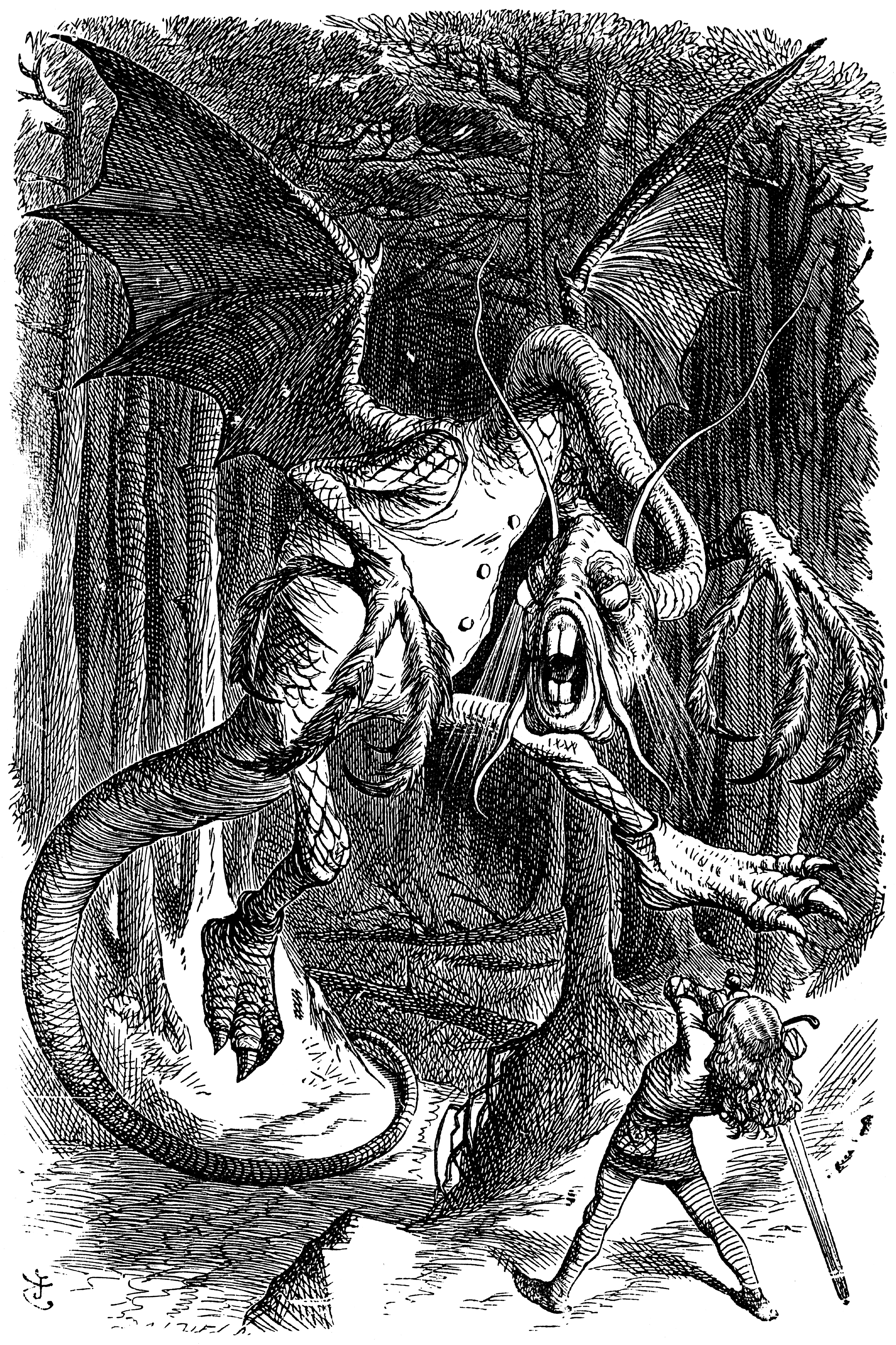
John Tenniel's illustration of the Jabberwock for Lewis Carroll's Through the Looking-Glass, showing the dragon as a myopic professor

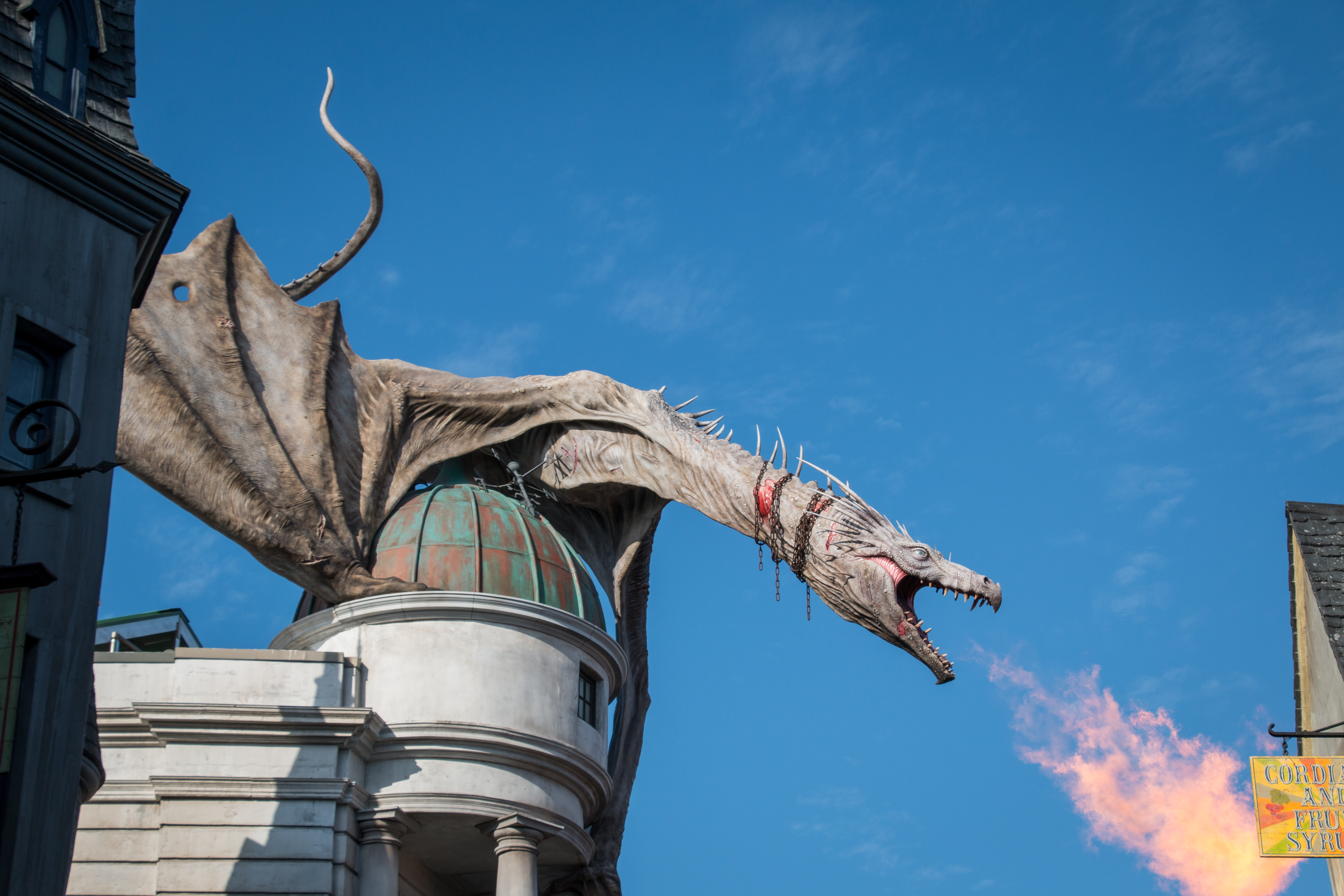
Fire-breathing statue of the Ukrainian Ironbelly from Harry Potter and the Deathly Hallows – Part 2 at Universal Studios Florida

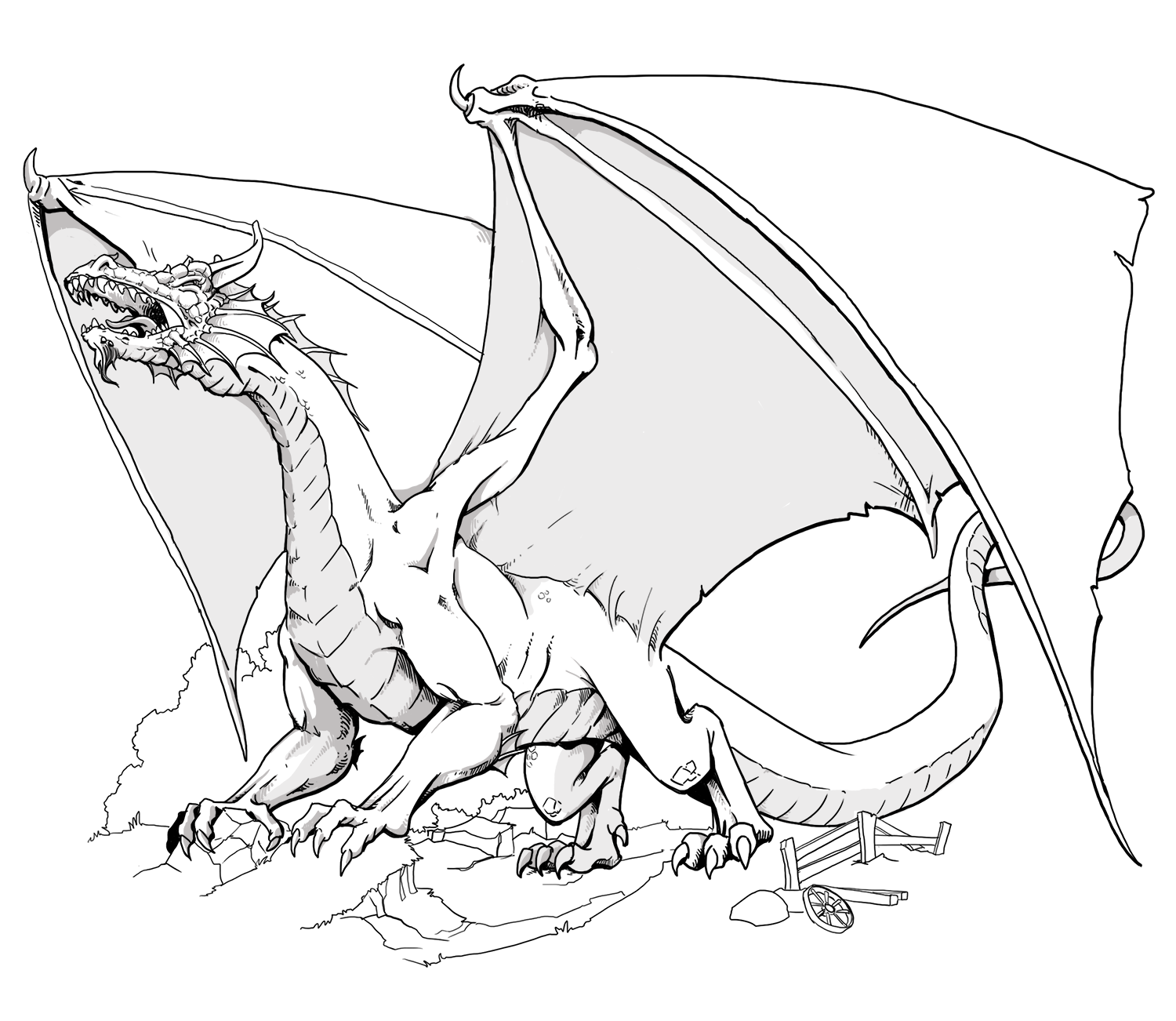
Representation of a dragon as it appears in the role-playing game Dungeons & Dragons

== See also ==
- Balaur
- Bat (heraldry)
- Behemoth
- Dragonology
- Feilong (mythology)
- Firedrake
- Griffin
- Guivre
- Horned Serpent
- Ichneumon (medieval zoology)
- Lambton Worm
- The Last Dragon, fictional 2004 documentary
- Lindworm
- List of dragons in literature
- List of dragons in mythology and folklore
- List of dragons in popular culture
- Mokele-mbembe
- Partridge Creek monster
- Peluda
- Scylla
- Sea serpent
- Snallygaster
