= Yuqiang =

Yuqiang (Chinese: 禺强, alternatively Yujiang 禺疆 or Yujing 禺京), in Chinese mythology is one of the descendants of Huang Di, the "Yellow Emperor". Yuqiang was also the god of the north sea and a wind god. His father was Yuhao, another sea god. Some accounts (Shanhaijing chapters 8 and 17) describe Yuqiang as having the body of a bird and the face of a human being, with a serpent mount for each foot that facilitated his travels.

== See also ==
- Chinese mythology
