= Atter =

Old Germanic term for toxic fluid or venom

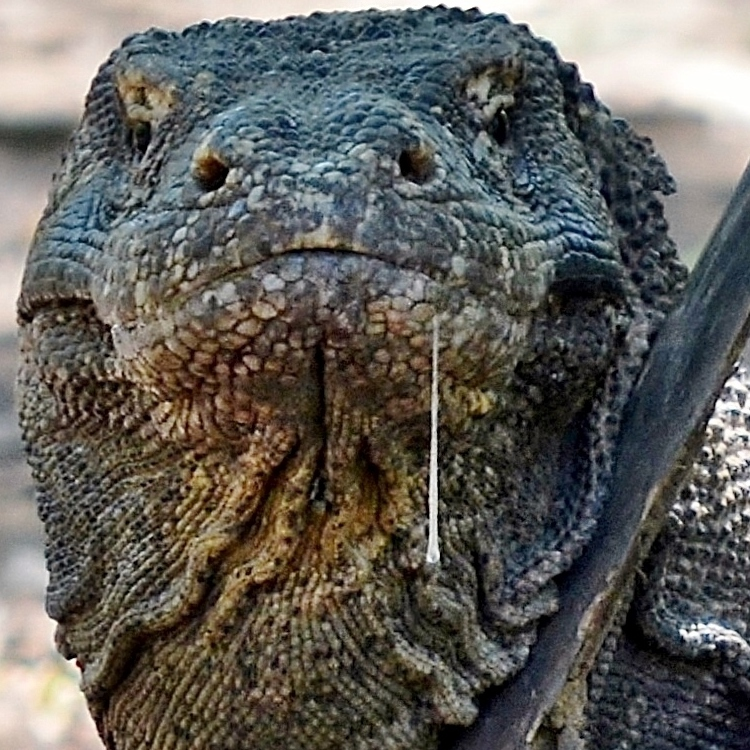
Atter dripping from a Komodo dragon

Atter (Old English: āttor; cf. Old Norse: eitr) is an archaic, and poetic, term for poisonous bodily fluid, especially venom of a venomous animal, such as a snake, dragon or other reptile, but also other vile, corrupt or morbid substance from the body, such as pus from a sore or wound, as well as bitter substance, such as bile. Figuratively, it can also be moral corruption or corruptness; noxious or corrupt influence, poison to the soul, evil, anger, envy, hatred; as well as destruction and death.

Cognates in other Germanic languages are less archaic. Its Nordic cognates (Danish: edder; Faroese: eitur; Icelandic: eitur; Norwegian: eiter; Swedish: etter) are terms for venom and poison, while its Dutch and German cognates (Dutch: etter; German: Eiter) refer to pus.

Today, atter is commonly associated with the Norse mythology, where it plays an important role in various contexts – see subsequent section: § In Norse mythology. In Eddic poetry, both the sea serpent Jörmungandr, and the dwarf Fáfnir in dragon-hamr, are described as having attery breath. A similar creature from later Orcadian folklore is the attery stoor worm which was killed by the hero Assipattle, falling into the sea and forming Iceland, Orkney, Shetland and the Faroe Islands. As in the English tale of the Linton worm, the stoor worm is killed by burning its insides with peat.

== Etymology ==
Atter is derived from Old English: āttor, ātor and ǣttor, which in turn derives from West Germanic languages: aitr, which stems from a Proto-Germanic: *aitrą, (Note: An asterisk (*-) before a word means it is a reconstruction of an unrecorded word assumed to have existed, based around various metrics.) meaning "poison, pus", ultimately stemming from a Proto-Indo-European root of "to swell; swelling, tumour, abscess", related to Ancient Greek: οἶδος (oîdos), "swelling, tumour, abscess, produced by internal action". It is directly cognate with Old Norse: eitr and its derivatives, Icelandic: eitur, Norwegian: eiter, Swedish: etter, Danish: edder, as well as German: Eiter and Dutch: etter, all with similar meaning. In Scots, the cognate terms are atter and etter, variously meaning "poison", "purulent matter from a sore" and "quarrelsomeness".

While mostly archaic or archaized in English, the word lives on with some strength in other languages. The Icelandic form eitur is the common word for "poison", while the Swedish form etter is a word for “venom”, as well as the full poetic meaning in dialectal and archaized language. The German form Eiter and the Dutch form etter are the common word for “pus”.

Its derivative, attery means "venomous", "poisonous" or "bitter". It is also found in compound nouns such as the now dialectal term for a spider attercop, literally "atter-top" or "atter-cup" (compare cobweb, previously (atter)copweb), cognate with Norwegian and Danish: edderkop, and Swedish: etterkoppa. It is also found in the term atterlothe, meaning "an antidote to poison".

== Atter breathing dragons ==
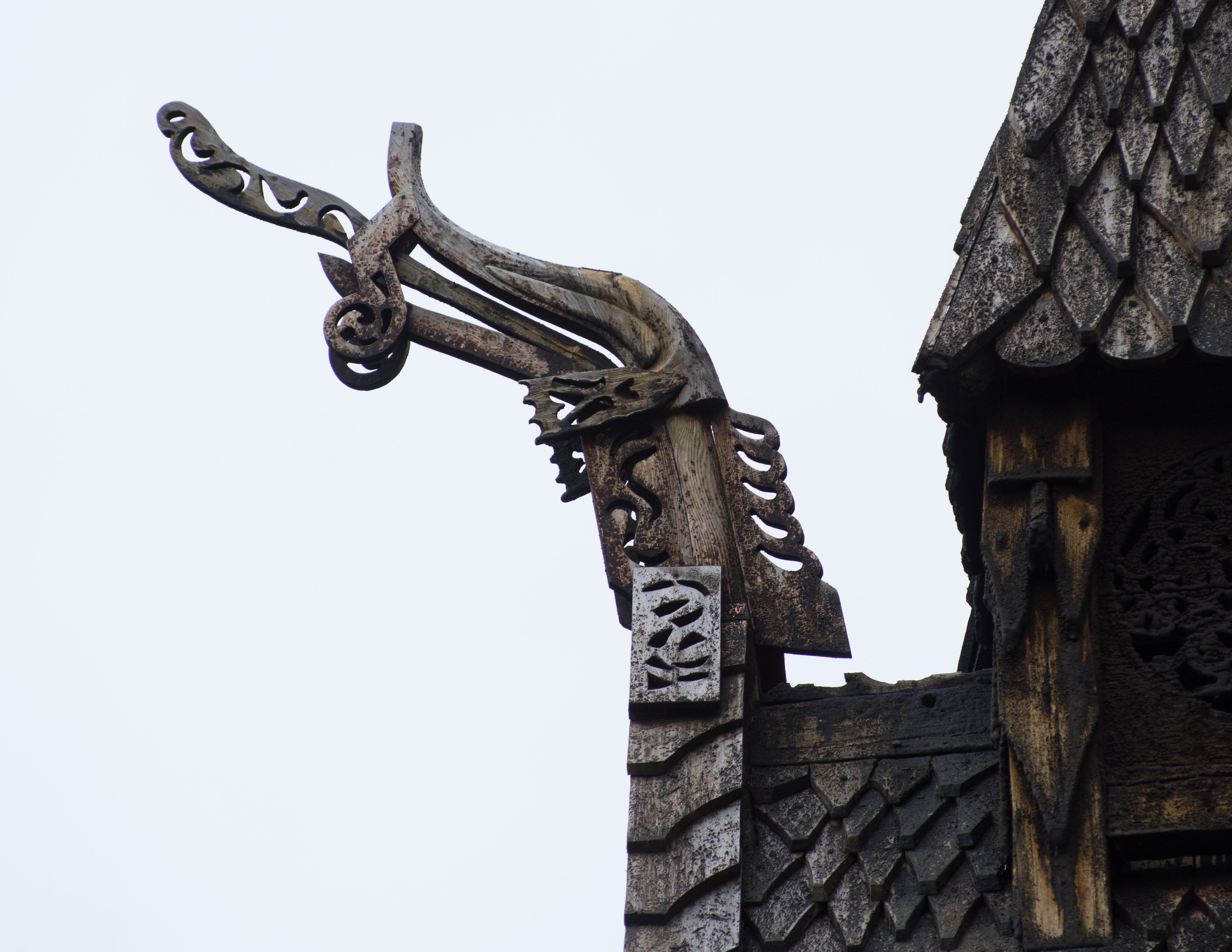
One of the four dragon heads adorning the ridges of the Borgund Stave Church, possibly depicted breathing atter

Germanic dragons with poisonous breath, or rather, breathing atter, are believed to predate those who breathe fire in Germanic folklore and literature, consistent with the theory that Germanic dragons developed from traditions regarding wild snakes, some of whom produce venom. The Nine Herbs Charm describes nine plants being used to overcome the venom of a slithering wyrm. It tells that Wōden (Odin) defeats the wyrm by striking it with nine twigs, breaking it into nine pieces.

In Eddic poetry, both the sea serpent Jörmungandr, and the dwarf Fáfnir in dragon-hamr, are described as having attery breath. A similar creature from later Orcadian folklore is the attery stoor worm which was killed by the hero Assipattle, falling into the sea and forming Iceland, Orkney, Shetland and the Faroe Islands. As in the English tale of the Linton worm, the stoor worm is killed by burning its insides with peat.

Beowulf is one of the earliest examples of a fire-breathing dragon, yet it is also referred to as Old English: attorsceaðan, lit. 'the atter scathe' (infinitive) or 'the atter scather'. After burning homes and land in Geatland, it fights the eponymous hero of the poem who bears a metal shield to protect himself from the fire. The dragon wounds him but is slain by the king's thane Wiglaf. Beowulf later succumbs to the dragon's atter and dies. The other dragon mentioned in the poem is further associated with fire, melting from its own heat once slain by Sigmund. Both fire and atter are also spat by dragons in the Chivalric saga Sigurðr saga þögla and in Nikolaus saga erkibiskups II, written around 1340, in which the dragon is sent by God to teach an English deacon to become more pious.

== In Norse mythology ==
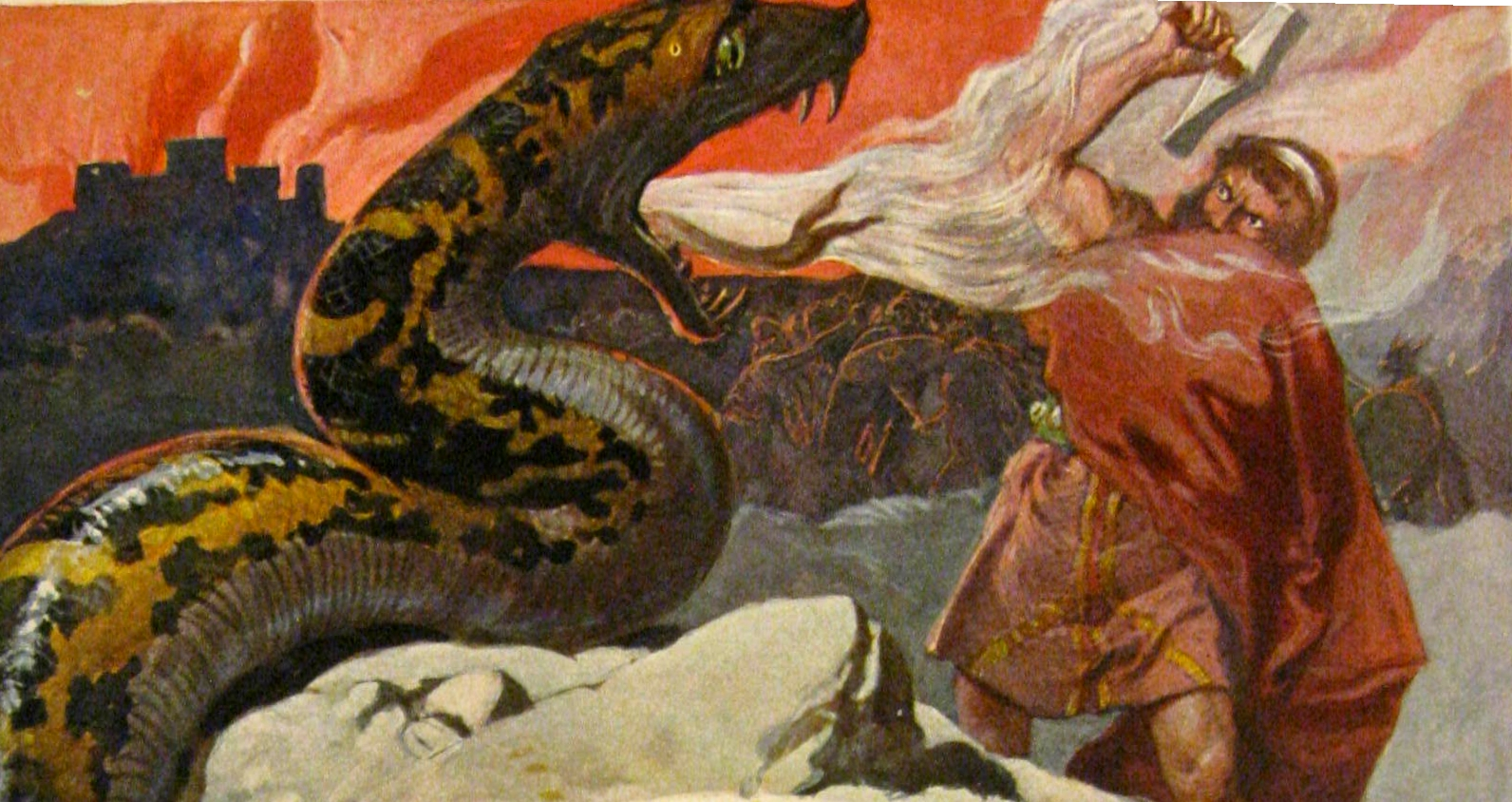
Jörmungandr blowing atter on Thor during Ragnarök, fatally poisoning him. Painting by Emil Doepler, 1905.

In Norse mythology, atter (Old Norse: eitr) plays an important role in various contexts. In one instance in Gylfaginning, atter is dripped on Loki by a snake placed above him by Skaði. In another, it is blown by the worm Jörmungandr during Ragnarök, leading to the death of Thor. Also in Gylfaginning, atter is described as forming in Ginnungagap, which gave rise to the primordial being Ymir, as described by the jötunn Vafþrúðnir in Vafþrúðnismál:

Old Norse text	Bellows translation
Ór Élivágum stukku eitrdropar, svá óx, unz varð jötunn; þar eru órar ættir komnar allar saman; því er þat æ allt til atalt.	Down from Elivagar did atter drop, And waxed till a giant it was; And thence arose our giants' race, And thus so fierce are we found.

== See also ==
- Germanic dragon

== Bibliography ==
=== Primary ===
- Bellows, Henry Adam (2004). The poetic Edda: the mythological poems. Mineola, NY: Dover Publications. ISBN 9780486437101.
- Sturluson, Snorri (2018). The Prose Edda. Translated by Brodeur, Arthur Gilchrist. Franklin Classics Trade Press. ISBN 9780344335013.
- "Gylfaginning (Old Norse)". heimskringla.no.
- "Vafþrúðnismál (Old Norse)". heimskringla.com.
- "attery". OED.
- "atterlothe". OED.
- "atter/etter". Dictionary of the Scots language.
- "attercop". OED.
- "edderkopp". ordbøkene.
- "edderkop". Den Danske Ordbog.

=== Secondary ===
- Simek, Rudolf (2008). A Dictionary of Northern Mythology. Translated by Hall, Angela. BOYE6. ISBN 9780859915137.
