= Stoor =

Stoor may refer to:

- Stoor worm, or Mester Stoor Worm, was a gigantic evil sea serpent of Orcadian folklore
- Stoor (Hobbit), a Middle-earth Hobbit. See Hobbit#Divisions
- Fredrik Stoor (born 1984), a Swedish former professional footballer
