= Lyminster =

Village in West Sussex, England

Coordinates: 50.833°N 0.546°W

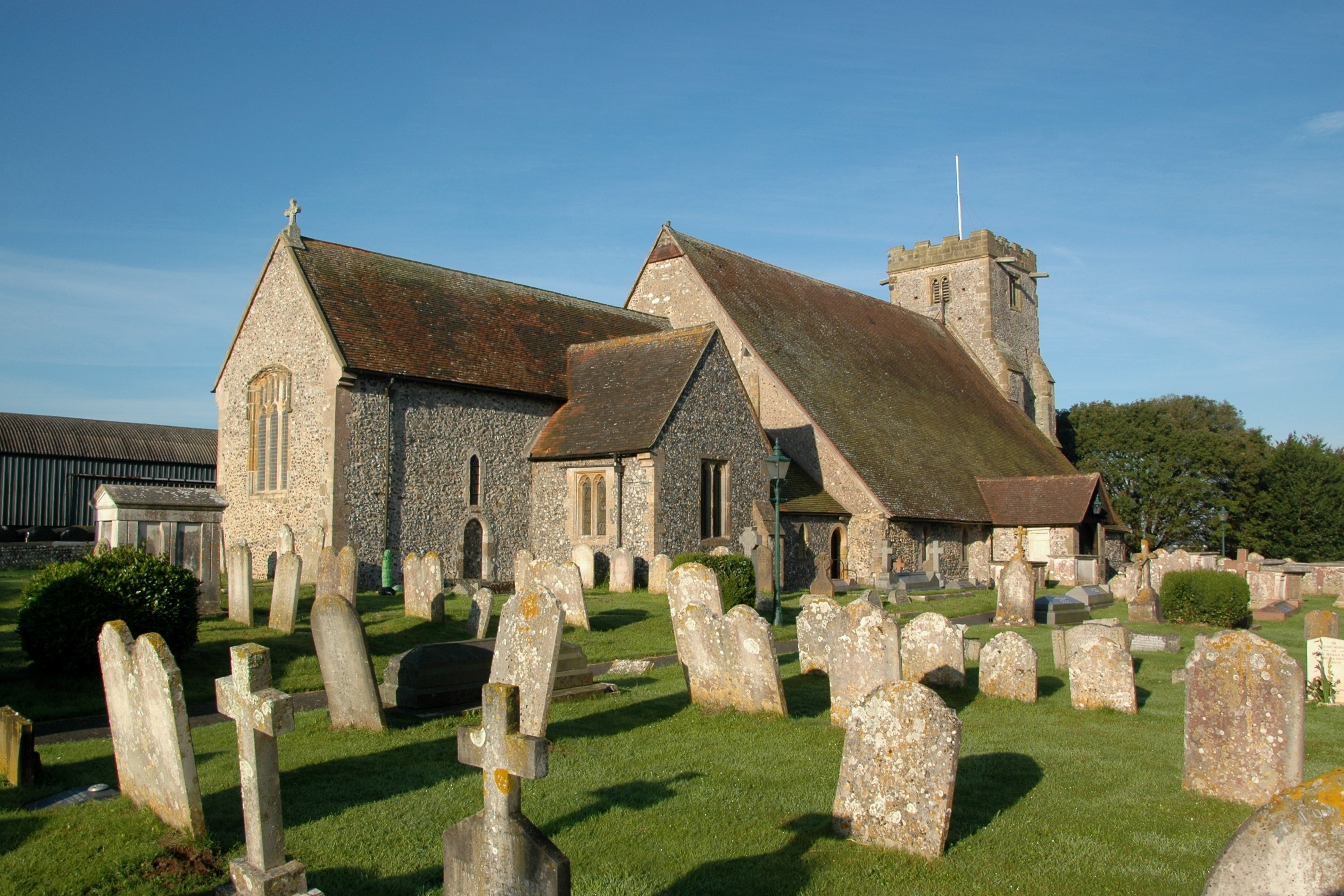
- St Mary Magdalene parish church

- Location within West Sussex
- Area: 5.87 km^{2} (2.27 sq mi)
- Population: 369 (2011 Census)
  - Density: 60/km^{2} (160/sq mi)
- OS grid reference: TQ025047
  - London: 50 miles (80 km) NNE
- Civil parish: Lyminster and Crossbush
- District: Arun
- Shire county: West Sussex
- Region: South East
- Country: England
- Sovereign state: United Kingdom
- Post town: Littlehampton
- Postcode district: BN17
- Dialling code: 01903
- Police: Sussex
- Fire: West Sussex
- Ambulance: South East Coast
- UK Parliament: Arundel and South Downs
- Website: Lyminster and Crossbush Parish Council

Lyminster is a village that is the main settlement of Lyminster and Crossbush civil parish, in the Arun District of West Sussex, England. It borders, to the south, Littlehampton, which has its town centre 2 miles (3 km) away.

== Landmarks ==
=== Church ===
The Church of England parish church of St Mary Magdalene is an 11th-century Saxon building and a Grade I listed building, the highest grading in the national system.

Bells

The church has a ring of six bells. Lester and Pack of the Whitechapel Bell Foundry cast the treble, second and fourth bells in 1759. John Warner and Sons of Cripplegate, London cast the third and fifth bells in 1887, the year of the Golden Jubilee of Queen Victoria. Mears and Stainbank of the Whitechapel Bell Foundry cast the tenor bell in 1950.

== History ==
According to the Hagiography of the Secgan Manuscript the village is the burial place of Saint Cuthflæd of Lyminster.

== Folklore ==
Just to the north of the village is a knuckerhole which, according to folklore, was home to a dragon, the Knucker.The church contains a tombstone called the Slayer's Slab, supposed to be from the tomb of the dragonslayer.

== Sources and further reading ==
- Nairn, Ian; Pevsner, Nikolaus (1965). Sussex. The Buildings of England. Harmondsworth: Penguin Books. pp. 267–268. ISBN 0-14-071028-0.
- Page, William, ed. (1973). A History of the County of Sussex. Victoria County History. Vol. 2. p. 121.
