= Slayer's Slab =

Medieval gravestone

Coordinates: 50°50′00″N 0°32′56″W

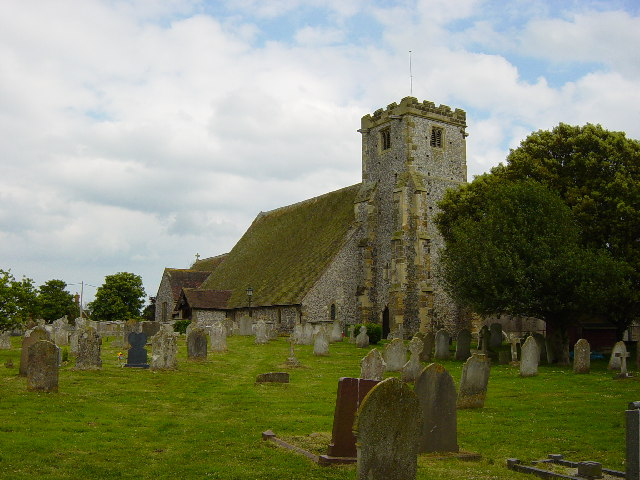
Lyminster church

The Slayer's Slab is a title given to a medieval gravestone formerly in the graveyard of Lyminster church in West Sussex, England. It has now been moved inside the church to protect it from weathering. According to legend it is the gravestone of the dragonslayer who killed the Knucker who lived in the nearby knuckerhole. The stone has a cross on it overlaying a herringbone pattern, but no inscription to identify the tomb's occupant.
