= Runic animal =

Decorative animal figures on runic inscriptions

Runestone U 871 with several runic animals pictured on the same rock (runic dragons in red, runic serpent in white), which are bound together.

Runic animals (Swedish: rundjur) are the decorative animal figures on runic inscriptions, especially on runestones, which belong to Germanic animal ornamentation and the like. These figures traditionally take the shape of slender serpentine creatures, such as serpents, dragons and other beasts, and usually form the runic bands on which the inscription is affixed by framing the runes with their silhouette so that the inscription band and the runic animal's body are one.

They are traditionally carved in meandering loops together with elements that attach them to the writing, for example through so-called binding, which means that one or more runic animals are chained or intertwined with themselves or each other to form ring patterns.

== Typology ==
Swedish archeologist Anne-Sofie Gräslund established and dated a stylistic typology for the ornamentation of runestones during the 1990s. Her system was a breakthrough and has now become widely accepted.

Gräslund established among other that the older runic animals mainly consisted of snakes and serpents (serpent bands), while later types replaced the serpents with dragons or potentially lindworms (dragon bands).

== See also ==
- Runology
