= Knucker =

Legendary water dragon of Sussex, England

Nicor
Creature information
- Grouping: Mythological creature Water dragon

Origin
- First attested: In folklore
- Country: England
- Region: Sussex
- Details: Deep pools of water called knuckerholes

Knucker is a dialect word for a sort of water dragon, living in knuckerholes in Sussex, England. The word comes from the Old English nicor which means "water monster" and is used in the poem Beowulf. It may also be related to the word "nixie", which is a form of water spirit, to "Old Nick", a euphemism for the devil, or to the words "Nykur" (Icelandic water horse), "Nickel" (German goblin), "Knocker" (Cornish goblin), "Näcken" and "Neck" (Scandinavian water men and water spirits), "Näkineiu" and "Näkk" (Estonian mermaid and singing water animal), and "Näkki" (Finnish water spirit)."

== Appearance ==
The knucker is said to have wings, and is sometimes described as a sea serpent. The knucker has "a giant, slithering sea serpent's body, and cold, bold sea serpent's eyes and a deadly, hissing sea serpent's mouth".

== In folklore ==
The most famous knucker lived, according to legend, at Lyminster. The knucker apparently caused a lot of trouble, consuming local livestock and even villagers, and so it was decided to slay the monster. A number of different legends recount how this was done.

One version has the dragon slain by a knight-errant after the king of Sussex offered his daughter's hand in marriage to whoever rid them of the beast. Legend says that after marrying the princess, the knight settled in Lyminster and his gravestone, the Slayer's Slab, can be seen in Lyminster church.

An alternative legend has the dragon outwitted by a local farmer's boy, called Jim Pulk or Jim Puttock, said in some versions to be from Wick, after the Mayor of Arundel offered a reward. He killed the dragon by cooking it a giant poisoned pie, which he took to the knuckerhole on a horse and cart. The dragon ate up pie, horse and cart. When it had expired the boy returned and cut off its head. In some versions he then dies himself, probably of the same poison he used on the dragon, though this is possibly a later addition designed to explain the Slayer's Slab.

It was believed that knuckers could be found at knuckerholes in various places in Sussex, including Binsted, Lyminster, Lancing, Shoreham and Worthing. A knucker hole is a very deep round pool, which is considered to be infinitely deep. However, even though the knucker hole in Lyminster is only thirty feet (9.1 m) deep, a local legend says that the villagers tied together the six bellropes from the church tower and lowered them into the pool, but they could not reach the bottom.
