= Worm of Linton =

Scottish mythical beast

The Linton Worm is a mythical beast referred to in a Scottish Borders legend dating back to the 12th century. "Wyrm" is the Old English for serpent. A 12th-century writer believed it to be "In length three Scots yards and bigger than an ordinary man’s leg – in form and callour to our common muir edders." The myth is similar to that of the Lambton Worm.

== Legend ==
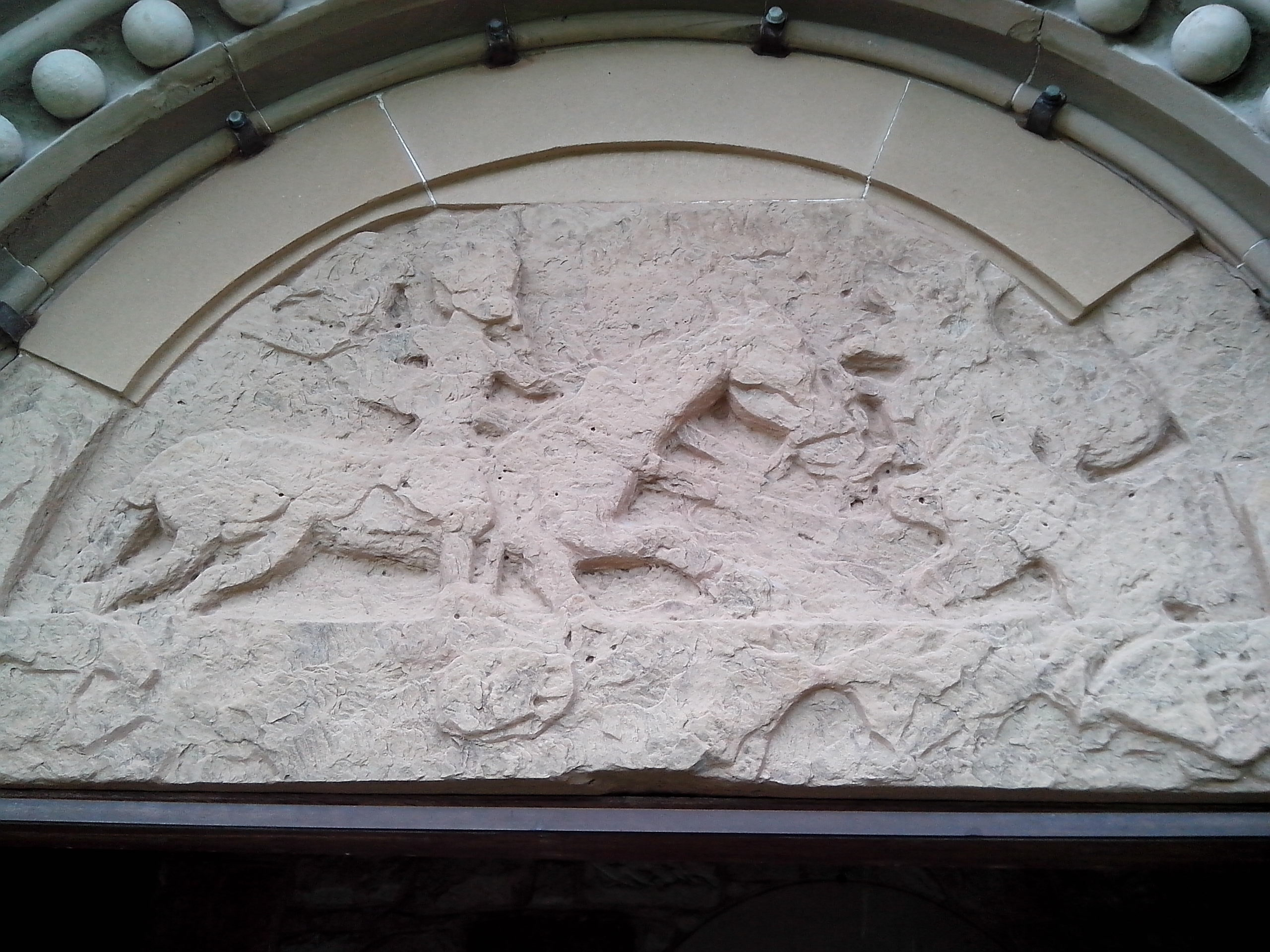
Mediaeval stone carving above the door of Linton church. Said by tradition to celebrate the heroism of de Somerville, it shows a knight on horseback apparently confronting two large quadruped animals.

The monster lived in a hollow on the northeast side of Linton Hill, a spot still known as the "Worm’s Den", at Linton in Roxburghshire on the Scottish borders. Emerging from its lair at dusk and dawn to ravage the countryside, eating crops, livestock and people, it proved invulnerable to the weapons ranged against it. The surrounding area became ruined by the beast's predations.

The news reached the ears of one John de Somerville, the Laird of Lariston and a man of reckless courage, who was in the south at that time. He travelled to the nearby village of Jedburgh and heard the lurid tales of the locals. Observing the beast himself he saw that the creature would open its mouth wide to swallow anything in its path but when faced with something too large to eat would remain still, with its mouth open. Sensing an opportunity he went to a local blacksmith and had him forge an iron covered spear with wheel at its tip which could impale a hunk of peat tipped in tar and brimstone. He practised riding with the burning spear to accustom his horse to the smoke.

De Somerville approached the worm's hideout with his servant at dawn. He knew that sitting on his horse he would prove too large for the creature to swallow. As if at a joust he attacked it, plunging his burning lance into the monster's gaping mouth and down its throat, mortally wounding it. The Orcadian folklorist Ernest Marwick highlights the similarity between the method used to kill the Linton worm and those recounted in the slaying of the Stoor worm of Orkney, which was also killed with burning peat.

The writhing death throes of the Linton Worm supposedly created the curious topography of the hills of the region, an area that came to be known as "wormington". The animal retreated to its lair to die, its thrashing tail bringing down the mountain around it and burying it forever. The legend states that de Somerville's heroism was memorialised by a carved stone at Linton Kirk. He was made Royal Falconer, knighted and made "First Barrone" of Linton. The crest of the Somervilles was a wyvern (heraldic dragon) perched on a wheel.

== See also ==
- The Lambton Worm – a similar myth from NE England
- The Laidly Worm of Spindleston Heugh
- Sockburn Worm
