= Assipattle and the Stoor Worm =

Orcadian folktale

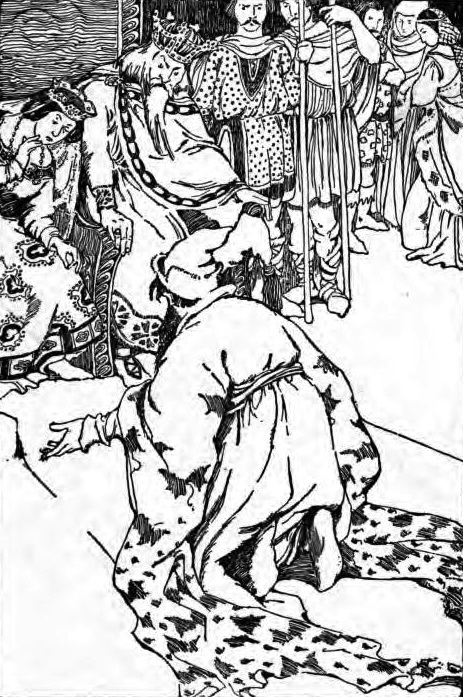
Unless a solution could be found the Princess would have to be sacrificed to the monster serpent.

Assipattle and the Stoor Worm is an Orcadian folktale relating the battle between the eponymous hero and a gigantic sea serpent known as the stoor worm. The tale was preserved by 19th-century antiquarian Walter Traill Dennison, and retold by another Orcadian folklorist, Ernest Marwick, in a 20th-century version that integrates Dennison's texts with tidbits from other oral storytellers.

== Synopsis ==
The seventh son of a goodman, (Note: Goodman is an obsolete term predominantly used in Scotland to describe the "male head of a household".) Assipattle and his family live on their father's farm, which is nestled in a valley under the hillsides of Leegarth. A lazy daydreamer, Assipattle is scorned by his older brothers and his parents but his sister, who he is greatly attached to, is more tolerant of his idle musing and slothful ways. Often neglected and usually dressed in the tattered hand-me down clothes from his brothers, his days are spent carrying out menial tasks but he would rather avoid work as much as possible. Frequently teased by his brothers, he habitually sprawls among the ashes at the fireside in the evenings, narrating tales featuring himself as a hero victorious in all battles.

Assipattle's loneliness increases when his sister leaves home to serve as a maid for Princess Gem-de-lovely, the only daughter of the king, and his sole heir. Within a short time, the country is in turmoil as the evil stoor worm has arrived in the kingdom. A gigantic vile sea serpent, it is capable of destroying entire villages; the king is advised by a sorcerer that the only way to appease the monster is by feeding it seven virgins each Saturday. The citizens are outraged as their daughters are eaten by the stoor worm and insist the king finds an alternative solution. After seeking further advice, the king is told the only way to make the monster leave is to sacrifice the Princess; he is allowed time to find someone to slay the monster before she is sacrificed. However, one of his nobles demands that if the Princess is sacrificed and the sea monster still does not leave, then the sorcerer shall be its next victim, and the king's court agree with him.

In a desperate attempt to save Princess Gem-de-lovely, who was loved by everyone except her evil step-mother, the king despatches messengers to let everyone know he will give his kingdom, the magical sword Sickersnapper that he had inherited from Odin and the princess's hand in marriage to anyone who can defeat the stoor worm. A messenger arrives at Leegarth, conveys the news to the family and Assipattle declares he will trounce the beast, drawing mocking responses from his father and brothers.

Prospective heroes arrived but all shied away from the challenge when they saw the monster. The king is despondent on the night before the princess is due to be offered to the stoor worm and instructs his servant to ready a boat as he intends to fight the monster himself using the magic sword. Meanwhile, at Leegarth, the family were making plans to watch the demise of the princess; Assipattle was to remain at home but his parents were going to ride on his father's horse, Teetgong, which had the reputation of being the speediest horse in the kingdom, to attend the spectacle.

Assipattle overheard his parents discussing the instructions necessary for Teetgong to attain his full speed and once his parents were asleep, he crept to Teetgong's stable, mounted the horse and headed to the shore, arriving just as the sun began to rise. After stealing some hot peat from an elderly woman's cottage, he tricks the man guarding the king's boat into coming ashore and takes the boat. The stoor worm is just beginning to awaken and as it opens its mouth to yawn, the boat is carried down to the depths of the creature's stomach until it finally comes to rest. Assipattle plunges the still burning peat into the stoor worm's liver, starting a furnace-like blaze. The pain of its burning liver causes the creature to have a fit of retching that carries Assipattle, who has managed to return to his boat, back out of the monster's mouth.

A crowd had gathered on the beach, and Assipattle lands safely among them. The ferocity of the fire burning in the creature's liver increases, causing smoke clouds to be expelled from its mouth and nostrils, turning the skies black. The islanders, believing that the world is about to end, clamber up a hillside to watch the final death throes of the creature at a safe distance from the resulting tidal waves and earthquakes. As it dies, the creature's teeth fall out to become the islands of Orkney, Shetland and the Faroes. The Baltic Sea is created where its tongue falls out, and when the creature finally curls up into a tight knot and dies, its body becomes Iceland.

The king is rapturous the princess has been saved and gives Assipattle the magic sword before the conquering hero and the princess head back to the palace on Teetgong. Assipattle's sister runs out of the palace to greet them and whispers that the queen and the sorcerer were having an affair but had already left. Assipattle chased after the pair on Teetgong, killing the wise man with Sickersnapper and the queen was incarcerated in a tower for the rest of her life. True to his word, the king allowed Assipattle to have the kingdom and marry the princess. The festivities lasted for nine weeks and the couple lived happily ever after. The tale finishes with the sentence: "And, if not dead, they are yet alive." (Note: This is the anglicised version of the sentence; Traill Dennison notes it is frequently used to end a tale and in local dialect would read: "An' gin no' deed, dei'r livin' yet.")

== Etymology ==
According to folklorists Jennifer Westwood and Sophia Kingshill, the name Assipattle translates as Ash-paddle, very similar to Askeladd (Ash-Lad), a character in Norwegian folk stories. The Sanday folklorist Walter Traill Dennison, who transcribed the tales, defines Ass as the local dialect for ashes and to pattle as similar to the up and down flailing movements a fish makes with its tail while attempting to escape if floundering at the water's edge. Tom Muir, an Orkney folklorist and author, translates Assipattle as "a person who rakes through the ashes". Other spelling variants, Ashiepattle, Aessi-pattle or Assie pattle, share a common definition of a Cinderella type figure, an unkempt, idle and uncared for child who spends a large amount of time huddled at the fireside and may be evolved from Old Norse.

The name given to the magic sword, Sickersnapper, is defined by Traill Dennison as likely to mean severe biter; he adds further explanation that sicker equates to severe in an Orcadian dialect as opposed to meaning secure, the usage in the Scots language.

== Genre ==
According to folklore researcher Jacqueline Simpson the story of "Assipattle and the Stoor Worm" is classified as a dragon-slayer tale. She describes it as "almost pure märchen in style and content, apart from the local aetiologies"; (Note: Märchen is a German term used by some folklorists to describe "wonder tales".) folklorist E. S. Hartland stated it was "a purely Norse tale", demonstrating the triumph of bravery over adversity. Briggs also classifies it as a dragon tale describing the difference in size compared to the much smaller St George's dragon. Assipattle is the male counterpart of the Cinderella (Cinder-girl) stories, but is older and may be indicative of eras when inheritance was via daughters as opposed to sons. Hartland and an anonymous reviewer in the Saturday Review placed it as an Hesione tale.

== Textual sources ==
Traill Dennison recalled that when he was a child simple Orkney storytellers recited many variations of the tale. Two of his renditions were published: a shorter treatment in standard English serialised in The Scottish Antiquary magazine in 1891, (Note: See. The spelling of the monster's name was incorrectly given throughout as Stove Worm, which was noted in the next volume.) and the full tale, sprinkled with many local terms annotated by Dennison, was reprinted complete with his notes in Douglas's Scottish Fairy and Folk Tales published in about 1893, (Note: Marwick quotes c. 1893; the re-print in 1977 states: "First published by Walter Scott Ltd, London, 1896".) and taken from a Traill Dennison manuscript.

Marwick's 20th-century version is a composite, in his own words the "retelling of one of Orkney's best folk-tales", based primarily on the two texts recorded by Traill Dennison, and drawing from "the memories of the late J. Fotheringhame and other Sanday informants." Sir George Dasent also gave a version of the story but Assipattle was named Boots, which caused exasperation among Orcadians when they learnt of it. The Herald's anonymous reviewer describes the story as "Perhaps the most valuable contribution" in the book adding it is "delightful" and a "remarkably fine tale". Writing in the journal Folklore Hartland felt it was the "most important" of the tales taken from unpublished manuscripts.
