= Stoor worm =

Sea serpent of Orcadian folklore

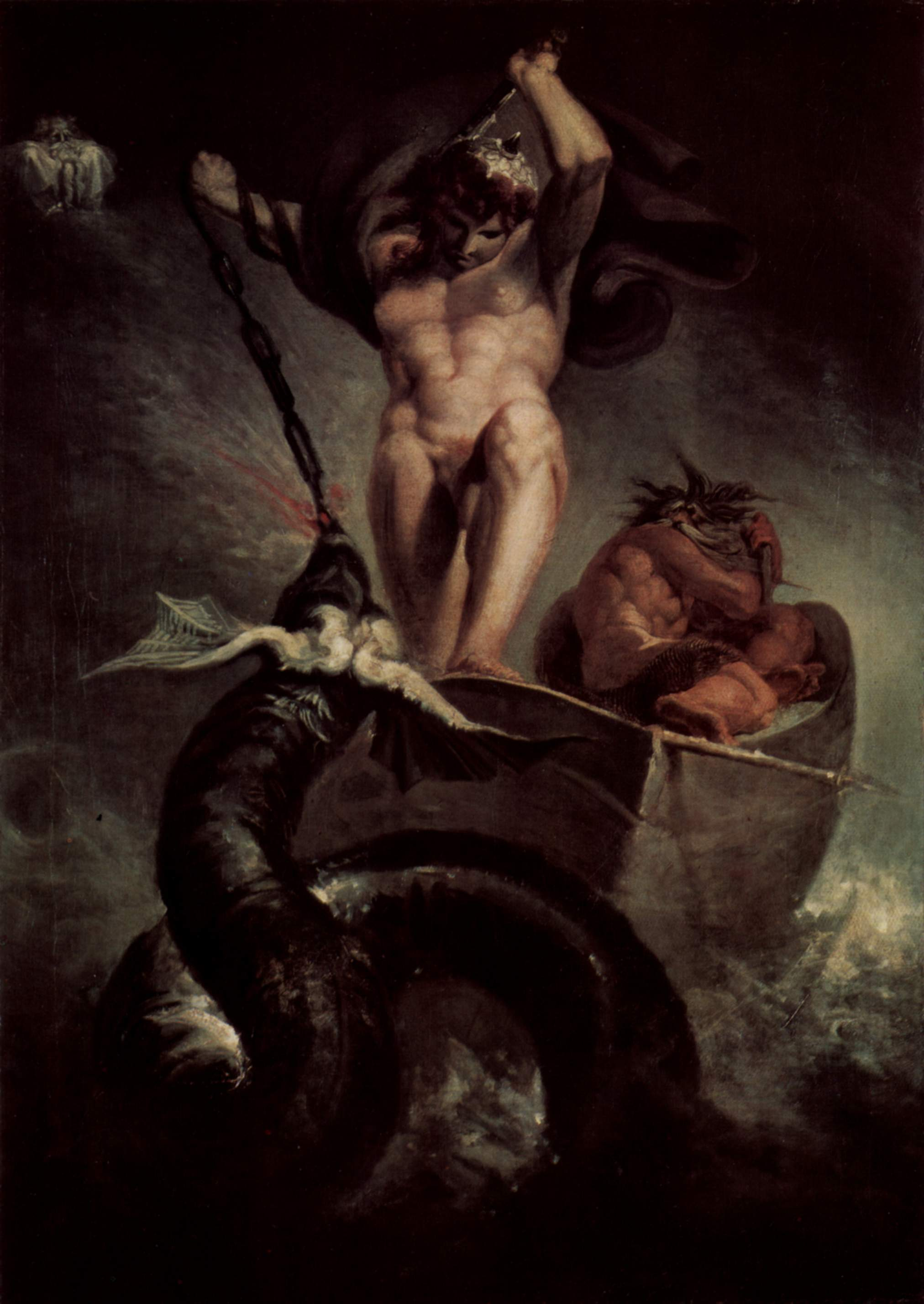
Thor in Hymir's boat battling the Midgard Serpent, by Henry Fuseli (1788)

The stoor worm, or Mester Stoor Worm, was a gigantic evil sea serpent of Orcadian folklore, capable of contaminating plants and destroying animals and humans with its putrid breath. It is probably an Orkney variant of the Norse Jörmungandr, also known as the Midgard Serpent, or world serpent, and has been described as a sea dragon.

The king of one country threatened by the beast's arrival was advised to offer it a weekly sacrifice of seven virgins. In desperation, the king eventually issued a proclamation offering his kingdom, his daughter's hand in marriage, and a magic sword to anyone who could destroy the monster. Assipattle, the youngest son of a local farmer, defeated the creature; as it died its teeth fell out to become the islands of Orkney, Shetland and the Faroes, and its body became Iceland.

Similarities between Assipatle's defeat of the monster and other dragon-slayer tales, including Herakles' destruction of a sea monster to save Hesione, have been noted by several authors. It has been suggested that tales of this genre evolved during a period of enlightenment when human sacrifices to bestial divinities were beginning to be suppressed.

== Etymology ==
The name stoor worm may be derived from the Old Norse Storðar-gandr, an alternative name for Jörmungandr, the world or Midgard Serpent of Norse mythology, Stoor or stour was a term used by Scots in the latter part of the 14th century to describe fighting or battles; it could also be applied to "violent conflicts" of the weather elements. Similar definitions are given by the Dictionary of the Older Scottish Tongue that covers the period up to the start of the 18th century; later volumes, when it was published as the Dictionary of the Scots Language and covered from 1700 onwards, include substantial, large and big; it further indicates it may be akin to the Old Norse stórr. It shows stoorworm as "a monster serpent, a sea-dragon" using Traill Dennison's tale as the basis for the definition.

Mester means master; it may have been deemed Mester Stoor Worm because it was the "master and father of all stoorworms". In Scotland worm may frequently be applied to a dragon, as it is in northern England according to folklorist Katharine Briggs, a usage that derives from the Saxon and Norse terms (see Germanic dragon). The spelling of the Old English and obsolete variant of the word worm is wyrm, meaning dragon or serpent. Traill Dennison's definition gives mester as "superior" with stoor being "large, powerful, strong or stern". He describes worm as "any animal of serpent shape".

== Folk beliefs ==
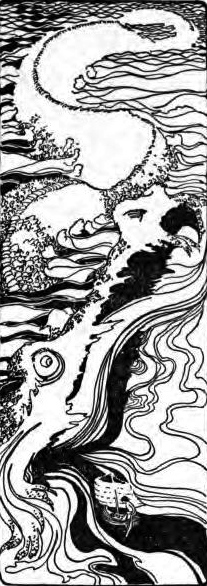
Stoor worm as portrayed by Maud Hunt Squire (1873–1954)

=== Description and common attributes ===
An inhabitant of the sea, the stoor worm was a mythical serpent-like creature created by malevolent spirits. A gigantic beast with a ferocious appetite, it was able to demolish ships and houses with its prehensile forked tongue it used as a pair of tongs, and even to drag entire hillsides and villages into the sea. Its eyes were like "round lochs, very deep and dark" in the modern retelling, whereas it "glowed and flamed like a ward fire" in Dennison's long text, which noted in an aside that some accounts stated that the stoor worm had only one eye.

According to folklorist Jennifer Westwood, the stoor worm's head was "like a great mountain"; its breath was putrid, contaminating plants and destroying any humans or animals with its blast. Traill Dennison reported the serpent's length was "beyond telling, and reached thousands and thousands of miles in the sea". Giant sea swells and earthquakes were attributed to the beast yawning, a sign it wanted to be fed rather than of fatigue. Islanders were terrified of the serpent; it was described by Traill Dennison, who transcribed its story, as "the worst of the nine fearful curses that plague mankind". A further tale recorded by Traill Dennison gives a brief mention of another stoor worm, described as the progeny of the Orcadian monster, which is killed when it is severed in two by an oversized mythical ship.

=== Sacrificial offerings ===
The king of one country threatened by the imminent arrival of the stoor worm sought the advice of a wise man or spaeman, (Note: Spaeman or spayman is the terminology used by Traill Dennison in his original transcription, an archaic Scottish term for soothsayer.) who suggests that the beast might be appeased if it is fed seven virgins every week. In line with the wise man's advice, every Saturday the islanders provide a sacrificial offering of seven virgins, who were tied up and placed on the beach for the serpent to sweep into its mouth as it reared its head from the sea.

As the regular sacrifices continue the islanders approach the king for help, as they are worried there will soon be no young girls left. The king again asks the advice of the spaeman, who tentatively suggests that the king's only daughter, Princess Gem-de-lovely, his most prized possession, will have to be offered to the stoor worm to encourage it to leave. During the ten-week period of grace before the princess has to be sacrificed, messengers are despatched to every corner of the realm offering the kingdom, marriage to the princess, and the magic sword the king had inherited from the god Odin.

=== Slaying ===
The number of prospective heroes who come forward as a result of the king's appeal varies in the telling from 30 to 36, but they all leave without confronting the monster. The day before the princess is due to be sacrificed, Assipattle, the youngest son of a local farmer and despised by his family, mounts his father's horse and at dawn arrives on the beach where the creature is just beginning to awaken. After stealing some hot peat and acquiring a small boat, Assipattle is driven by the waves into the stoor worm's mouth as it starts yawning. The boat is carried down to the depths of the creature's stomach until it finally comes to rest. Assipattle plunges the still burning peat into the stoor worm's liver, causing a "fire that blazed like a furnace". The pain of its burning liver causes the creature to have a fit of retching that carries Assipattle, who has managed to return to his boat, back out of the monster's mouth.

The commotion caused by the stoor worm's writhing agonies draws a crowd to the beach, and Assipattle lands safely among them. The ferocity of the fire burning in the creature's liver increases, causing smoke clouds to be expelled from its mouth and nostrils, turning the skies black. The islanders, believing that the world is about to end, clamber up a hillside to watch the final death throes of the creature at a safe distance from the resulting tidal waves and earthquakes. As it dies, the creature's teeth fall out to become the islands of Orkney, Shetland and the Faroes. The Baltic Sea is created where its tongue falls out, and when the creature finally curls up into a tight knot and dies, its body becomes Iceland. True to his word, once the skies clear and the earth settles, the king relinquishes his kingdom to Assipattle, who marries Princess Gem-de-lovely. As promised, the king also gives Odin's magic sword to Assipattle.

== Origins ==
The stoor worm is likely to be an Orkney variant of the Norse Jörmungandr, or world serpent, also known as the Midgard Serpent. The Orcadian folklorist Marwick highlights the similarity between the method Assipattle used to kill the mythical creature and those recounted in the slaying of the Worm of Linton and the Cnoc na Cnoimh of Sutherland tales. He also notes that in Bel and the Dragon, the dragon is killed by Daniel using "fat and hair" instead of peat. In Shetland there was a long-standing belief that "away, far out to sea, near the edge of the world, lived a monstrous sea-serpent that took about six hours to draw in his breath, and six hours to let it out", which Marwick speculates was probably an explanation for the cycle of the tides.

Hartland published an analysis of the myths of the Perseus cycle in the last decade of the 19th century with the stated aim to determine "whether it be possible to ascertain what was its primitive form, where it originated, and how it became diffused over the Eastern continent." He highlighted similarities between Assipattle's defeat of the stoor worm and Herakle's rescue of Hesione. When researching the Dartmoor legend of Childe's Tomb folklorist Theo Brown also drew comparisons between the slaying of the stoor worm and Jonah's three-day confinement inside a whale. Hartland concluded that tales of this genre were confined to countries beginning to move away from primitive beliefs and possibly evolved "out of the suppression of human sacrifices to divinities in bestial form."
