= Hamr (folklore) =

Shapeshifting and out-of-body manifestations in Nordic folklore

Kim Diaz Holm's contemporary art depicting a draugr (revenant) haunting in enormous hamr

In Nordic mythology and folklore, Old Norse: hamr (Danish: ham; Faroese: hamur; Icelandic: hamur; Norwegian: ham; Swedish: hamn) is a magical shape or figure in which the mind or spirit (hug, Old Norse: hugr) could manifest itself outside the body during a dream or an ecstasy. It is a type of magical shapeshifting used for disguise or some undertaking.

The word also exists in English as hame and heam, from Old English: hama, meaning "shroud, casing, covering, skin, membrane".

== Etymology ==
The root word stems from a Proto-Indo-European root for "covering", related to "chamber" and German: hemd ("shirt"). The Swedish Academy gives the full Swedish sense as:

1) (†) amniotic sac (compare 'foal hamr', "amniotic sac of a foal"); 2) (†) about skin that covers a body; 3) shape, form, figure; especially, in terms of root perception, about the external form that is thought of as a covering around the soul, especially about animal form that humans or gods were sometimes thought to assume; also figuratively; nowadays almost only in the expression shift or change hamr, in the presentation of root perception, also (now only in a vulgar style, rarely used) in the extended sense, about the external costume in which someone appears, costume, clothing, covering, garb; often in terms of disguise or dressing up (compare: animal-, bear-, eagle-, falcon-, hawk-, female-, human-, servant-, troll-, among more). 4) (now especially in the vulgar style) about a deceased spirit, ghost, "shadow" (though without the connotation of something dark). 5) (in the vernacular) in extended sense, about a person (who has something supernatural or spiritual in their appearance): figure, form, "apparition".

Descendants of Old Norse: hamr include:

- Danish: ham – stripped skin, feather shroud, guise; bladder (compare amniotic sac)
- Danish: hams – shell, sleeve
- Faroese: hamur
- Icelandic: hamur – (an animal's) outer covering; guardian spirit, fylgja
- Norwegian: ham – shroud, dress, coat, skin, guise, spirit
- Old Swedish: hamber
  - Swedish: hamm, ham
- Old Norse: hǫfn (partial doublet of Old Norse: hamr) – dress, coat, cape, cloak; fetus (compare amniotic sac)
  - Icelandic: höfn – dress, coat, cape, cloak
  - Old Swedish: hampn (doublet of Old Swedish: hamber)
    - Swedish: hamn (primary form, double of Swedish: hamm, ham)

Cognates of Old Norse: hamr includes:

- Old English: hama – dress, coat, shroud, casing, amniotic sac; also found in the compound ċildhama ("child hamr"): womb
  - English: hame – covering, skin, membrane
  - English: heam – amniotic sac; afterbirth
- Old High German: hamo – skin, cover; also found in the compound līhhamo ("lich hamr"): corpse, body of a dead, flesh, shape
- Old Saxon: hamo – same as hamr, found for example as fedhar hamo ("feather hamr")
  - Middle Dutch: hame – covering, sheath
  - Middle Low German: ham – covering, casing; afterbirth (compare amniotic sac)
    - Low German: hamen – afterbirth

== Shapeshifting ==
It was believed that the soul could travel between the body and different forms through so-called "hamr shifts" (Swedish: hamnskifte). In particular, people skilled in witchcraft and sorcery were said to have been able to put themselves in such a state that they could see into other worlds by assuming such a form. The different forms could be of an animal like a bear, eagle, falcon, sheep, swan (compare Leda and the Swan), wolf, etc. Compare the Swedish expression en ulv i fårahamn, lit. 'a wolf in sheep's hamr', "someone who does not show their true self".

When shapeshifted, the user would carry the same properties, abilities, and limitations of the chosen hamr.

=== Shapeshifting costume ===
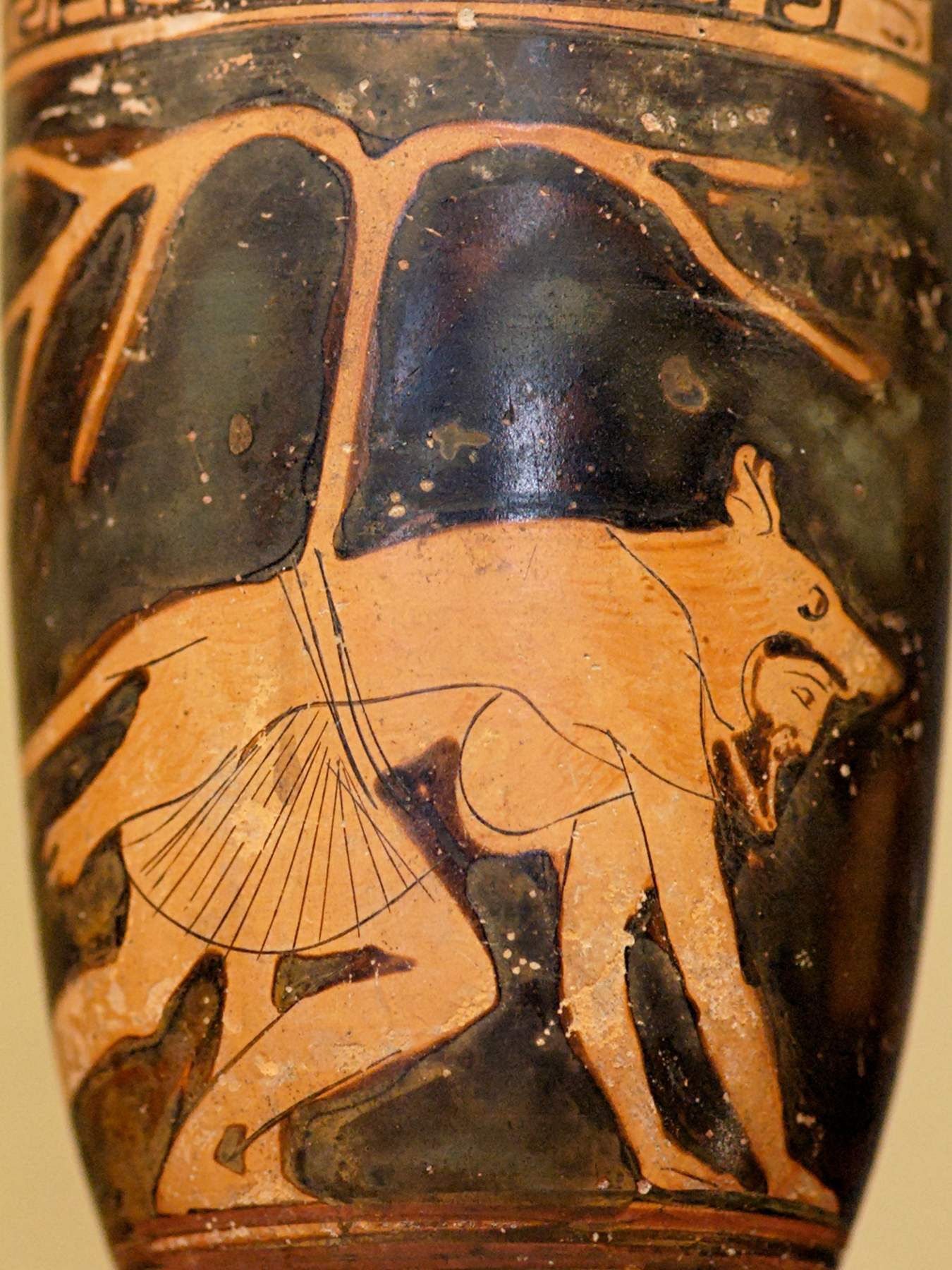
Dolon is wearing a wolfskin. Attic red-figure vase, c. 460 BC.

A feather hamr (bird hamr) is sometimes depicted as a feathered costume that one wears, such as the case with Freyja's falcon hamr. A similar trait could have been present with berserkers and wolfheathens, totem warriors who wore pelts from bear and wolf, respectively. This belief of associating hamr shapeshifting with a costume is a common element in later Norwegian folklore.

This likely is related to the root sense of the word, a Proto-Indo-European root for "covering", which exists as a broad sense in several languages – see § Etymology.

== Norse mythology ==
In Norse mythology, a multitude of characters are able to shapeshift. The Valkyries would shift into ravens when surveying battlefields in search of fallen warriors for Valhalla, transporting such to the afterlife in disguise as a pair of swans.

Modern art depicting a Valkyrie emerging from her raven hamr to collect the fallen

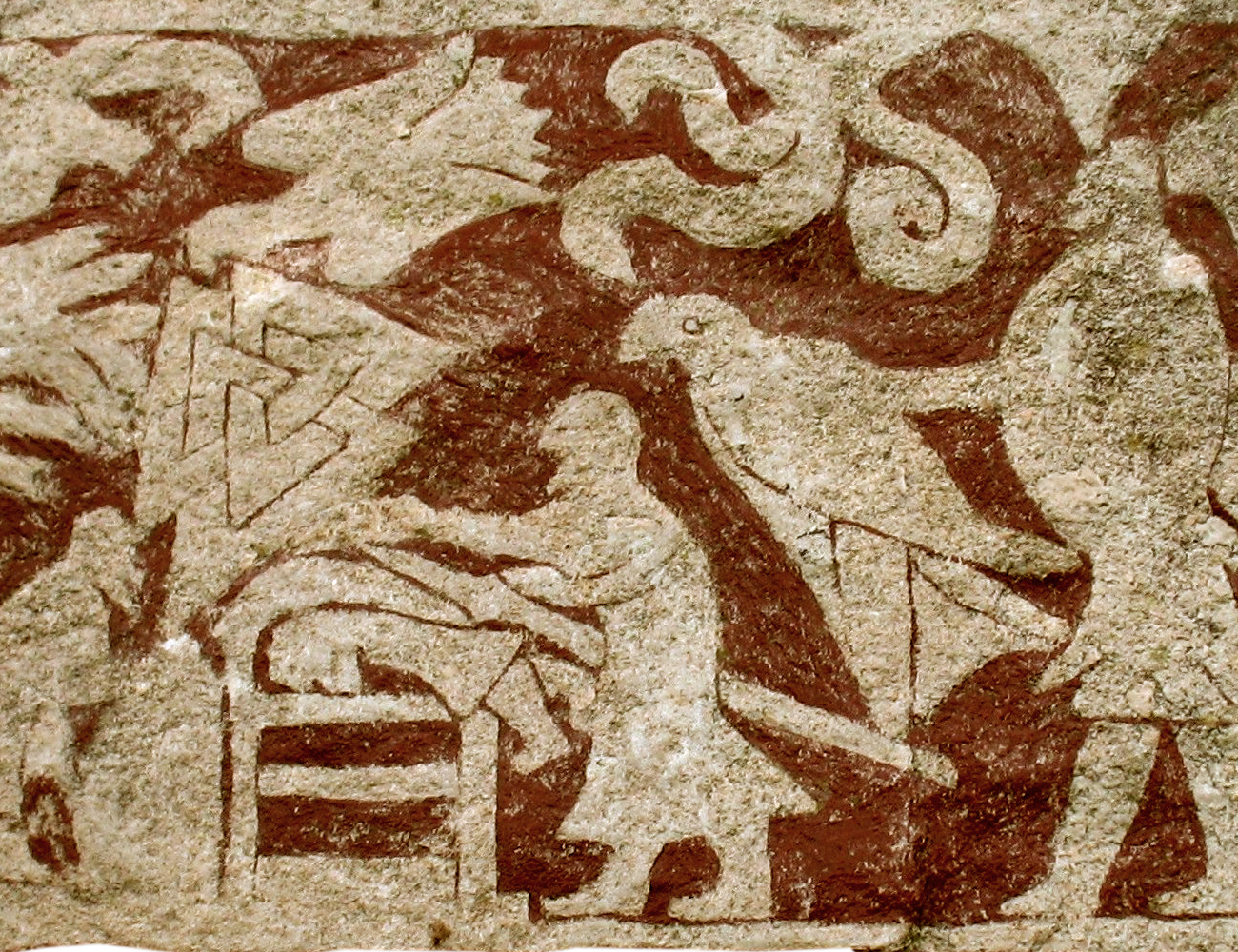
Possible depiction of a Valkyrie in raven hamr (notice the dress)

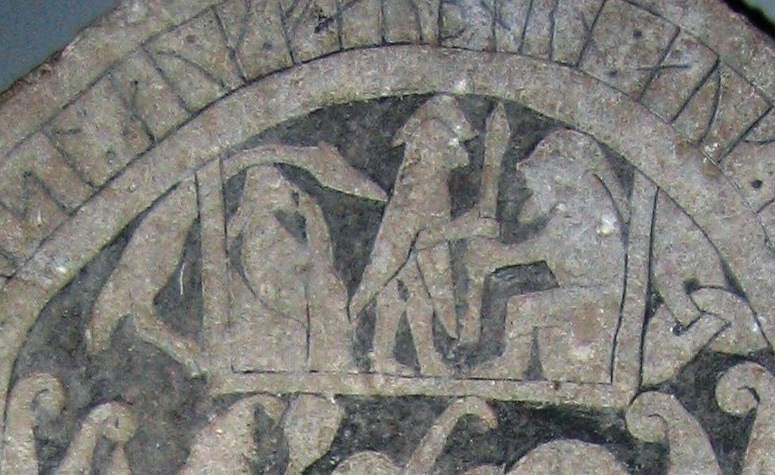
Gotland Runic Inscription 181 depicting a warrior next to a Valkyrie in swan hamr in Valhalla

Among the Æsir, Freyja's falcon hamr is the most talked about. She sometimes lent it to other gods when they needed to travel into the world. The giants Þjazi and Suttungr had an eagle hamr. Loki could transform into various creatures, infamously a mare (a female horse), upon which he became pregnant with the eight-legged horse Sleipnir. Odin infamously likes to disguise himself as an old man, which may or may not be a hamr. It could also be that he magically disguises as himself, granting the ability that no one recognizes him.

The Sigurd-saga infamously features several characters who shapeshift, such as Otr (lit. 'Otter'), who is shifted into an otter when he is killed, Andvari, who is shifted into a fish, and Fafnir, who shifts into a dragon to guard his trasures.

== Nordic folklore ==
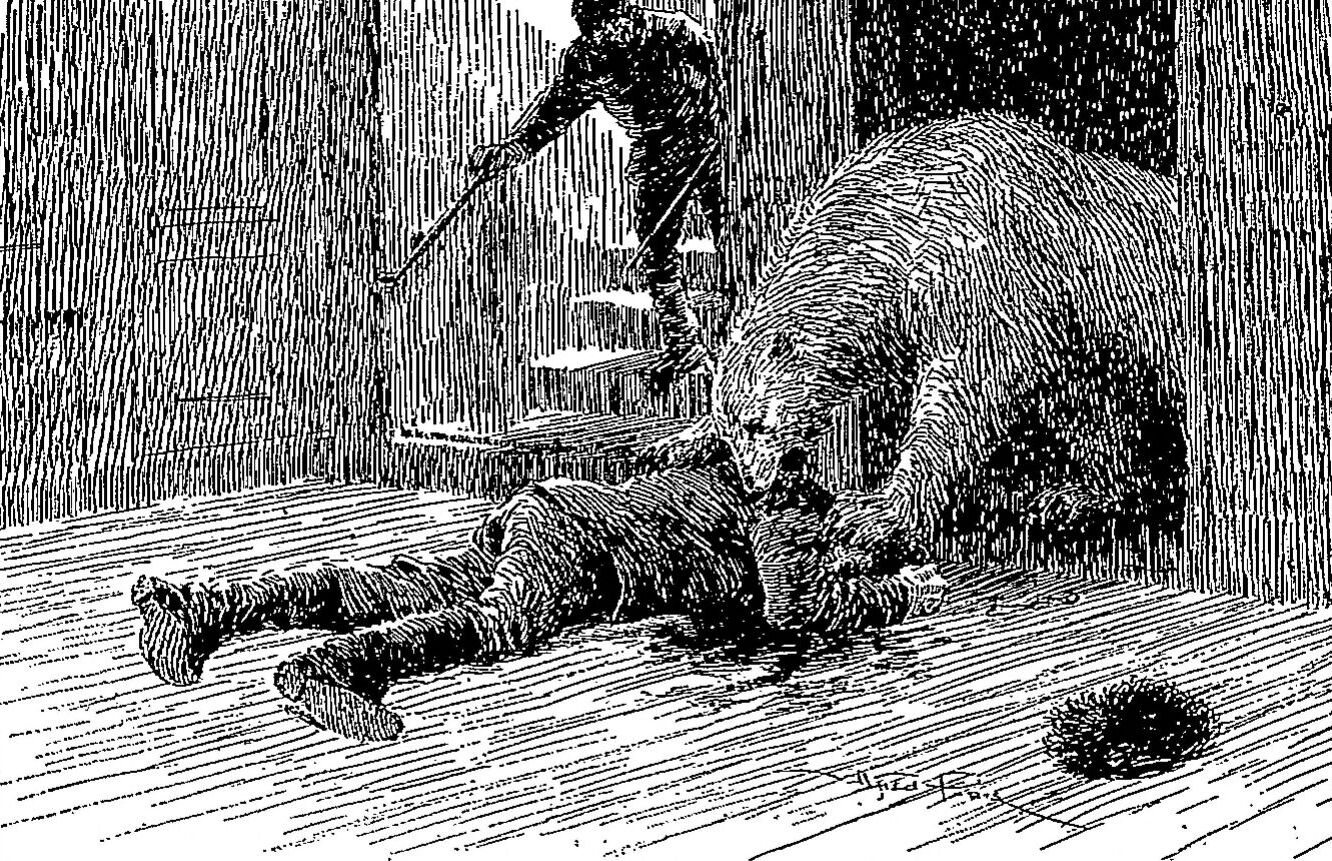
A bear breaking into a house and killing a man.

In Nordic folklore, the folk belief of shapeshifting continued way past the pagan days, in rural populations into the early modern period and beyond. It was believed that evil-minded people and trolls could shift into the form of bears (Swedish: hamnbjörn, lit. 'hamr bear') and wolves (Swedish: hamnvarg, lit. 'hamr wolf') and then attack people or their livestock in anger.

In 1935, on the so called "Dead man's headland" (Dödmansudden) at Hottön in Mörsil, Jämtland, Sweden, a memorial stone was erected, called the "Bear Stone" (since 1965 it has been moved to another location). The stone tells the story of two people who fell to a hamr bear in 1691. The stone reads:

I strid med en homnbjörn föllo här den 22/2 1691 bonden Nils Persson o dragonen Anders Slaghöök båda från Hålland.

Translation:

In combat with a hamr bear, fell here, on the 22/2 1691, farmer Nils Persson, and the dragoon Anders Slaghöök, both from Hålland (Jämtland, Sweden).

=== Werewolves ===
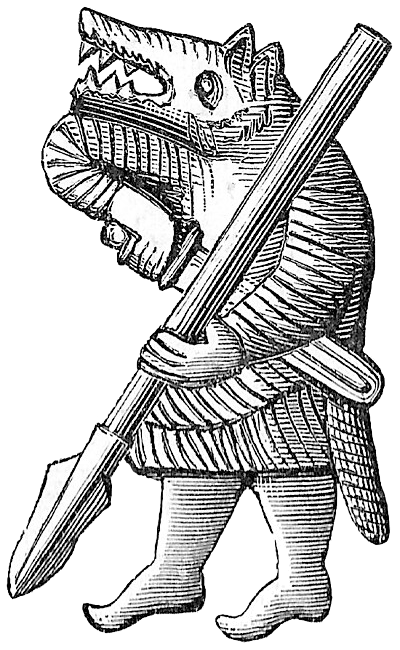
A wolf-headed warrior on one of the Torslunda plates

The myths of hamr have a strong connection to the evolution of the werewolf myth in Medieval Europe. Early connections have been made to the ancient berserkers and wolfheathens, who wore animal pelts of bears and wolves, respectively, and were known to fight like animals. In later Nordic folklore, werewolf has been synonymous with both "hamr wolf" and "hamr bear" ('people transformed into wolves and bears'), more often than not being described as a regular animal than some animal-human hybrid.

Some historic quotes given by the Swedish Institute for Language and Folklore:

There were those who could turn people into a werewolves. They were magicians, and they could turn anyone into them. There was a man who used to turn into an werewolf. Before he was going to run away when he felt it coming on him, he said: 'Just say my name'. See, if they said his name, it would go away. When he came back, he was completely ruined. — I've heard that they used to snarl at people. — Told by August Larsson, born 1861, Främmestad, Västergötland, Sweden

They have talked so much here about a bear that was rampaging, and that wasn't a real bear, they thought. Even our father was out guarding for him (at the cattle shed), but he didn't come. But in a place here west of the river, a village called Långstrand, he came and broke into the cattle shed at a man called Pitte and took a heifer (female cow) and went out through the roof with her. The old man came there and got hold of the axe and hewed and was going to cut down the bear, but he missed and hit to the side. The barn stood there for a long time, and the cut mark was visible there. He then put the scythes in the roof of the cattle shed, so that the bear couldn't come down. But he came once more, and then Pitte had his gun ready and shot at him, and he saw how his hair was smoking, but he wasn't hurt. Then Pitte thought that bullets wouldn't bite that bear, so he cast a bullet with silver in it and was going to shoot him with it, but by then he had gone. — Told by the sisters Johanna (born 1864) and Erika (born 1866) Johansson, Transtrand, Dalarna, Sweden

(She) said that a man up there was turned into a wolf. And then there was a man who disappeared in the neighborhood. He went as a wolf for a whole year. But she wondered why, when she went into the shed, the wolf came and looked in all the time. Someone said that she should then call out her husband's name, and then the wolf became a man. But he kept his butt. — Told 1930 in Möklinta, Västmanland, Sweden

In the village of Rissätra, there has been a legend told, that someone in the village once shot a woman who had 'gone into bear hamr'. The incident was discovered when the shot female bear had braids like a woman. — Told (year not given) in Rissätra, Dalarna, Sweden

== See also ==
- Nachtkrapp
- Bödvar Bjarki
