= Främmestads IK =

Swedish sports club

- Full name: Främmestads idrottsklubb
- Sport: soccer, orienteering
- Based in: Främmestad, Sweden

Främmestads IK is a sports club in Främmestad, Sweden, established 1941. The women's soccer team played in the Swedish top division between 1980 and 1987.
