= Devil Bird =

Bird monster in Sri Lankan folklore

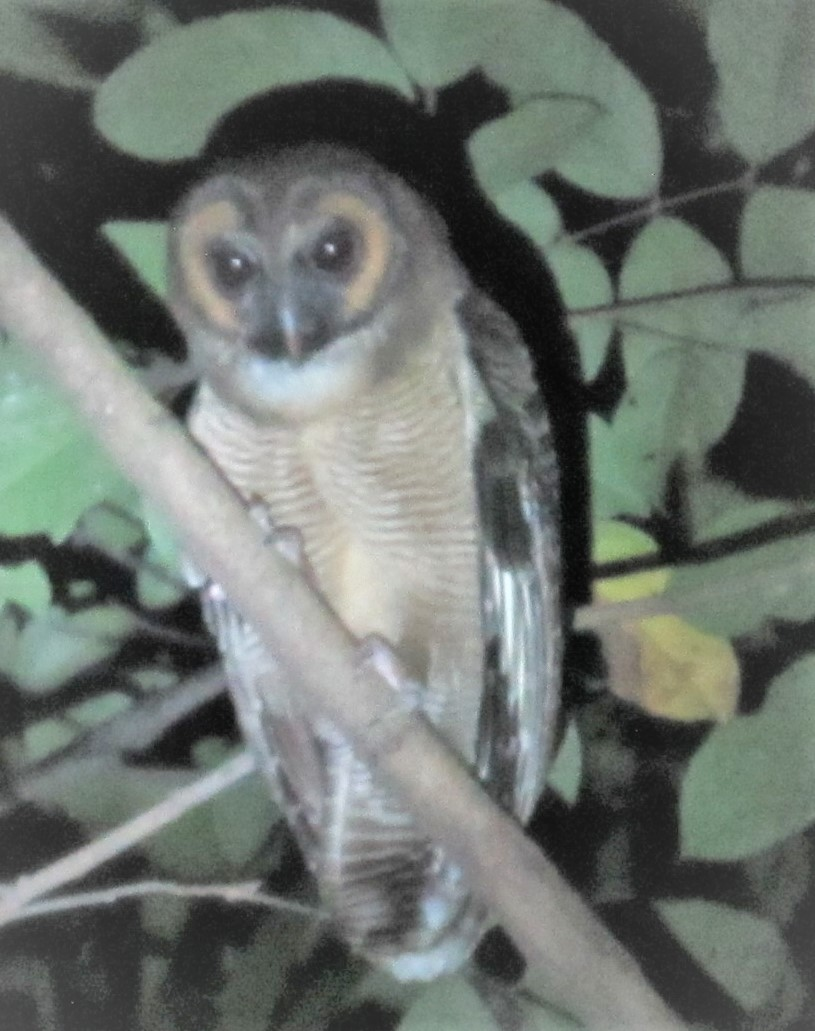
A Brown wood owl in Sri Lanka

In Sri Lankan folklore, the Devil Bird or Ulama (Sinhala: උලමා) is a creature said to emit bloodcurdling human-sounding shrieks in jungles at night. It is believed that the cry of this bird is an omen that portends death. Its precise identity is still a matter of debate although the spot-bellied eagle-owl matches the profile of Devil Bird to a large extent, according to a finding in 2001. Other possible identities include the crested honey buzzard (Pernis ptilorhynchus ruficollis), the Brown wood owl (Strix leptogrammica) and various eagles. As the bird is not usually seen and its cry only described in vague terms, Ulama records might also refer to the Ceylon highland nightjar (Caprimulgus indicus kelaarti).

== See also ==
- Banshee, a similar omen in Irish mythology
- Devil's bird (disambiguation)
- Hakawai, a similar omen in Māori mythology
- Night raven, a similar omen in Germanic folklore
