= Game pieces of the Lewis chessmen hoard =

79 chessmen found in Scotland

Lewis chessmen
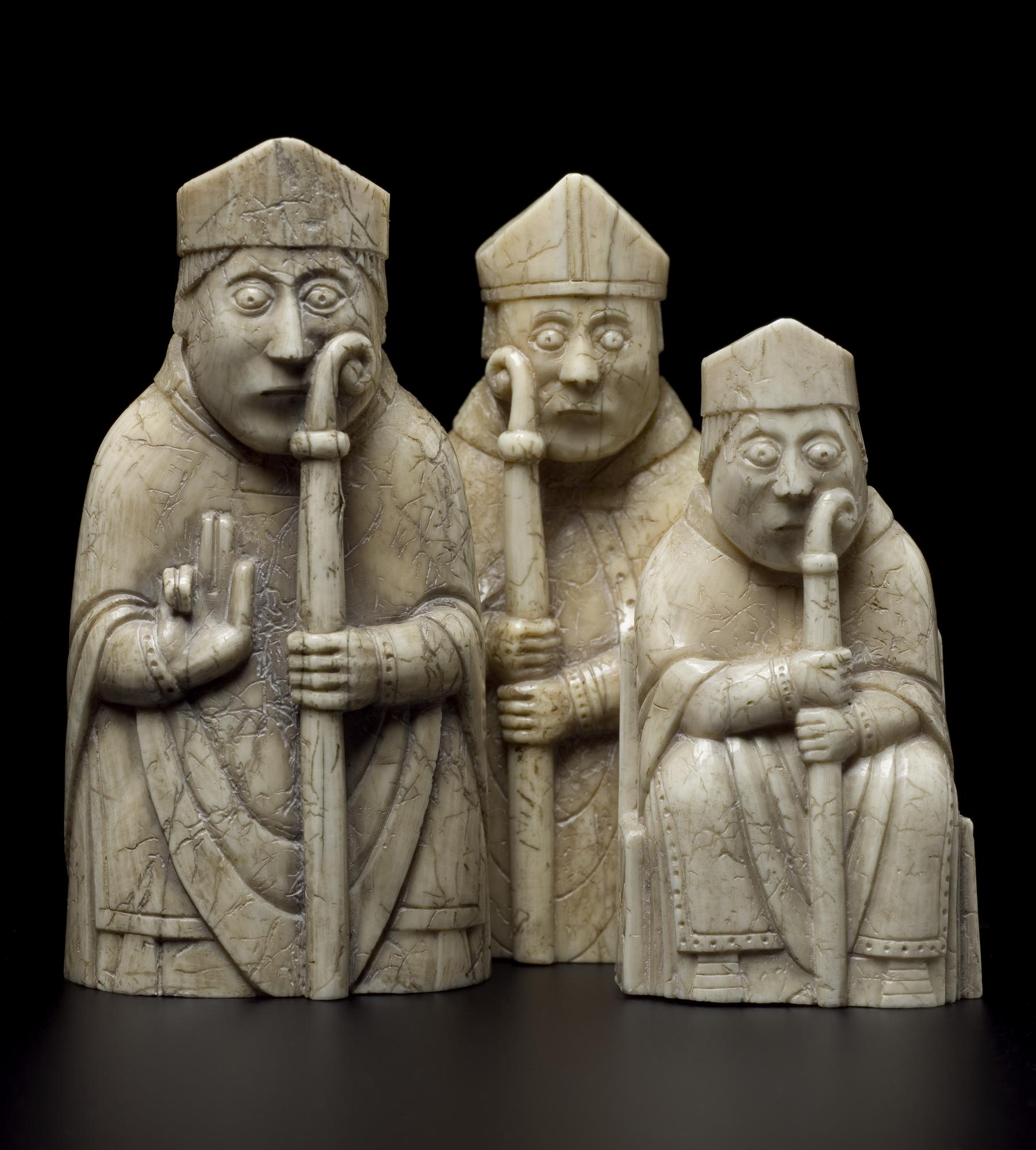
- Lewis chessmen in National Museums Scotland; Three bishops (H.NS 24, 25 & 26)
- Material: Walrus ivory and whale tooth
- Created: 12th century
- Discovered: 1831 or earlier Mealista, Isle of Lewis; 58°06′14″N 7°06′29″W
- Present location: British Museum; National Museums Scotland

The game pieces of the Lewis chessmen hoard consist of ninety-three game pieces of the Lewis chessmen found on the Isle of Lewis in the Outer Hebrides of Scotland. Medieval in origin, they were first exhibited in Edinburgh in 1831 but it is unclear how much earlier they had been discovered. The hoard comprised seventy-eight distinctive chess pieces and fifteen other non-chess pieces, nearly all carved from walrus tusk ivory, and they are now displayed at the British Museum in London and National Museums Scotland in Edinburgh. Another chess piece, which turned up in 1964 and in 2019 was attributed to have come from the original hoard, now belongs to a private collector.

The style of carving, particularly that on the thrones of the seated figures, suggests they are Scandinavian in origin, most likely from Trondheim, the medieval capital of Norway until 1217.

The types of piece are similar to those in modern chess – the chessmen are the earliest found that have figures in clerical dress (bishops). The rooks are represented as warriors which came to be called "warders" at an early stage after they were discovered. Four of the warders are shown biting their shields – these have been identified as the berserkers of the Norse sagas. Christian and pagan influences are both present in the designs.

== Provenance of hoard ==
The hoard of ninety-three games pieces was found on the Isle of Lewis and was exhibited in Edinburgh in 1831. Most accounts have said the pieces were found at Uig Bay (58°11′10″N 7°01′19″W) on the west coast of Lewis but Caldwell et al. of National Museums Scotland (NMS) consider that Mealista (58°06′14″N 7°06′29″W), also in the parish of Uig and some 6 miles (10 km) further south down the coast, is a more likely place for the hoard to have been discovered. The hoard was divided and sold in the 19th century – the British Museum (BM) holds eighty-two pieces and National Museums Scotland has the other eleven pieces. (Note: NMS has published a general introduction to their chessmen.)

At the British Museum it was Sir Frederic Madden, Assistant Keeper of Manuscripts, who persuaded the Trustees to purchase for 80 guineas (£84) the eighty-two pieces which he had been misled into believing was the entire hoard. Madden was a palaeographer, a scholar of early vernacular literature, but he was especially intrigued by these artifacts because he was a chess enthusiast. Madden immediately set about writing a monumental research paper about the collection, Madden (1832) – one that remains informative and impressive today. At both museums the chessmen are an extremely popular exhibit for visitors.

A chess piece was purchased in Edinburgh in 1964 but it was not recognised at the time for what it was – it is now thought to have been made by the same people who made the pieces in the hoard and it was probably originally part of the hoard itself. This piece was sold at auction in 2019 for £735,000. In 2023, the warder piece was displayed at the Neue Galerie New York, as part of a special exhibit of the private collection of gallery founder and investor Ronald Lauder.

== Attributes of types of piece ==
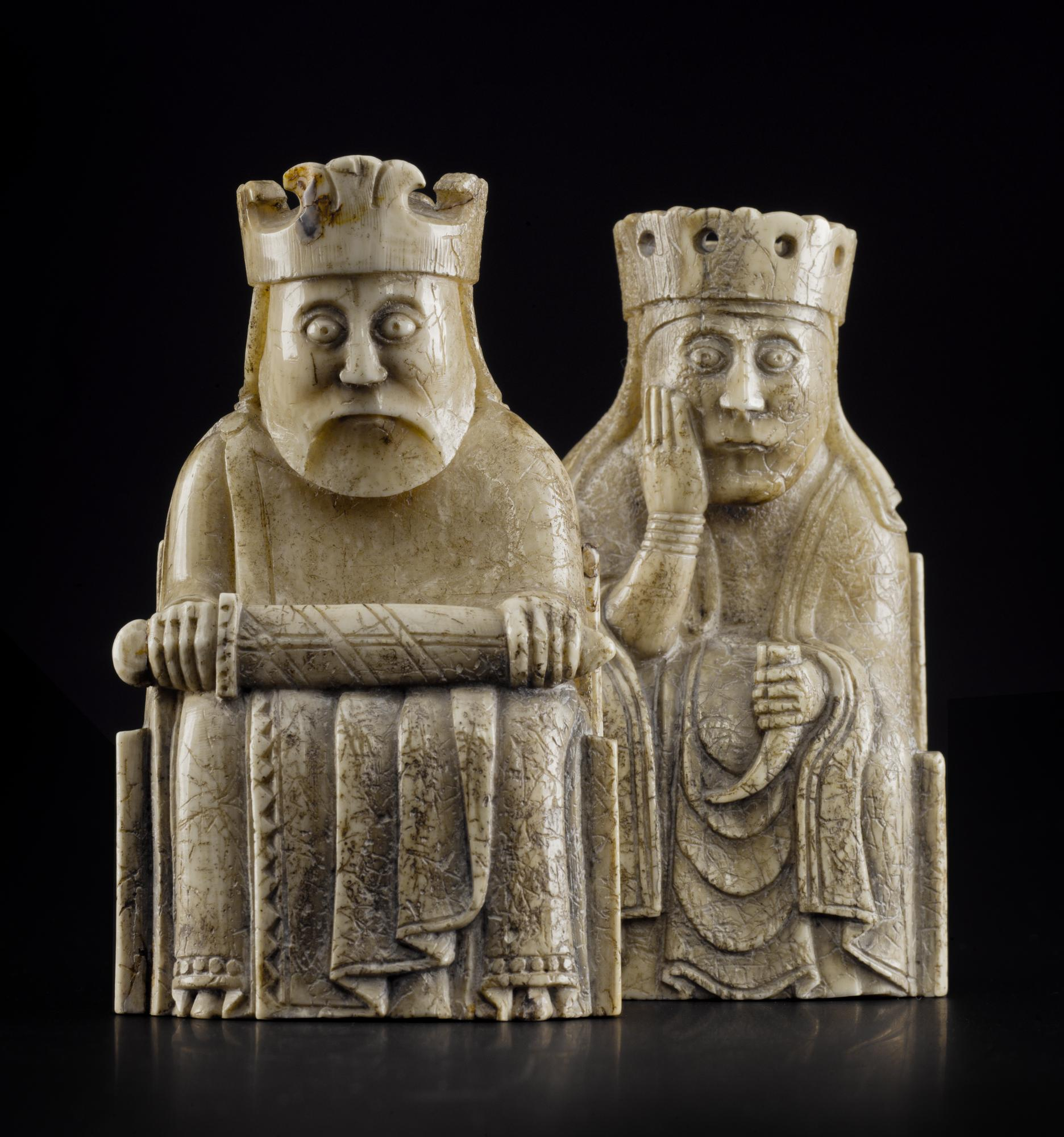
King and queen (H.NS 19 & H.NS 23)

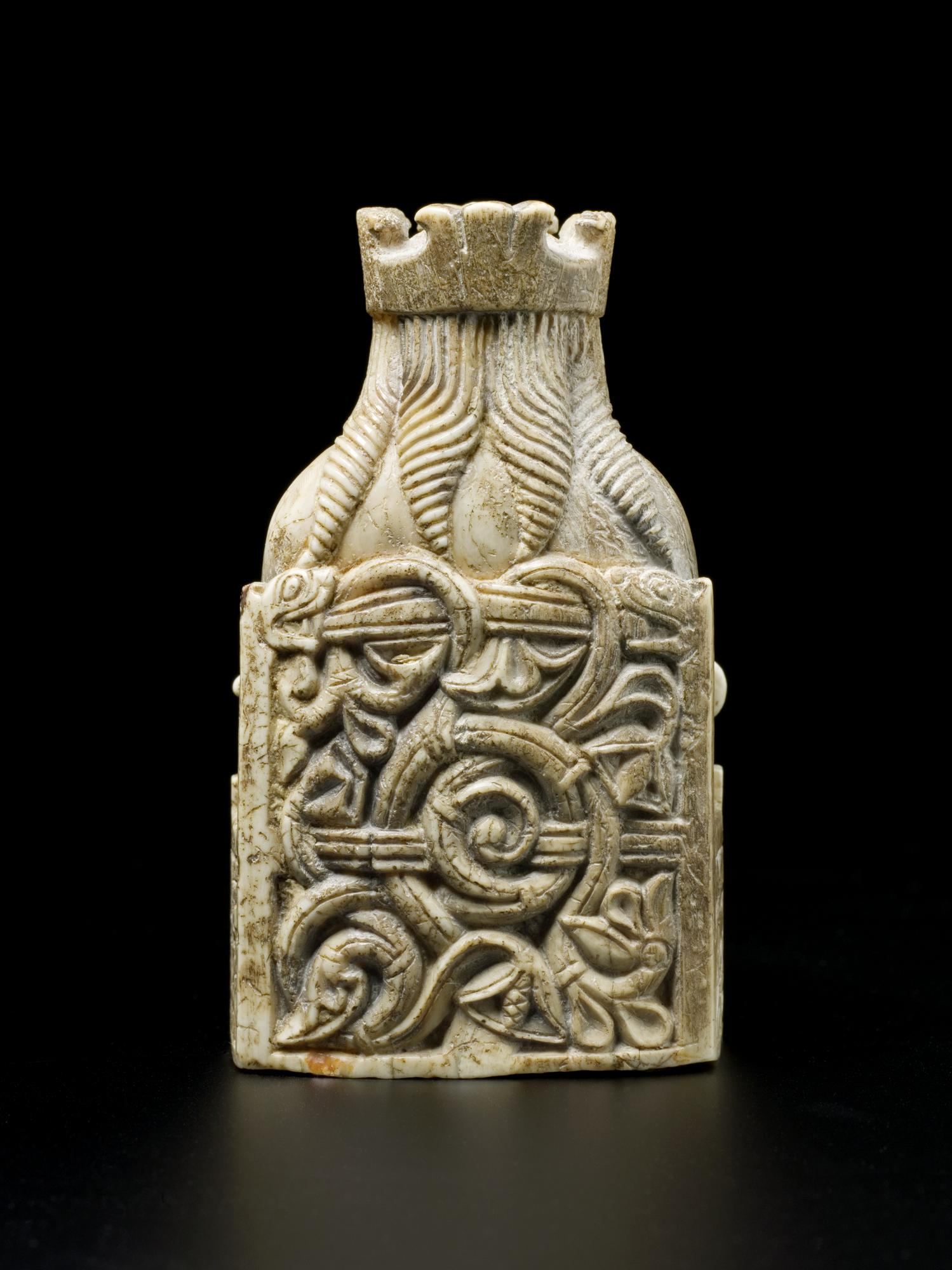
Back of king's throne (H.NS 19)

There are 79 chess pieces, including a warder that emerged in June 2019. (Note: Instead of the modern-day castle-like rooks, warrior pieces were used which were called "warders" by Madden (1832) and the name has stuck. Caldwell et al. count 78 pieces, writing before the discovery of a warder in 2019.)

Number of pieces
Type	Number	No. in BM
Kings	8	6
Queens	8	5
Bishops	16	13
Knights	15	14
Warders	13	10
Pawns	19	19
Discs	14	14
Buckle	1	1
Total	94	82

Of the chess pieces, 60 are major pieces and 19 are pawns. (Note: By "major piece" is meant here kings, queens, bishops, knights and rooks, but not pawns. In the context of the Lewis chessmen the pieces equivalent to rooks appear warrior-like and are usually called warders.) In addition to the carved chess pieces, the hoard includes 14 plain ivory discs, (Note: Dalton (1909) describes the discs but leaves it unclear whether he thought they were part of the hoard. He says a similar piece was found in London in 1844. Recent scholars (and also Madden (1832)) clearly regard the discs as being part of the hoard.) as well as a single ivory buckle, which might have been part of a bag holding the pieces. Most pieces are carved from walrus ivory, while at least three are made from whale tooth. The designs of the pieces in terms of costume correlate to apparel individuals in the 12th century had worn in tandem with their societal role. None of the pieces have any sign of colouring, even under detailed scrutiny, though in 1832 several pieces were reportedly coloured red. (Note: Madden reports 1 king, 1 queen, 3 or 4 bishops, 1 knight, 1 warder and "several" pawns as being coloured red.)

The major pieces all have attributes indicating their role in gameplay. Kings and queens are seated on thrones. The kings have long braided hair (except one) and hold in their right hand a sheathed sword resting across their knees. They wear a long mantle fastened at the right shoulder over various other types of clothing, and their crown has four trefoils. Queens are all cupping their chin in their right hand. Their long hair in braids is covered with a veil and their crown is either like the kings' or has a continuous pierced band. Covering their gown, the queens have a long mantle or cloak leaving a gap at the front.

The bishops are most variable in design – some are standing and others are seated and they are dressed in one of two types of liturgical vestments: five wear a cope over a tunicle, and the others wear pontifical vestments: a chasuble and stole over a dalmatic, over an alb. They are all clean-shaven, wear a mitre over their cropped shoulder-length hair, and are holding a crozier with one or both hands. Some bishops are holding a book or are giving a blessing.

The knights have beards and moustaches and are mounted on rather small horses equipped with stirrups and bridles. (Note: Boehm suggests the horses resemble Icelandic horses which, although small, are sturdier than Shetland ponies.) They are wearing long gambesons with belts and are carrying spears and long, narrow kite-shaped shields. When they carry swords they are hung from a baldric over the shoulder.

The warders have long straight hair and they are all standing with drawn swords, variously shaped helmets, and shields – four warders are biting their shields. Most are wearing long gambesons but a few wear chain mail, usually incorporating a chain mail hood. (Note: Caldwell et al. (2011), p. 33 Stratford (1997), p. 15 Madden (1832), pp. 229–235)

British Museum image of disc,
50 mm diameter (1831,1101.147)

The pawns are not figurative in design and are either bullet-shaped or slab-like. Two have some engraved ornamentation. The discs are very plain with two or three inscribed circumferential circles.

== List of pieces ==
List of ninety-four extant pieces
Catalogue number (Note: H.NS 19–29 are in National Museums Scotland; 1831,1101.78–159 are in the British Museum. The links are to images on the museums' online catalogues and to 3D images.)	Type (Note: The numbers are those adopted by Madden (1832) who numbered the BM pieces separately for each type of piece. Stratford provides the concordance and a ? indicates where he was in some doubt. Sorting is according to the position of the piece on the chess board – it is not alphabetical.)	Height (mm) (Note: Heights in Caldwell et al. (2011), pp. 22–29. Dimensions of bases and the perimeters of the bases, which vary between 170 mm and 60 mm, given in Madden. For the discs the diameter, not thickness, is recorded as given on the BM online catalogue.)	Weight (g) (Note: Weights from the BM web page for each piece.)	Image (link)	Group/ Set (Note: For the major chess pieces Caldwell et al. suggest a "group" (A – E and X, X being unallocated), indicating the style of carving of the faces. Also a "set" (1 – 4) indicating which of four chess sets the piece might belong to, judging by the size.)	Notes (Note: The various type of piece have the attributes mentioned above unless otherwise stated here. Unless otherwise stated the descriptions are drawn from Robinson (2004), Caldwell et al. (2011) and, for the BM pieces, the BM online catalogue pages and Stratford (1997). Also, for the NMS pieces, the NMS online catalogue pages.)
none (3D)	warder	88		Sotheby's (2019)		Wearing gambeson, conical helmet (point damaged) with ear flaps. Neck flap lost through damage. Face damaged. Bought for £5 in 1964 with unknown provenance; sold in 2019 for £735,000. (Note: See #Analysis below for radiocarbon dating of this piece.) Current owner of the piece is Ronald Lauder.
H.NS 19 (3D)	king	96		also rear & side	D2	Bearded. Wearing a dalmatic under mantle.
H.NS 20 (3D)	king	73		rear & side	X4	Wearing a tunic under mantle.
H.NS 21 (3D)	queen	92		also rear	D2	Wearing a long cloak over a long-sleeved gown.
H.NS 22 (3D)	queen	70		also rear	C4	Wearing cloak over knee-length long-sleeved gown and undergarment. The left side of the throne is from a separate piece of ivory, pinned on at the time of original manufacture.
H.NS 23 (3D)	queen	93		also rear	D2	Holding a drinking or money horn.
H.NS 24 (3D)	bishop	92		also rear	E2	Seated on throne, wearing cope over chasuble. Grasping crosier with both hands.
H.NS 25 (3D)	bishop	93		also rear	D2	Standing. Wearing pontifical vestments. Right hand blesses and left hand holds crosier.
H.NS 26 (3D)	bishop	73		rear & side	B4	Seated on throne, wearing pontifical vestments. Grasping crosier with both hands.
H.NS 27 (3D)	knight	89		rear & side	X2	Wearing conical helmet. Bearing spear. Carved from sperm whale tooth.
H.NS 28 (3D)	warder	92		rear & side	E2	Wearing gambeson, sword raised. Carved from sperm whale tooth
H.NS 29 (3D)	warder	82		also rear	E3	Berserker. Wearing gambeson, biting the top of shield with sword raised.
1831,1101.78 (3D)	king 1	98 (Note: Height from the BM web page for the piece.)	215		A1	Bearded. Crown with floral design. Brooch on mantle over tunic. Sheathed sword. Chair back with floral scrolls and dragon with floral tail. Interlaced designs on sides.
1831,1101.79	king 2	99	245		D1	Beardless. Seated on high-backed chair holding sheathed sword. Crown with floral design. Brooch, mantle over tunic. Chair back with floral scrolls, upper ones held by animals' heads on uprights. Sides with interlaced decoration.
1831,1101.80 (3D)	king 4	89			B3	Bearded. Seated upon high-backed chair holding sheathed sword. Wearing floral crown, mantle over tunic and brooch. Chair back decorated with floral scrolls framed by two heads of animals. Madden described this as originally red.
1831,1101.81	king 5	91		@Dalton	B3	Beardless, shoulder-length hair. Sword with baldric wound around. Guard decorated. Back of throne decorated with animal heads at top of uprights framing symmetrical leaf-scrolls. Damaged crown.
1831,1101.82 (3D)	king 3	95		@Dalton	X2	Bearded. Crown with hatched band. Back of throne decorated with three vertical panels of trefoils, geometric interlace and sinuous scrolls. Damaged sword.
1831,1101.83	king 6	79			C4	Bearded, wearing floral crown, mantle over tunic and brooch. Seated holding sheathed sword. High chair back has two horizontal compartments separated by zigzag, upper with interlaced arches, lower floral designs. Chair sides with interlacing.
1831,1101.84	queen 1	96	156		C1	Holding drinking or money horn. Floral crown over veil. Seated in chair ornamented on back with leaf scrolls and animal heads on uprights. Chair sides have interlaced design.
1831,1101.85	queen 5	80		queen, left. side view and @Dalton	B3	Crown (damaged) decorated with pierced hole. One hand around knee holding a cloth, maybe a veil. Back of throne decorated possibly with facing lions with floral tails.
1831,1101.86 (3D)	queen 4	80			B3	Floral crown, veil, mantle over gown. Chair ornamented on back with two animals back-to-back with floral extremeties. Animal heads on top of uprights. Madden described this as very deep red.
1831,1101.87	queen 3	76			X4	Back of throne divided into two panels, upper decorated with foliage, lower with interlaced arches. Sides decorated with panels of foliage. Damaged crown.
1831,1101.88 (3D)	queen 2	97			C1	Seated, wearing floral crown, veil, mantle over gown. Chair back with leaf scrolls. Cloth hanging over top of back of chair.
1831,1101.89	bishop 2	97			D1	Seated wearing pontifical vestments, holding book. Back of throne decorated with two panels of leaf scrolls.
1831,1101.90	bishop 1	97			D1	Seated wearing pontifical vestments, low mitre with lappets. Right hand raised in blessing. Back of chair has two pairs of adjacent leaf-scrolls.
1831,1101.91	bishop 3	87			B3	Seated wearing pontifical vestments, hand raised, back of throne decorated with leaf scrolls. Damaged crozier.
1831,1101.92	bishop 4	82			B4	Seated wearing pontifical vestments, holding book. back of throne decorated with overlapping arcades and interlace. Madden described this as originally red.
1831,1101.93	bishop 5	82			D4	Seated wearing pontifical vestments, holding book. Back of chair fretwork, top cross-bar with animal heads. Chair sides incised parallelograms and semicircles. Madden described this as very deep red.
1831,1101.94	bishop 11?	89			C3	Standing wearing cope. (Note: But Caldwell et al. note a chasuble showing underneath to one side – a mistake in the workmanship.)
1831,1101.95	bishop 8?	95			C2	Standing wearing cope and mitre with lappets. Madden described this as originally red.
1831,1101.96	bishop 12	95			C1	Standing wearing cope.
1831,1101.97	bishop 13?	76			B4	Standing wearing pontifical vestments. Damaged crozier.
1831,1101.98 (3D)	bishop 7	95	179		D2	Standing wearing cope and mitre with lappets. Holding book.
1831,1101.99	bishop 9	83			C3	Standing wearing cope. Holding book.
1831,1101.100	bishop 6	102	150	@Dalton	C1	Standing wearing pontifical vestments. Holding book.
1831,1101.101	bishop 10	83		(Note: Dalton (1909) does not provide an illustration.)	C3	Standing wearing pontifical vestments. Holding book. Madden described this as red. (Note: Stratford says 1831,1101.100 was said to be red but this is clearly a misprint for 1831,1101.101.)
1831,1101.102	knight 13	73			C4	Wearing kettle hat. Sword. Shield divided in halves horizontally with interlaced saltire on cross-hatched ground. Madden described this as red.
1831,1101.103	knight 10	73			C4	Wearing kettle hat. Sword. Shield, halved vertically and to one side cross-hatched.
1831,1101.104	knight 9	88			C3	Bearded. Wearing kettle hat. Sword. Shield with saltire over a cross inside border.
1831,1101.105	knight 11	80			X3	Wearing kettle hat and spear in right hand. Shield with dotted bands making cross over central circle. Piece damaged and split.
1831,1101.106	knight 12	80			X3	Bearded, wearing conical helmet. Sword. Shield with interlaced saltire.
1831,1101.107 (3D)	knight 8	84			A3	Bearded, wearing conical helmet. Sword. Shield with diamond shape inscribed in square.
1831,1101.108	knight 7	89			A2	Bearded, wearing conical helmet. Sword. Shield with cross and diamond shape in centre.
1831,1101.109	knight 14	79			B4	Wearing conical helmet with neck and ear-pieces decorated with St Andrew's cross. Sword. Shield with cross and square.
1831,1101.110	knight 5	91			A2	Conical helmet. Shield decorated with incised diamond shape. Damaged.
1831,1101.111	knight 6	90			A2	Conical helmet with neck and ear pieces. Long tunic with belt. Sword. Shield having cross with circles.
1831,1101.112	knight 3	103			X1	Conical helmet with neck and ear-pieces. Ornamented headband. Sword belt. Two quarters of shield cross-hatched.
1831,1101.113	knight 4	100	150		A1	Conical helmet with decorated neck and ear pieces.
1831,1101.114	knight 2	101			A1	Conical helmet with neck and ear pieces with crescent decoration. Shield has cross with diamond shape over centre.
1831,1101.115	knight 1	100	163	@Dalton	A1	Wearing conical helmet with neck and ear-pieces. Shield with rectangle inscribed with saltire on cross.
1831,1101.116	warder 2	100			A1	Bearded, wearing gambeson, conical helmet with neck and ear flaps. Shield to left side with diamond shape in centre.
1831,1101.117	warder 3	98			A1	Wearing gambeson, conical helmet with ear and neck flaps, kite shield and sword held upright. Face damaged.
1831,1101.118 (3D)	warder 1	93		@Dalton	A2	Bearded, wearing gambeson. conical helmet with neck and ear flaps. Kite-shaped shield in front with cross inscribed in diamond shape.
1831,1101.119	warder 4	90		warder, right @Dalton	D2	Bearded, looking slightly sideways, wearing gambeson and conical helmet with neck and ear flaps, incised crosses and ornamented encircling head band. Kite-shaped shield with saltire within circle. Probably carved from whale tooth.
1831,1101.120	warder 5	89			B3	Bearded, wearing gambeson, conical helmet with central ridge, kite-shaped shield with incised cross and central square, sword held diagonally. Piece damaged.
1831,1101.121	warder 9	79			X4	Wearing gambeson, helmet ornamented with band of diamond shapes. Kite-shaped shield having cross with small concentric circles in centre plus zigzag ornament. Probably carved from whale tooth.
1831,1101.122	warder 10	71			D4	Wearing long pleated garment, baldric and kettle hat helmet with straight brim. Shield has cross with diamond shape.
1831,1101.123	warder 7	92			X2	Berserker. Chain mail, no hood, sword in scabbard and conical helmet with vertical fluting and band of dots. Shield with cross, each arm with double row of dots flanking median line.
1831,1101.124	warder 6	85	102		C3	Berserker. Enraged look. Chain mail, sword in scabbard, chain mail hood and conical helmet with encircling bands. Shield with cross with large circle in centre, inscribed with saltire.
1831,1101.125 (3D)	warder 8	82		@Dalton	C3	Berserker. Chain mail and chain mail hood with no helmet. Sword in scabbard. Shield has interlaced saltire. Madden described this piece as red.
1831,1101.126 (3D)	pawn 1	59	62			59x33x23 mm. Ridged projection on top. Rounded top with trefoil knob, flat sides, front and back slightly convex. Probably carved from whale tooth.
1831,1101.127	pawn 6	51		@Dalton		Decorated with pairs of leaf scrolls. Rounded top, flat sides, front and back slightly convex.
1831,1101.128	pawn 5	52				Geometric interlace decoration. Rounded top, flat sides, front and back slightly convex.
1831,1101.129	pawn 2?	56	51			Rounded top, flat sides, front and back slightly convex.
1831,1101.130	pawn 3?	80				Front and back flat with bevelled edges. Not ornamented.
1831,1101.131 (3D)	pawn 4?	55				55x28x21 mm. Rounded top, flat sides, front and back slightly convex.
1831,1101.132	pawn 7	56				Pointed top, crest has small knob. Octagonal section.
1831,1101.133	pawn	51				Pointed top. Octagonal section. Probably carved from whale tooth.
1831,1101.134	pawn	40				Pointed top. Octagonal section.
1831,1101.135	pawn	40				Pointed top. Octagonal section.
1831,1101.136	pawn	40				Pointed top. Octagonal section.
1831,1101.137	pawn	40				Pointed top. Octagonal section.
1831,1101.138	pawn	40				Pointed top. Octagonal section.
1831,1101.139	pawn	40				Pointed top. Octagonal section.
1831,1101.140	pawn	40				Pointed top. Octagonal section.
1831,1101.141	pawn	40				Pointed top. Octagonal section.
1831,1101.142	pawn	40				Pointed top. Octagonal section.
1831,1101.143	pawn	40				Pointed top. Octagonal section.
1831,1101.144	pawn	40				Pointed top. Octagonal section.
1831,1101.145	buckle	63		@Madden		10x29x63 mm. Front engraved with floral designs on hatched background. Tongue turning on copper wire.
1831,1101.146	disc	50				50x11 mm. Two incised circles around circumference.
1831,1101.147	disc	50				50x15 mm. Three incised circles around circumference.
1831,1101.148	disc	52				52 mm diameter. Two incised circles around circumference.
1831,1101.149	disc	49				49x13 mm. Two incised circles around circumference.
1831,1101.150	disc	51				51 mm diameter. Two incised circles around circumference.
1831,1101.151	disc	52				52 mm diameter. Two incised circles around circumference.
1831,1101.152	disc	52				52 mm diameter. Two incised circles around circumference.
1831,1101.153	disc	53				53 mm diameter. Two incised circles around circumference.
1831,1101.154 (3D)	disc	53				53 mm diameter. Two incised circles around circumference.
1831,1101.155	disc	54				54 mm diameter. Two incised circles around circumference.
1831,1101.156	disc	53				53 mm diameter. Two incised circles around circumference.
1831,1101.157	disc	53				53 mm diameter. Two incised circles around circumference.
1831,1101.158	disc	53				53 mm diameter. Two incised circles around circumference.
1831,1101.159	disc	53				53 mm diameter. Two incised circles around circumference.

== Bishops, warders and berserkers ==
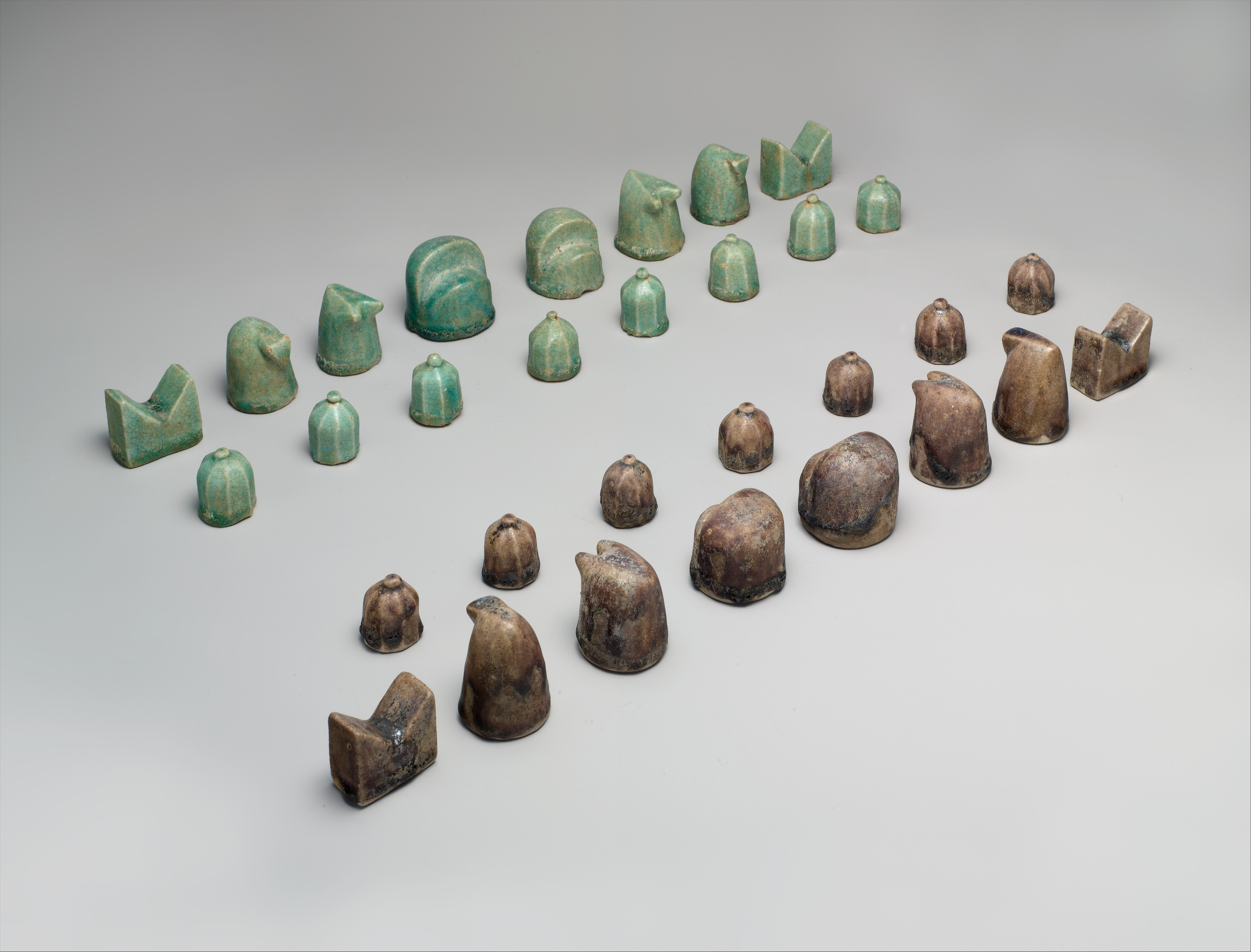
12th century Iranian Shatranj set

When chess was first developed in India, the piece that eventually became the bishop was the elephant and the rook was originally the chariot (called rukh in Persian). Under Islamic influence the pieces later became abstract in design. When the game spread into medieval Europe the design of most pieces returned to being figurative once more. The rook was an exception to this and thus the warrior rooks of the Lewis collection are unusual in this sense. The Lewis sets are the earliest to be found that include any sort of clerical figure, in this case bishops, although a few single pieces depicting bishops have been found that may be earlier.

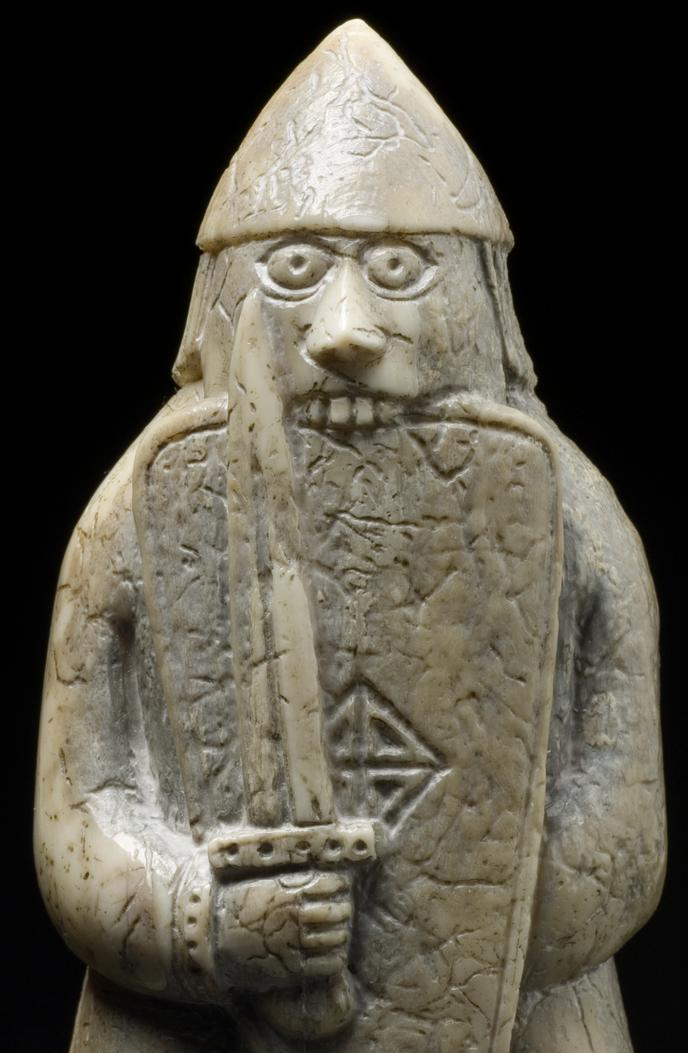
Berserker (H.NS 29)

In his 1832 research paper, Madden called the warriors "warders" to imply a status between that of foot soldier and knight – this name has stuck. Madden was the first person to understand that the pieces showing warriors biting their shields were representing berserkers – warriors who fought in a frenzied fury, possibly in a drug-induced trance. From his scholarship in paleography Madden knew that the Norse sagas tell that berserkers were known for biting their shields. For example, in about 1225, writing in emerging Christian times but looking back to pagan times, the poet historian Snorri Sturluson wrote

Odin could make his enemies in battle blind, or deaf, or terror-struck, and their weapons so blunt that they could no more cut than a willow twig; on the other hand, his men rushed forwards without armour, were as mad as dogs or wolves, bit their shields, and were strong as bears or wild bulls, and killed people at a blow, and neither fire nor iron told upon them. These were called Bersærkers.

— Snorri Sturluson, "Ynglinga saga", Heimskringla (Note: Laing, the translator of the saga provides a footnote: "Bersærker — so called from ber, bare; and serkr shirt: that is, bare of any shirt of mail, as they fought without armour. The Bersærkers appear to have gone into battle intoxicated with opium, or some exciting drug; as the reaction after their bersærker gang was over, and their lassitude and exhaustion, prove the use of some stimulant previously to a great excess." It may be that ber derives from ber, "bear" (as in bear skin) rather than bjǫrn "bare" (naked).)

== Carving on thrones ==
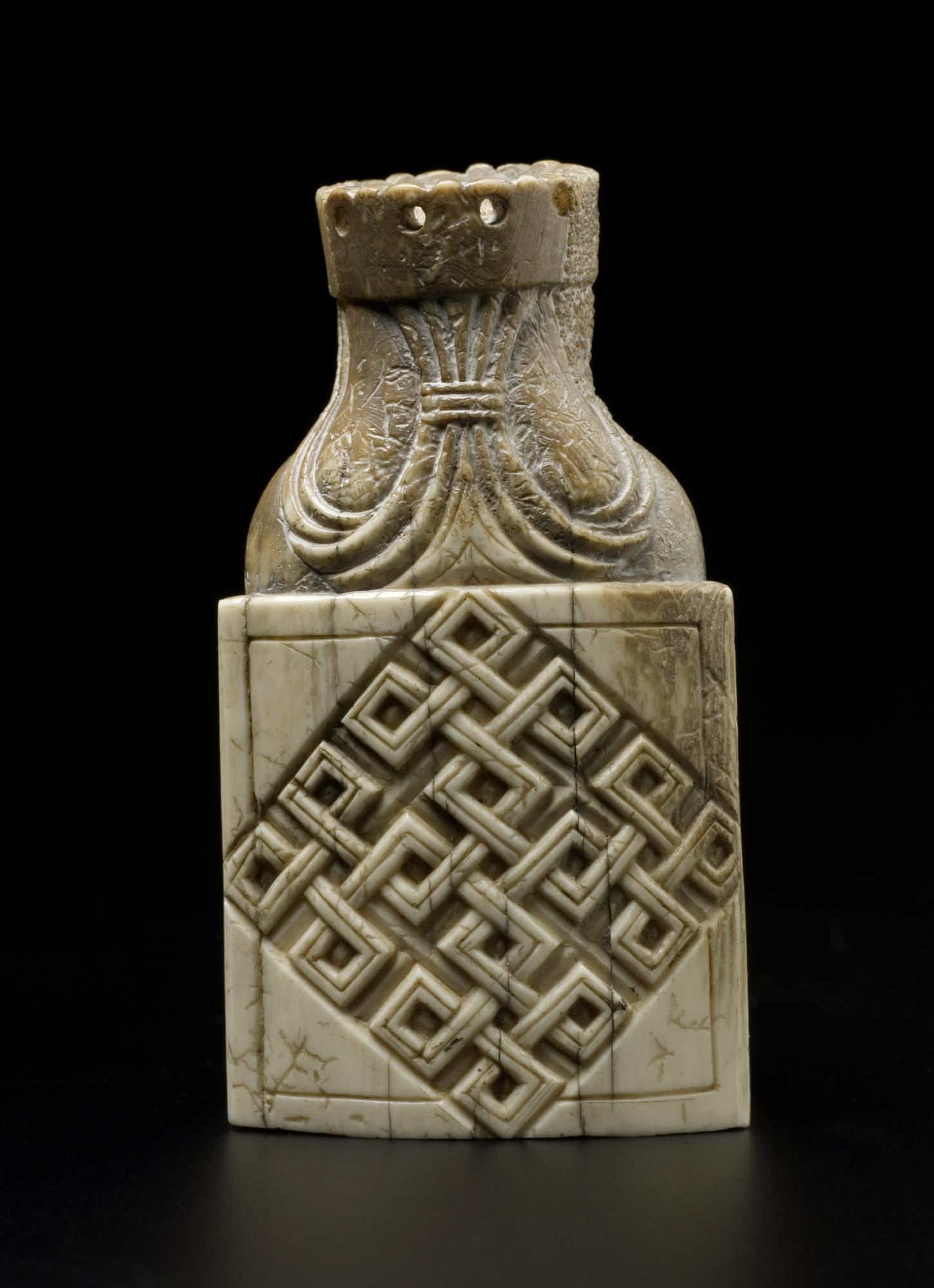
Queen's throne (H.NS 21)

The kings, queens and seven of the bishops are seated on thrones with elaborately carved backs and sides. Deeply carved scrolls of foliage, sometimes including beasts, have frequently been used but on other pieces interlaced geometrical designs have been adopted. A horizontal or vertical bar may be used allowing more than one design to be displayed. The decorations on the thrones are often more boldly carved than on the figures themselves – the individual workman, freed from the need to produce a figure with specific attributes, could operate outside any tight constraints of a pattern book. Two pawns and the buckle have similar designs in shallow engraving.

The distinctive motifs of the ornamental panels of the thrones have been used to associate the chess pieces with group of twelfth century carvings, not of chess pieces, centred around both Scandinavia and East Anglia. This group consists of four walrus ivories (three of which are based in The National Museum of Denmark and one in The British Museum), three Norwegian wooden stave churches at Urnes, Ulvik and Hopperstad; and finally the Monk's Doorway and Prior's Doorways of Ely Cathedral. This group is speculated to constitute a flow of artistic ideas across the North Sea between regions linked by close ecclesiastical and mercantile contacts.

The back of the king's throne (H.NS 19) is shown above and the main table includes links to images of the backs and sides of some of the other pieces.

== Analysis ==
Most experts have been cautious in interpreting the meaning of the queens cupping their chins in their hands. However, James Robinson (Note: Robinson is Senior Curator, Late Medieval Collections, Department of Prehistory and Europe, British Museum.) suggests their pose indicates sorrow – compassion for the troops who have fallen in battle.

The considerable overall similarity in design and carving technique, but with idiosyncratic differences between individual pieces, leads experts to think the sets were made by several people all working at the same place. In terms of number of pieces, the chessmen could be part of four chess sets, although they could be from more. If there were four sets then 49 pieces are missing – a knight, three warders and 45 pawns. (Note: Caldwell et al. were writing before the warder was found and so they say four warders are missing. They also say 44 pawns are missing but this seems to be an arithmetical mistake.)

The pieces are dated by experts to have been made in the later stages of the twelfth century when Europe had a strong international culture stretching from Greenland to the Holy Land. As clues to when they were made, the bishops' mitres have their peaks at the front and back – until about 1150 the custom was to have the peaks sideways. The shields of the knights and warders have no heraldic markings displaying heredity – scholars think this dates the pieces to before the start of the thirteenth century. Caldwell et al. think the differences between the bishops' mitres may reflect a change of style from mid-12th to early 13th century. The high peaks and arched headbands of two of the bishops' mitres (Note: Bishops 1831,1101.94 and 1831,1101.99 wear such mitres. Also the shields with flat tops may be of the 13th century.) may be from the 13th century. The warder recently found is the only piece to have had radiocarbon dating performed. Two independent analyses give 1283–1479 and 1328–1434 (95% confidence intervals) for the walrus ivory – further analysis is required to resolve the difference from the estimates made from the style of the work.

Carving of a similar style has been found at Trondheim in Norway so it is often put forward as the place of manufacture. It is only in Scandinavia that there was a tradition of berserkers – warriors who fought ferociously, possibly in a trance.

Back in 1832 Madden had suggested an Icelandic origin, not only based on style but on his thought that only in Iceland was the piece called biskup and that elsewhere unrelated words were used for pieces with no clerical connections. However, it is now generally considered the pieces were probably made in Trondheim – a royal centre and the location of the archbishop's cathedral – or, less likely, Bergen.

In 2010 an Icelandic civil engineer and former politician argued that the pieces were carved in Iceland. Madeline Bunting writes that this "sparked an ill-tempered argument with Norwegian and British archaeologists". The historian Alex Woolf rejected the idea: "the pieces would have had to have been made where there were wealthy patrons to employ craftsmen and pay for the material. 'A hell of a lot of walrus ivory went into making those chessmen, and Iceland was a bit of a scrappy place full of farmers,' Dr. Woolf said."

For the pieces in the British Museum, Madden (1832) gives detailed descriptions and a few line drawings and Dalton (1909) provides comprehensive descriptions and photographs, Dalton numbering them from 78 to 144 as is still current. 3D images of some of the pieces are available on a website supported by the British Museum and National Museums Scotland.

Groups of pieces for each set and type
	Kings	Queens	Bishops	Knights	Warders
Set 1	AD	CC	CDDD	AAAX	AA - -
Set 2	DX	DD	CCDE	AAAX	ADEX
Set 3	BB	BB	BCCC	ACXX	BCCE
Set 4	CX	CX	BBBD	BCC -	DX - -

Average height (mm) for each set and type (Note: Calculated from Caldwell et al. (2011), pp. 22–29)
	Kings	Queens	Bishops	Knights	Warders
Set 1	102.0	96.5	97.7	101.0	99.0
Set 2	95.5	92.5	93.7	89.7	91.7
Set 3	90.0	80.0	85.5	83.0	84.5
Set 4	76.0	73.0	78.2	75.0	75.0

Caldwell et al. divide the pieces into four hypothetical 32-piece chess sets, depending on the size of the pieces but it was not possible to determine the original colour of the pieces. Similarly, by studying the appearance of the figures' faces, they allocated 50 of the major pieces into five groups, indicating possibly different craftsmen: (A) straight nose with flat base; (B) bulbous nose; (C) narrow nose with upturned tip; (D) short, wide face; (E) flat profile nose with prominent nostrils.

The discs, which are all held by the British Museum, are considered to be game pieces, variously described as "draughts-pieces" or "tables-men" – tables was a predecessor board game to backgammon and draughts

== See also ==
- Clonard chess piece

== Sources ==
- Boehm, Barbara Drake (29 December 2011). "Horsing Around". Exhibitions: The Games of Kings. Metropolitan Museum of Art.
- Brown, Nancy Marie (1 September 2015). Ivory Vikings: The Mystery of the Most Famous Chessmen in the World and the Woman Who Made Them. St. Martin's Publishing Group. ISBN 978-1-4668-7913-3.
- Caldwell, David H.; Hall, Mark A.; Wilkinson, Caroline M. (2011). The Lewis Chessmen Unmasked. National Museums Scotland. ISBN 978-1-905267-46-0.
- Dalton, Ormonde Maddock (1909). Catalogue of the ivory carvings of the Christian era with examples of Mohammedan art and carvings in bone in the Department of British and Mediaeval Antiquities and Ethnography of the British Museum. British Museum. pp. 63–73, 324–344 – via archive.org.
- Gingell, Christabel (2006). Masterpieces of the British Museum: The Lewis Chessmen (TV programme). narrated by Daniel Evans. Fulmar Television & Film for BBC.
- Madden, Frederic (1832). "VII Historical Remarks on the introduction of the game of Chess into Europe, and on the ancient Chess-men discovered in the Isle of Lewis". Archaeologia: Or, Miscellaneous Tracts Relating to Antiquity. 24. Society of Antiquaries of London: 203–291 – via archive.org. – reprinted in Madden, Frederic (1841). Staunton, Howard (ed.). Chess Player's Chronicle, volume I. R. Hastings. pp. 124–128, 141–144, 157–160, 173–176, 186–192, 203–208, 219–224, 236–240, 252–256, 268–272, 285–288, 299–304, 317–320.
- McClain, Dylan Loeb; Robinson, James; Little, Charles T. (4 March 2012). The Game of Kings: Medieval Ivory Chessmen from the Isle of Lewis. Sunday at the Met (conference video). Boehm, Barbara Drake (chair). Metropolitan Museum of Art. (McClain "Art and Evolution of Chess" 0:01:47–0:40:45, Robinson "Made for Laughs?" 0:41:22–1:19:20, Little "Playing Games in the Middle Ages" 1:19:30–2:10:11)
- NMS (26 June 2019). "Lewis chess pieces". National Museums Scotland.
- Robinson, James (2004). The Lewis Chessmen. British Museum Press. ISBN 0-7141-5023-1.
- Snorri Sturluson (1844). "Heimskringla, Ynglinga saga". Chronicles of the Kings of Norway, Volume I. Translated by Laing, Samuel. Longman, Brown, Green and Longmans – via archive.org.
- Sotheby's (2019). "Attributed to The Lewis Chessmen Workshop, Probably Norwegian, Trondheim, 13th Century: a Warder". Sotheby's. Archived from the original on 30 November 2019.
- Stratford, Neil (1997). The Lewis Chessman and the Enigma of the Hoard. Trustees for the British Museum. ISBN 0-7141-0587-2.
