= Devil's bird =

Devil's bird may refer to several kinds of birds:

- The storm petrel (Hydrobatidae), especially the European storm petrel (Hydrobates pelagicus)
- The yellowhammer (Emberiza citrinella)
- The pied wagtail (Motacilla alba yarrellii)
- The Devil Bird (Sri Lankan mythological bird)
