= Night raven =

Creature in European mythology

Art of ominous tattered ravens

Night ravens (also stylized nightravens; Danish and Norwegian: nattravn; Swedish: nattramn, nattkorp; German: Nachtkrapp, Nachtrabe) are creatures of European folklore, predominantly described as raven like creatures appearing in the night. The folklore differs regionally, and night ravens may be other beings, such as undead, shapeshifted into ravens. They are sometimes used as a bugbear creature of cautionary tales, used to scare children into going to bed.

Various versions of the night raven myth exist. In some legends, the night raven is described as a giant, nocturnal raven-like bird, while others leave out any specific size. In Sweden, such may not only be shaped as ravens, but can also be skeletal beings flying around.

Legends of night ravens variously exist in Germany, Austria, Denmark, Norway, Sweden, Hungary, Poland, and Russia, among more. The raven, overall, has a mythological reputation for being an ominous bird that is often associated with evil, sudden death, further, a Messenger of Darkness.

== German folklore ==
In German folklore (German: Nachtkrapp, Nachtrabe), mainly of Southern Germany and Austria, the most common legends claim that the night raven leaves its hiding place at night to hunt. If it is seen by little children, it will abduct them into its nest and messily devour them, first ripping off their limbs and then picking out their heart. According to other legends, the night raven will merely put children in his bag and take them away.

Tales about the Wütender Nachtkrapp (German, lit. 'angry night raven') are less common. Instead of abducting children, it simply crows loudly and flutters its wings, until the children have been terrorized into silence.

The Guter Nachtkrapp (German, lit. 'good night raven') is a rare benevolent version of the night raven tale. In Burgenland myths, this bird enters the children's room and gently sings them to sleep.

In northern Germany, the night raven is described as a big and strong bird that is extremely fast in travel. Its wings are described as made of iron, which has led to it also being referred to as the 'iron bird' (German: eiserner Vogel). It is said that the bird uses its iron wings to beat those to death who have offended or imitated it.

== Nordic folklore ==
In Nordic folklore, night ravens (Danish: nattravn, Norwegian: nattravn, Swedish: nattramn), are mostly known from the southern regions of Sweden and Norway, as well as Denmark. The most basic descriptions of night ravens give the sense "night ghost", or "revenant in the shape of a raven". Some legends depict them with no eyes, which, if looked into, cause death. Such are also depicted with holes in their wings, which cause illness and disease if looked at.

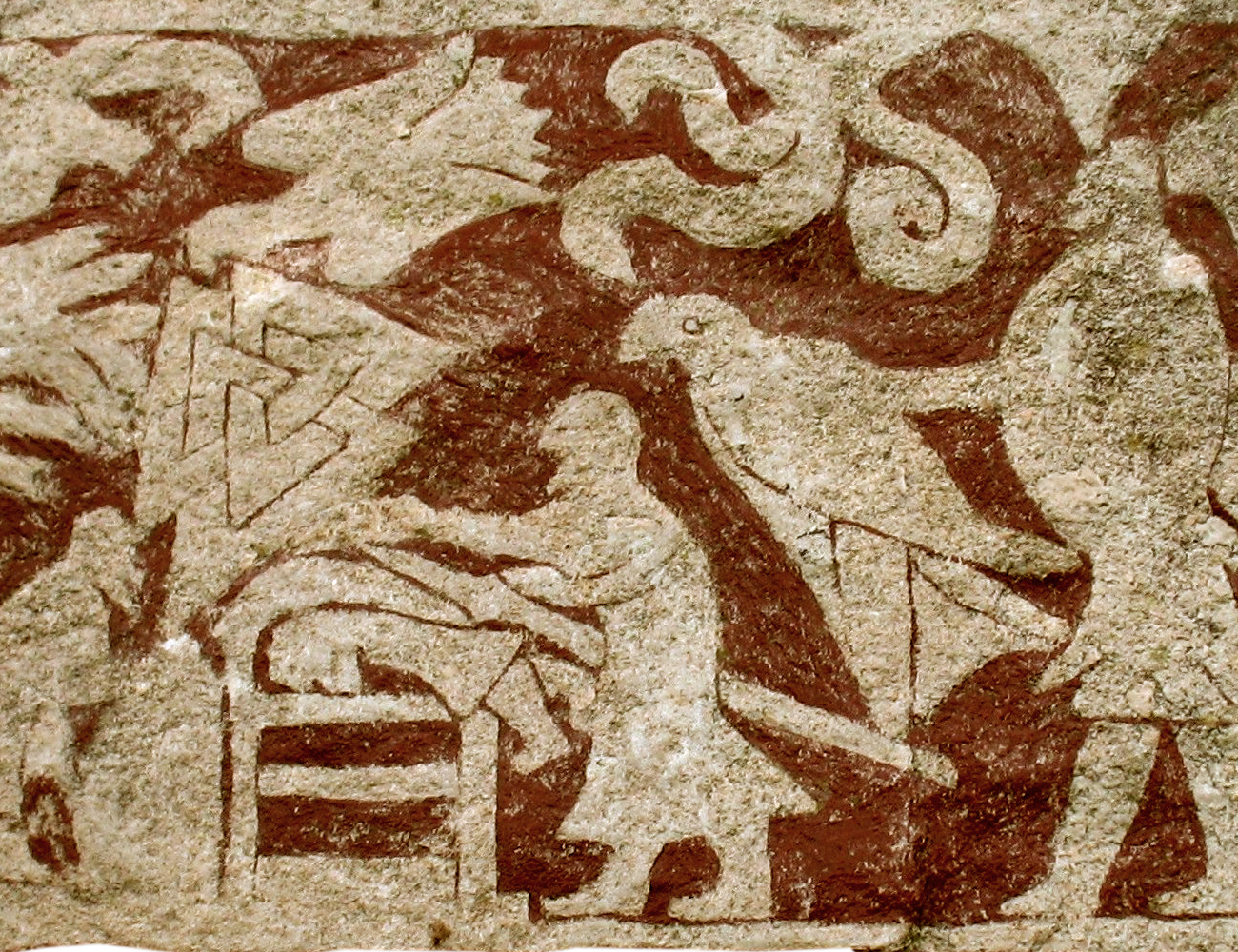
Period depiction (Stora Hammars stones) of a probable Valkyrie in raven-disguise (note the dress), overseeing some sort of sacrifice

Even in Old Norse mythology, ravens played a part in death. Valkyries, the psychopomps of Odin, when on the look for warriors to bring to Valhalla (the hall of slain warriors), scouted battlefields disguised as ravens (see Hamr (folklore)).

=== Swedish folklore ===
In Swedish folklore (nattramn, nattram, nattravn, nöttaravn, nattran; also nattkorp), especially of southern Sweden (Scania, Småland, Halland, etc), night ravens are said to be the ghosts of ungodly deceased, such as suiciders or pediciders, dead unbaptized children, those buried in unholy earth, and thereof, etc. They appear at night in feathered hamr (bird shape), and then primarily as ravens, instilling fear around it. They make a creaking sound, like the squeak of old wagon wheels, and never fly closer to the ground than the yoke of oxen.

Other Swedish records, describe night ravens as other forms of undead, with the SAOB:s entry for the variant nattkorp (Swedish: korp also meaning "raven"), describing it as a common undead (see Gengångare). An 18th century German-Swedish dictionary, translated German Poldergeist (poltergeist), as tomt-gubbe, ghost, and night raven, and a 19th-century quote, from the Swedish region of Halland, says the following:

The .. expelled dead, then fly around during the night as "night ravens", in the shape of skeletons, with a creaking, squeaking sound.

== Background ==
The origins of the night raven legends are still unknown, but a connection possibly exists to rook infestations in Central Europe. Already feared due to their black feathers and scavenging diet, the mass gatherings quickly became an existential threat to farmers and gave rooks and crows their place in folklore as all-devouring monsters.

=== Alternative senses ===
Whether related to the myth or not, the name night raven has, at least historically, not solely been used in the sense of the monster. According to the German dictionary, Deutsches Wörterbuch, and the Swedish Academy's dictionary, SAOB, the term night raven is also an older Germanic name for nocturnal birds, especially nightjars and owls (Old Norse: nátthrafn, Old Swedish: natrafn); still being the Danish (natravn), Norwegian (nattravn) and Icelandic (nátthrafn) term for nightjars. Nightjars are also called night ravens in Latin (nycticorax), which appears related to the Germanic usage.

The word nightraven (also nightcrow) was also used in English before modern times, among others, used by writers such as William Shakespeare, meaning "nocturnal bird", variously identified as "night-owl", "night-heron" and "nightjar".

Another sense is as a synonym for night owl, i.e., a nocturnal person; in Danish and Norwegian, the form natteravn, specifically refers to a night wanderer, a person wandering during the night to keep the neighbourhood safe (see Natteravnene). In Swedish, night raven has also been used to describe brigands.

== In popular culture ==
Johann August Apel's short story "The Fatal Marksman", from Gespensterbuch volume 1 (1810) has night-ravens flying around a magic circle of skulls and bones, while the protagonist begins to cast magic bullets.

In the mobile game Year Walk (2013), one of the Watchers is a Night Raven that steals a key. In the subsequent e-picturebook Year Walk: Bedtime Stories for Awful Children (2015), the fourth chapter is devoted to the Night Raven.

== See also ==
- Devil Bird, a similar omen in Sri Lankan folklore
- Hakawai (mythology), a similar omen in Māori mythology
