= Berserker =

Old Norse warrior fighting in a fury

In the Old Norse written corpus, berserkers (Old Norse: berserkir) were Scandinavian warriors who were said to have fought in a trance-like fury, a characteristic which later gave rise to the modern English adjective berserk 'furiously violent or out of control'. Berserkers are attested to in numerous Old Norse sources.

== Etymology ==
Berserker / Ulfheðinn

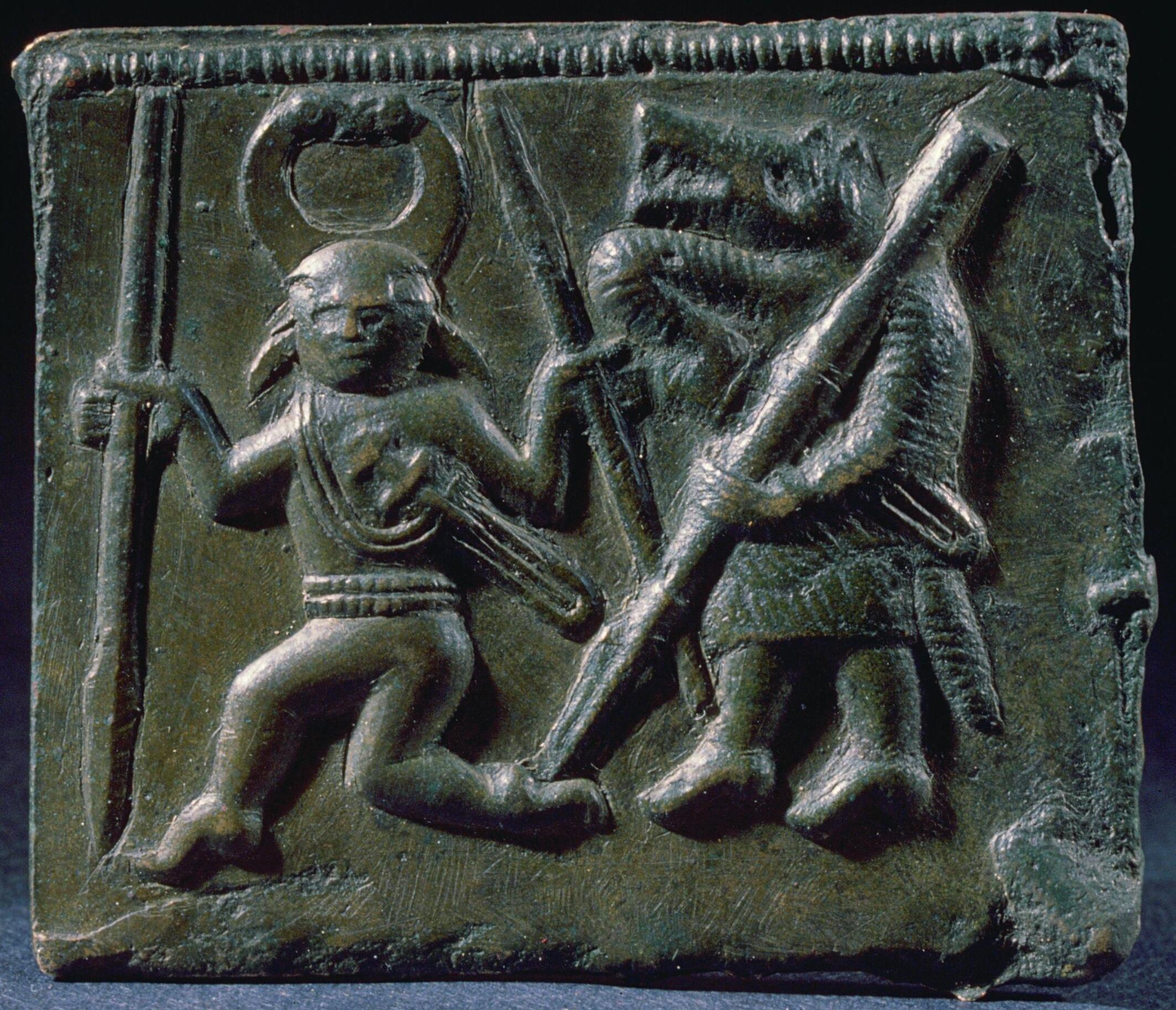
Artifact

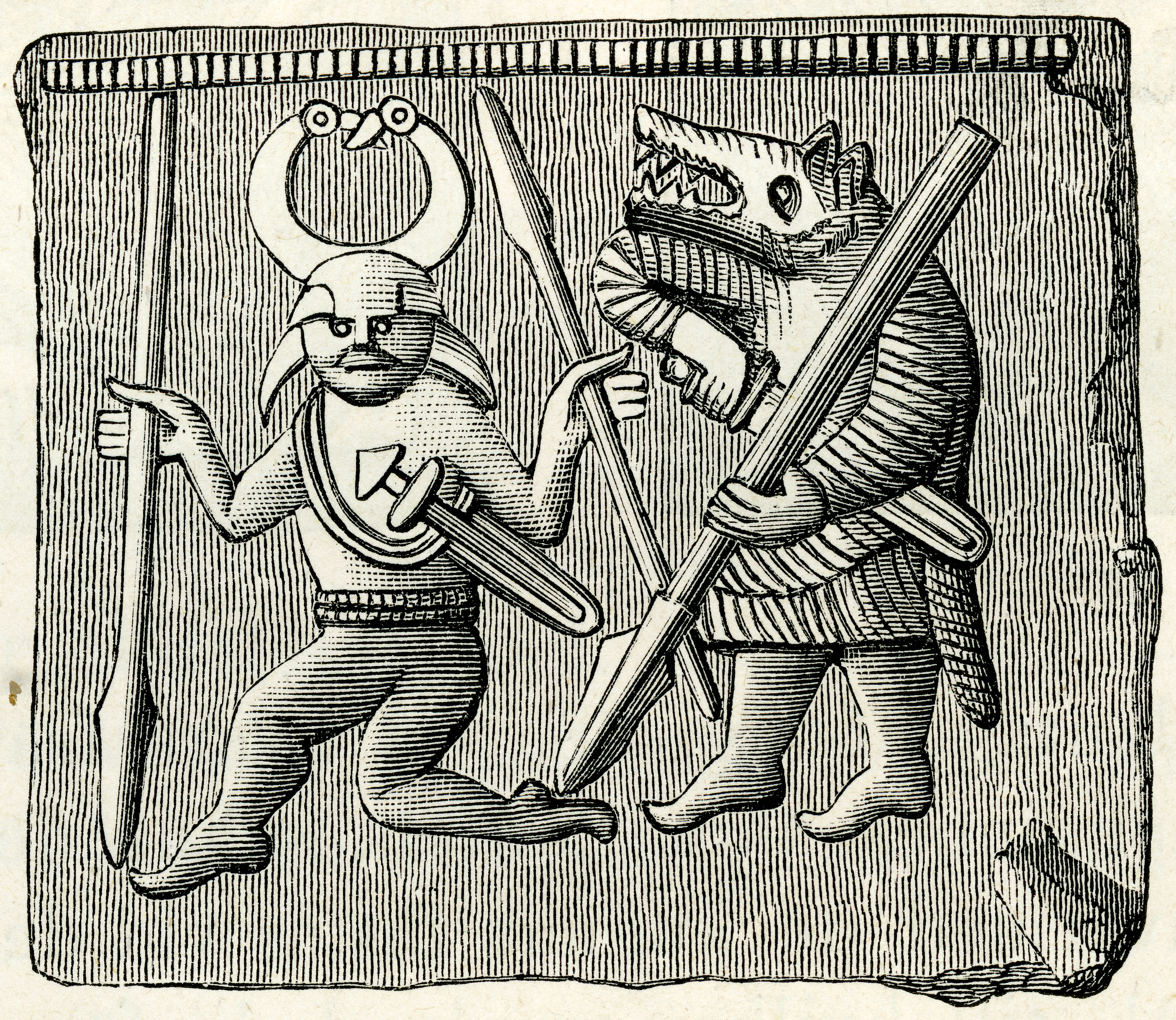
Sketch

One of the Vendel era Torslunda plates found on Öland, Sweden. It probably depicts one-eyed Odin guiding a berserker or ulfheðinn (wolf-warrior).

The Old Norse form of the word was berserkr (plural berserkir), a compound word of ber and serkr. The second part, serkr, means 'shirt' (see serk). The first part, ber, on the other hand, can mean several things, but is assumed to have most likely meant 'bear', with the full word, berserkr, meaning just 'bear-shirt', as in 'someone who wears a coat made out of a bear's skin'.

The thirteenth-century historian Snorri Sturluson, an Icelander who lived around 200 years after berserkers were outlawed in Iceland in 1015, on the other hand, interpreted the meaning as 'bare-shirt', that is to say that the warriors went into battle without armour, but that view has largely been abandoned as a result of contradicting and lack of supporting evidence.

== Early beginnings ==
It is proposed by some authors that the northern warrior tradition originated from hunting magic. Three main animal cults appear to have developed: the cult of the bear, the wolf, and the wild boar.

=== Germanic mercenaries in the Roman army ===
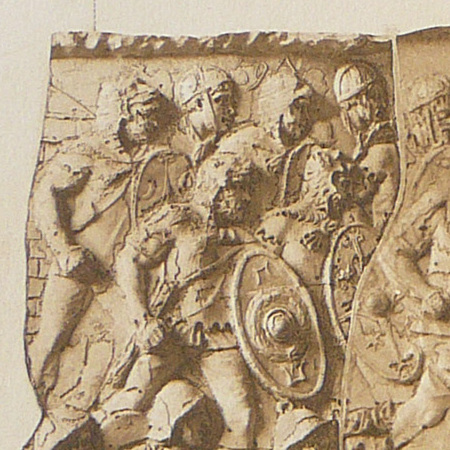
Bearhooded Germanic warriors on Trajan's Column

The bas-relief carvings on Trajan's Column in Rome, completed in 113 AD, depict scenes of Trajan's conquest of Dacia in 101–106 AD. The scenes show his Roman soldiers plus auxiliaries and allies from Rome's border regions, including tribal warriors from both sides of the Rhine. There are warriors depicted as barefoot, bare-chested, bearing weapons and helmets that are associated with the Germani.

Scene 36 on the column shows some of these warriors standing together, with some wearing bearhoods and some wearing wolfhoods. This is the only potential record of Germanic bear-warriors and wolf-warriors fighting together until 872 AD, with Thórbiörn Hornklofi's description of the battle of Hafrsfjord, when they fought together for King Harald Fairhair of Norway.

=== Migration Period depictions ===
In 1639 and 1734 respectively, two extensively decorated horns made of sheet gold, the Golden Horns of Gallehus, were discovered in Southern Jutland, Denmark. As part of its decoration, the first horn, the larger of the two, depicts two animal headed men facing each other, armed with what appears to be a sickle and a wood-splitting axe. Dated to the early 5th century, these depictions could represent something related to berserkers.

In the spring of 1870, four Vendel era cast-bronze dies, the Torslunda plates, were found by Erik Gustaf Pettersson and Anders Petter Nilsson in a cairn on the lands of the farm No 5 Björnhovda in Torslunda parish, Öland, Sweden, one of them showing what appears to be a berserker ritual.

In 1887, the graves of two 7th century Alemanni men were found during construction work in the immediate vicinity of the St. Gallus Church in the Gutenstein district of the city of Sigmaringen, Germany. One of the graves contained, among other things, a silver sword scabbard, the Gutenstein scabbard. Highly ornate, it features a warrior figure with a wolf's head, holding a sword and a spear. It is thought this depicts an ulfheðinn (wolf warrior), as pre-Christian Central Europe was part of the same tradition as the Norse.

Other animal headed figures have been found, such as an antlered figure on the Gundestrup cauldron, found on northern Jutland, Denmark, in 1891, which has been dated from 200 BC to 300 AD.

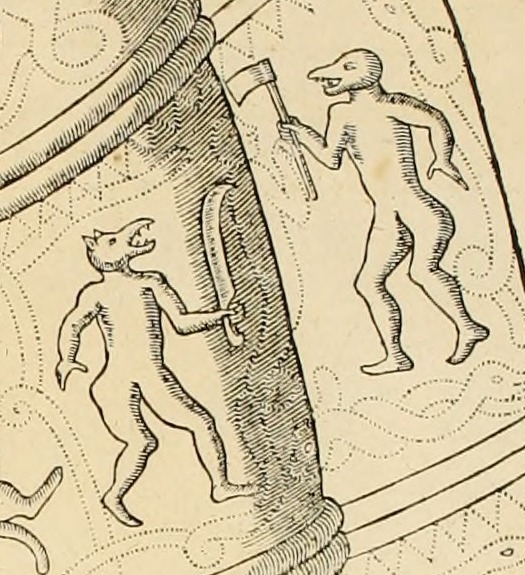
Animal headed warriors on the Gallehus horns.

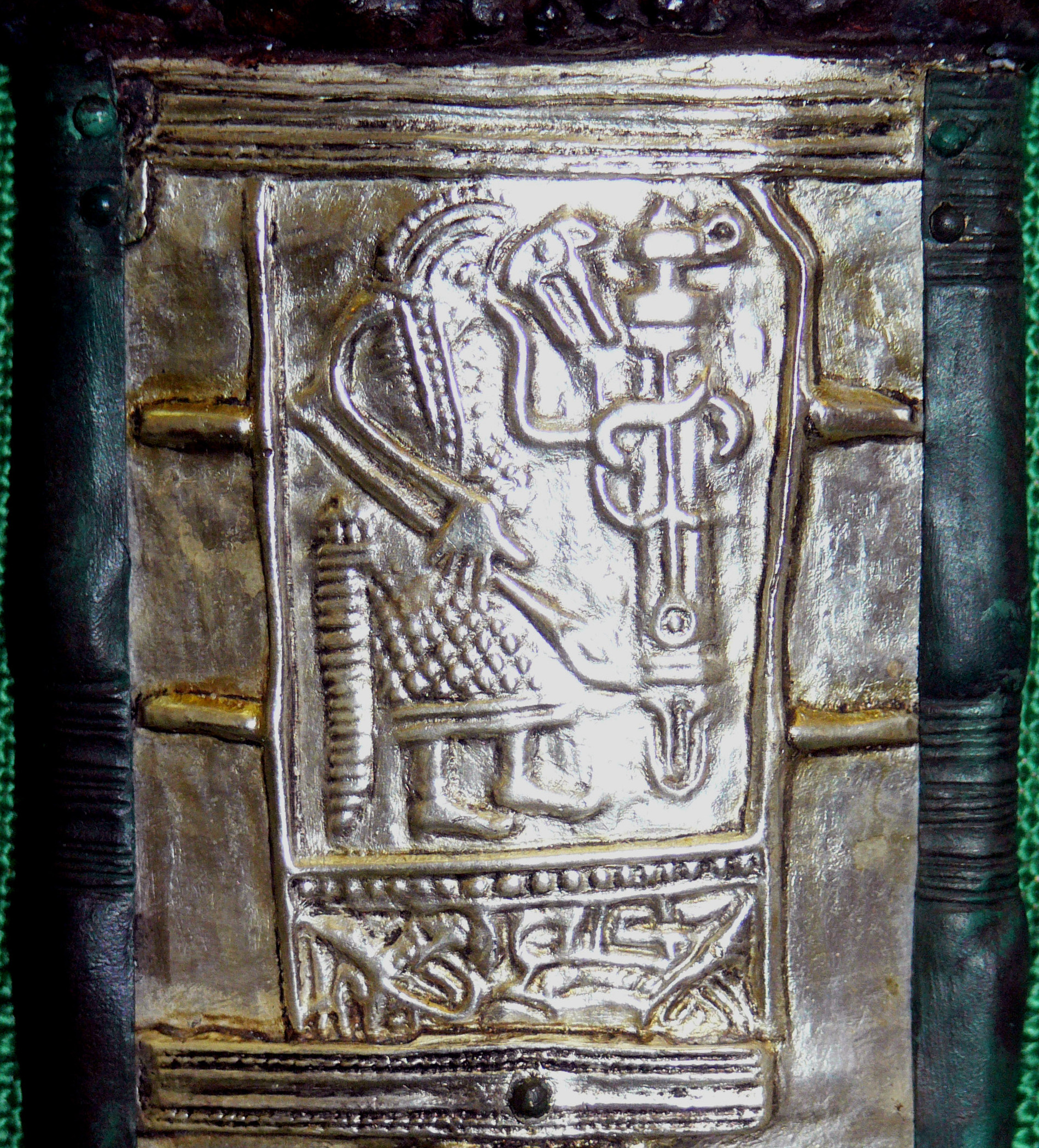
A wolf headed warrior on the Gutenstein scabbard.

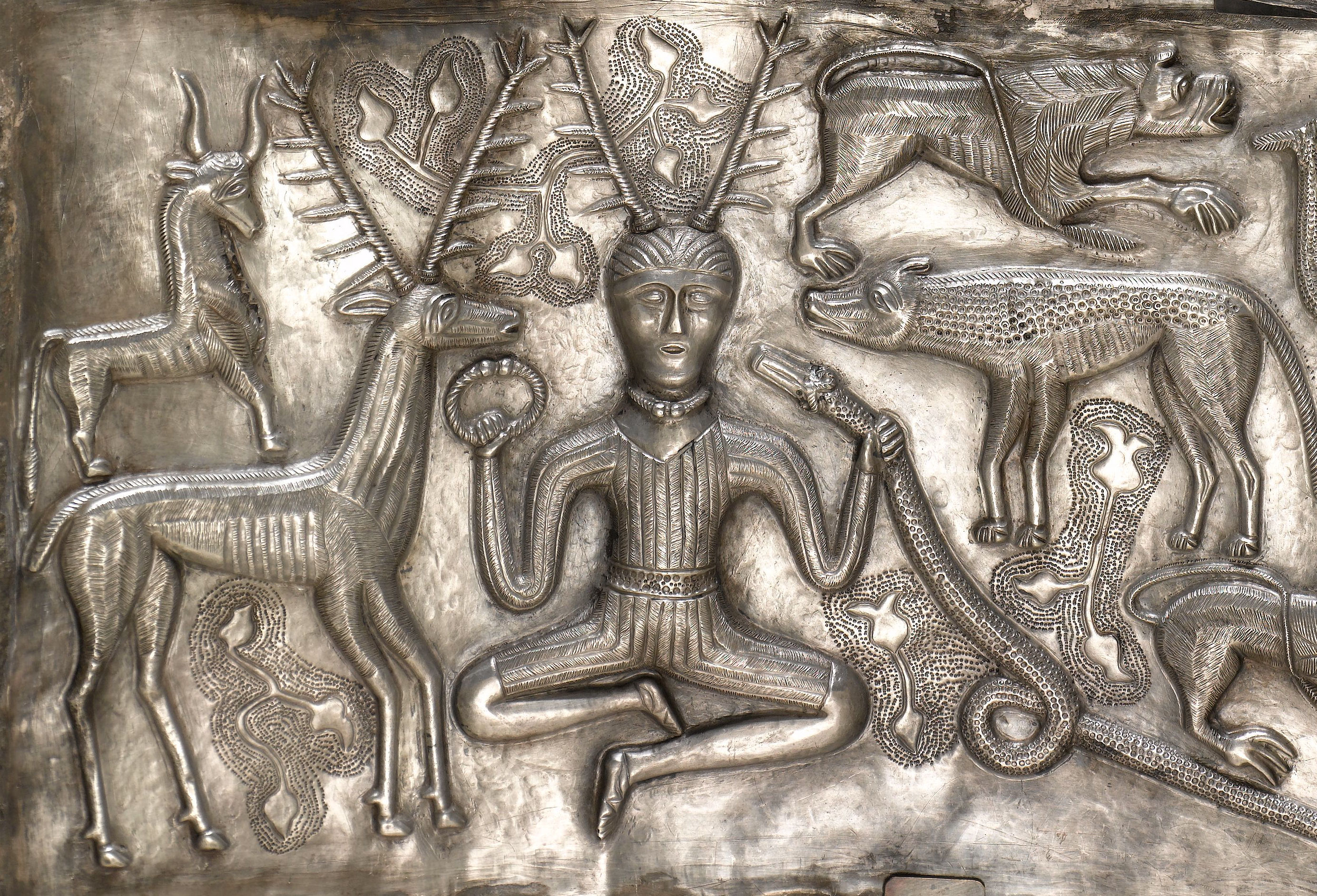
An antlered figure on the Gundestrup cauldron.

== Types ==
=== Berserkers – bear warriors ===
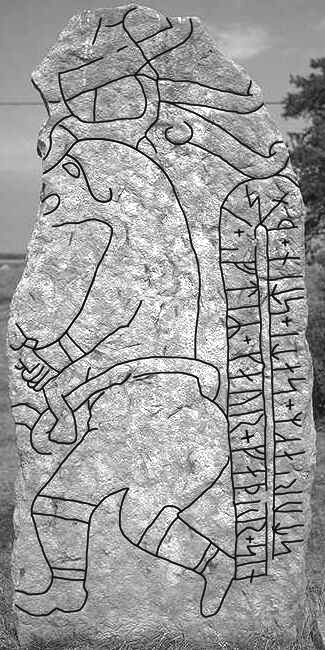
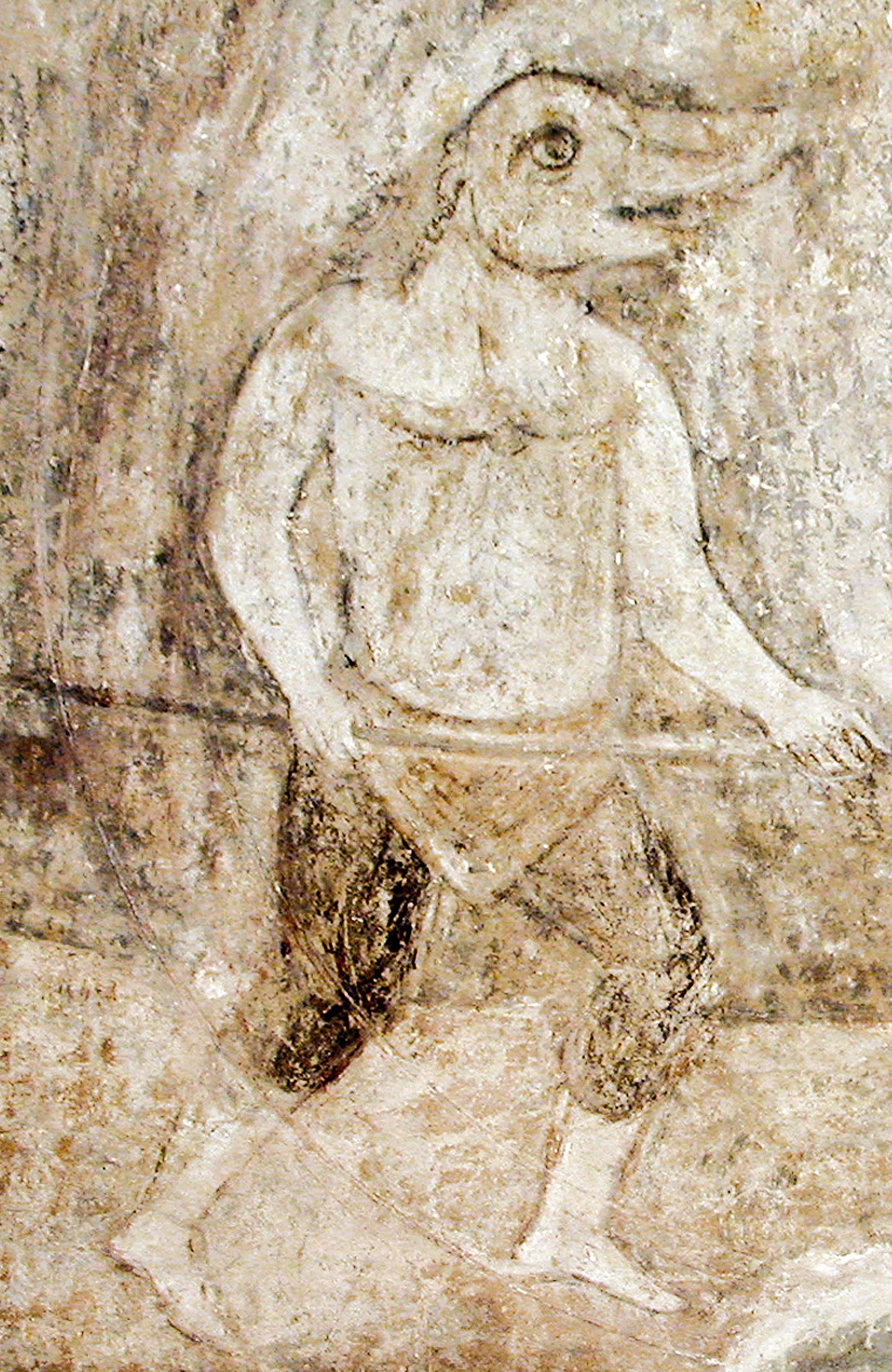
- Left image: Vg 56 runestone from Västergötland, Sweden, possibly depicting a berserker in animal skin.
- Right image: Possible Varangians berserker ritual painted in the 11th c. Saint Sophia Cathedral, Kyiv.

It is proposed by some authors that the berserkers drew their power from the bear and were devoted to the bear cult, which was once widespread across the northern hemisphere. The berserkers maintained their religious observances despite their fighting prowess, as the Svarfdæla saga tells of a challenge to single-combat that was postponed by a berserker until three days after Yule. The bodies of dead berserkers were laid out in bearskins prior to their funeral rites. In battle, the berserkers were subject to fits of frenzy. They would howl like wild beasts, foam at the mouth, and gnaw the rims of their shields. According to belief, during these fits, they were immune to steel and fire, and made great havoc in the ranks of the enemy. When this fever abated, they were weak and tame. Accounts can be found in the sagas.

To "go berserk" was to "hamask", which translates as "change form", in this case, as with the sense "enter a state of wild fury". Some scholars have interpreted those who could transform as a berserker as "hamrammr" or "shapestrong" – literally able to shapeshift into a bear's form. For example, the band of men who go with Skallagrim in Egil's Saga to see King Harald about his brother Thorolf's murder are described as "the hardest of men, with a touch of the uncanny about a number of them ... they [were] built and shaped more like trolls than human beings." This has sometimes been interpreted as the band of men being "hamrammr", though there is no major consensus.

Another example of "hamrammr" comes from the Saga of Hrólf Kraki. One tale within tells the story of Bödvar Bjarki, a berserker who is able to shapeshift into a bear and uses this ability to fight for king Hrólfr Kraki. "Men saw that a great bear went before King Hrolf's men, keeping always near the king. He slew more men with his fore paws than any five of the king's champions."

=== Ulfheðnar – wolf warriors ===
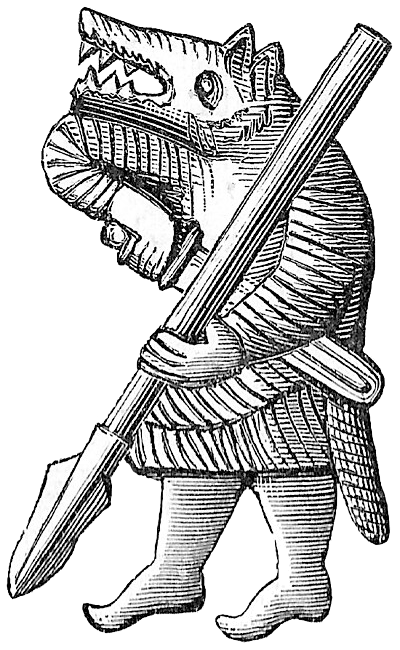
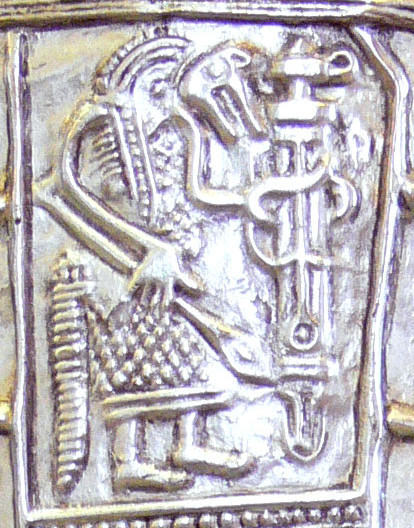
- Left image: Probable Ulfheðinn on one of the Torslunda plates.
- Right image: Possible ulfheðinn on the Gutenstein scabbard (replica).

Wolf warriors appear among the legends of the Indo-Europeans, Turks, Mongols, and Native American cultures. The Germanic wolf-warriors have left their trace through shields and standards that were captured by the Romans and displayed in the armilustrium in Rome.

Frenzy warriors wearing the skins of wolves called ulfheðnar ("wolf-skin-ers" or possibly "wolf-heathens"; singular ulfheðinn), are mentioned in the Vatnsdæla saga, the Haraldskvæði and the Grettis saga and are consistently referred to in the sagas as a group of berserkers, always presented as the elite following of the first Norwegian king Harald Fairhair. They were said to wear the pelt of a wolf over their chainmail when they entered battle. Unlike berserkers, direct references to ulfheðnar are scant.

Egil's Saga features a man called Kveldulf (Evening-Wolf) who is said to have transformed into a wolf at night. This Kveldulf is described as a berserker, as opposed to an ulfheðinn. Ulfheðnar are sometimes described as Odin's special warriors: "[Odin's] men went without their mailcoats and were mad as hounds or wolves, bit their shields...they slew men, but neither fire nor iron had effect upon them. This is called 'going berserk'."

The helm-plate press from Torslunda depicts a scene of a one-eyed warrior with bird-horned helm, assumed to be Odin, next to a wolf-headed warrior armed with a spear and sword as distinguishing features, assumed to be a berserker with a wolf pelt: "a wolf-skinned warrior with the apparently one-eyed dancer in the bird-horned helm, which is generally interpreted as showing a scene indicative of a relationship between berserkgang ... and the god Odin".

=== "Jǫfurr" – proposed boar warriors ===
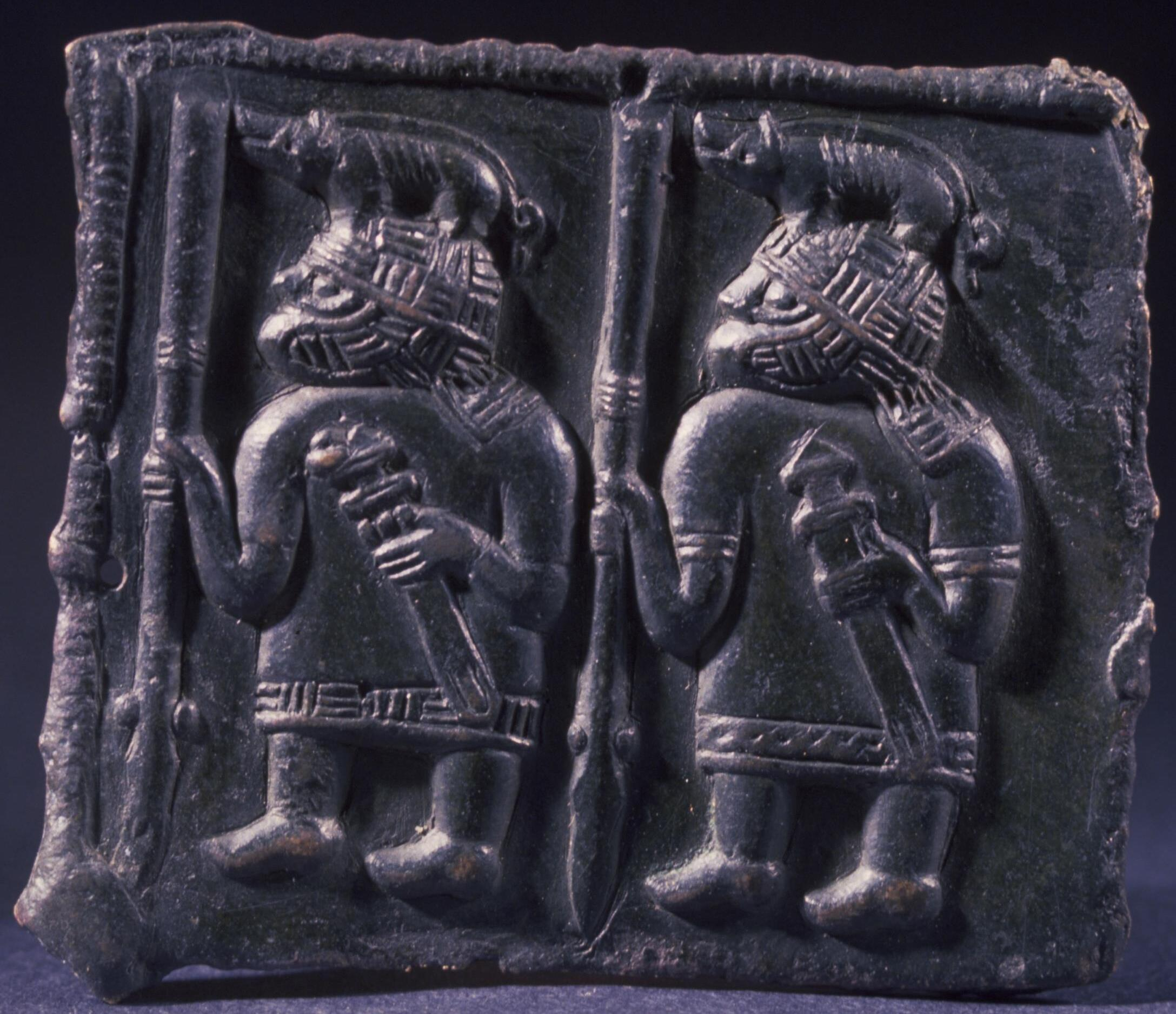
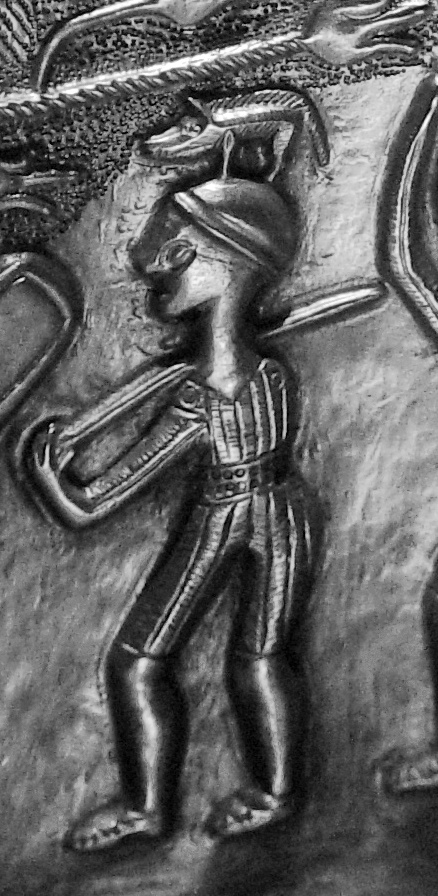
- Left image: Warriors with boar crested helmets on one of the Torslunda plates.
- Right image: Warrior with boar crested helmet on the Gundestrup cauldron.

In Norse poetry, the word jǫfurr, which originally meant "wild boar", is used metaphorically for "a prince, monarch or warrior", which probably stems from the custom of wearing boar's heads as helmets or boar crested helmets in battle.

Swine played a central role in Germanic paganism, featuring in both mythology and religious practice, particularly in association with the Vanir, Freyr and Freyja. It has been proposed that similar to berserkers, warriors could ritually transform into boars so as to gain strength, bravery and protection in battle. It has been theorised that this process was linked to the wearing of boar helmets as a ritual costume.

== Attestations ==
Berserkers appear prominently in a multitude of other sagas and poems. Many earlier sagas portrayed berserkers as bodyguards, elite soldiers, and champions of kings. This image would change as time passed and sagas would begin to describe berserkers as boasters rather than heroes, and as ravenous men who loot, plunder, and kill indiscriminately. Within the sagas, Berserkers can be narrowed down to four different types. The King's Berserkr, the Hall-Challenging Berserkr, the Hólmgangumaðr, and the Viking Berserkr. Later, by Christian interpreters, the berserker was viewed as a "heathen devil".

The earliest surviving reference to the term "berserker" is in Haraldskvæði, a skaldic poem composed by Thórbiörn Hornklofi in the late 9th century in honor of King Harald Fairhair, as ulfheðnar ("men clad in wolf skins"). This translation from the Haraldskvæði saga describes Harald's berserkers:

I'll ask of the berserks, you tasters of blood,
Those intrepid heroes, how are they treated,
Those who wade out into battle?
Wolf-skinned they are called. In battle
They bear bloody shields.
Red with blood are their spears when they come to fight.
They form a closed group.
The prince in his wisdom puts trust in such men
Who hack through enemy shields.

The "tasters of blood" (a kenning) in this passage are thought to be ravens, which feasted on the slain.

The Icelandic historian and poet Snorri Sturluson (1179–1241) wrote the following description of berserkers in his Ynglinga saga:

His (Odin's) men rushed forwards without armour, were as mad as dogs or wolves, bit their shields, and were strong as bears or wild oxen, and killed people at a blow, but neither fire nor iron told upon them. This was called Berserkergang.

King Harald Fairhair's use of berserkers as "shock troops" broadened his sphere of influence. Other Scandinavian kings used berserkers as part of their army of hirdmen and sometimes ranked them as equivalent to a royal bodyguard. It may be that some of those warriors only adopted the organization or rituals of berserk Männerbünde, or used the name as a deterrent or claim of their ferocity.

Emphasis has been placed on the frenzied nature of the berserkers, hence the modern sense of the word "berserk". However, the sources describe several other characteristics that have been ignored or neglected by modern commentators. Snorri's assertion that "neither fire nor iron told upon them" is reiterated time after time. The sources frequently state that neither edged weapons nor fire affected the berserks, although they were not immune to clubs or other blunt instruments. For example:

These men asked Halfdan to attack Hardbeen and his champions man by man; and he not only promised to fight, but assured himself the victory with most confident words. When Hardbeen heard this, a demoniacal frenzy suddenly took him; he furiously bit and devoured the edges of his shield; he kept gulping down fiery coals; he snatched live embers in his mouth and let them pass down into his entrails; he rushed through the perils of crackling fires; and at last, when he had raved through every sort of madness, he turned his sword with raging hand against the hearts of six of his champions. It is doubtful whether this madness came from thirst for battle or natural ferocity. Then with the remaining band of his champions he attacked Halfdan, who crushed him with a hammer of wondrous size, so that he lost both victory and life; paying the penalty both to Halfdan, whom he had challenged, and to the kings whose offspring he had violently ravished...

Similarly, Hrolf Kraki's champions refuse to retreat "from fire or iron". Another frequent motif refers to berserkers blunting their enemy's blades with spells or a glance from their evil eyes. This appears as early as Beowulf where it is a characteristic attributed to Grendel. Both the fire eating and the immunity to edged weapons are reminiscent of tricks popularly ascribed to fakirs. In 1015, Jarl Eiríkr Hákonarson of Norway outlawed berserkers. Grágás, the medieval Icelandic law code, sentenced berserker warriors to outlawry. By the 12th century, organised berserker war-bands had disappeared.

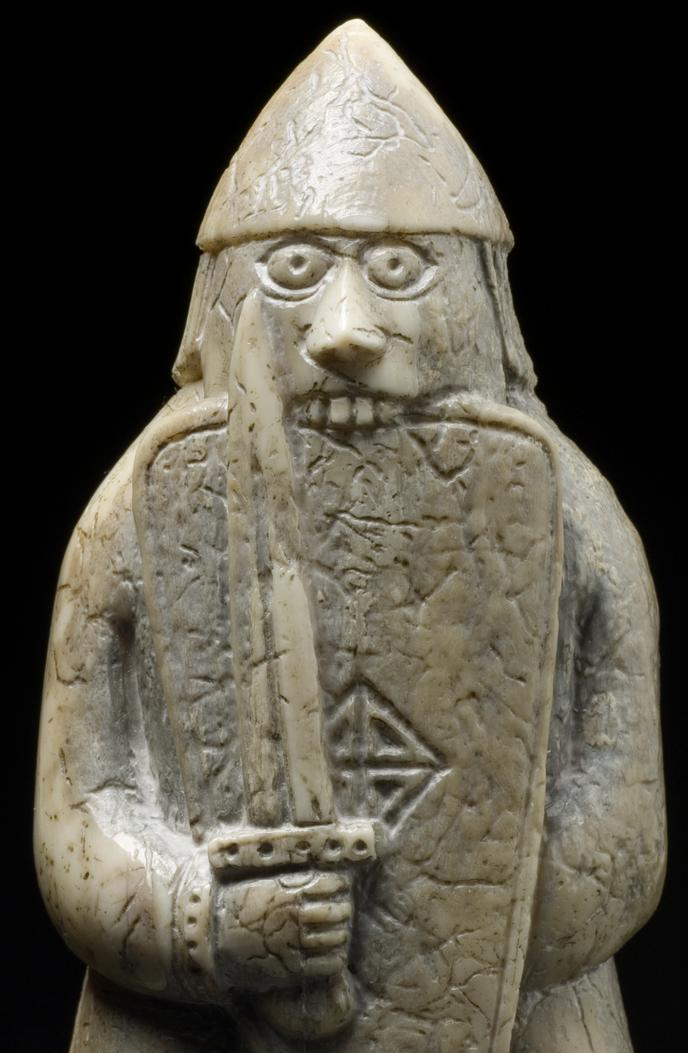
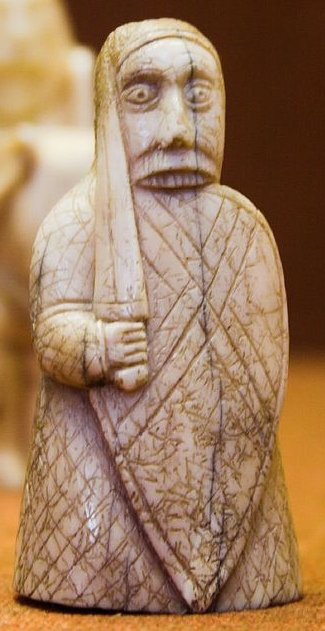
Different rook pieces from the Lewis chessmen, depicted as a warrior biting his shield.

The Lewis Chessmen, found on the Isle of Lewis, Outer Hebrides, Scotland, and thought to be of Norse manufacture, include berserkers depicted biting their shields.

== Theories ==
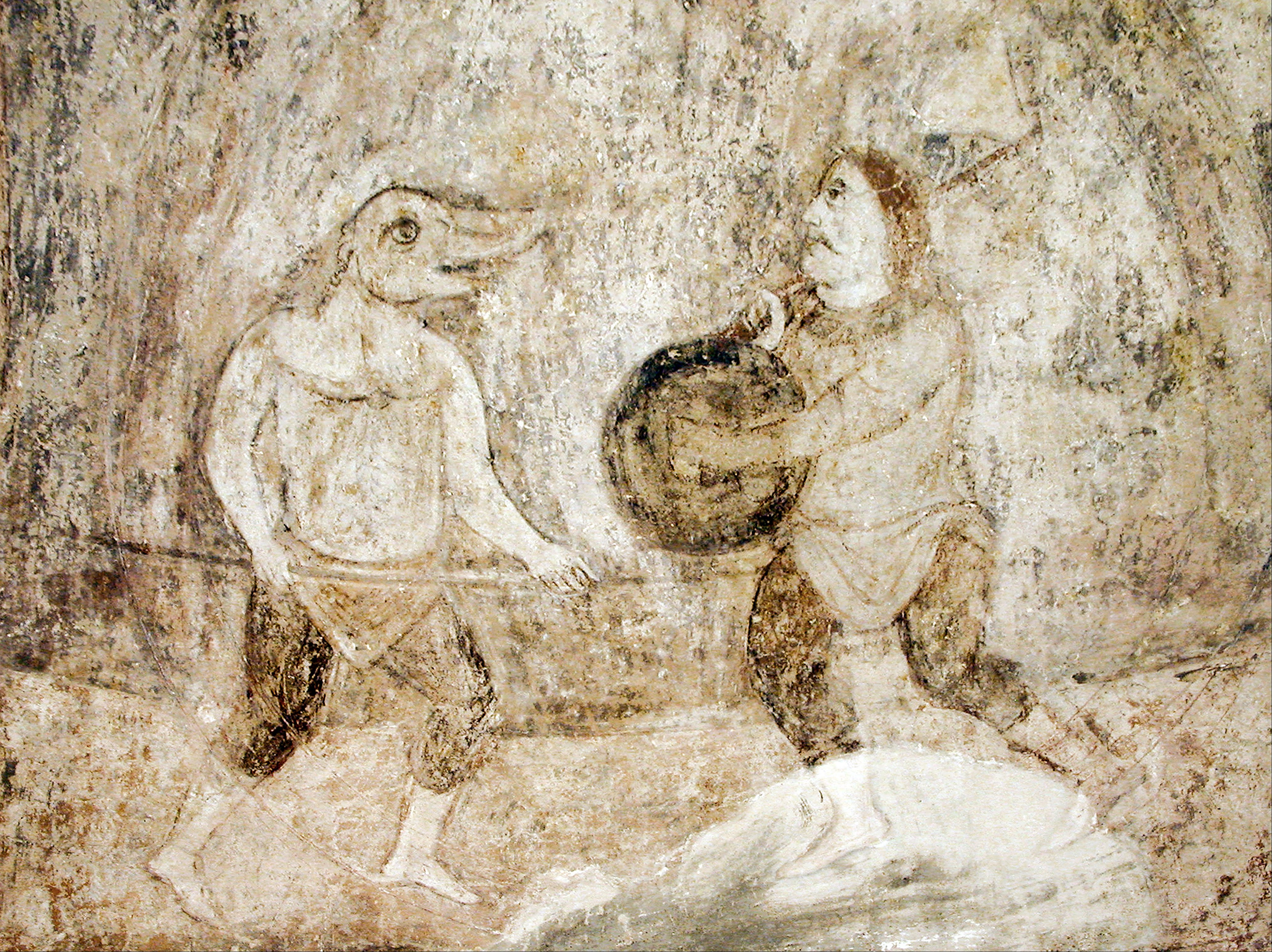
A fresco in the 11th c. Saint Sophia Cathedral, Kyiv that appears to depict a berserker ritual performed by Varangians (Scandinavians)

Scholar Hilda Ellis-Davidson draws a parallel between berserkers and the mention by the Byzantine emperor Constantine VII (AD 905–959) in his book De cerimoniis aulae byzantinae ("Book of Ceremonies of the Byzantine court") of a "Gothic Dance" performed by members of his Varangian Guard, Norse warriors in the service of the Byzantine Empire, who took part wearing animal skins and masks: she believes this may have been connected with berserker rites.

The rage the berserker experienced was referred to as berserkergang ('berserk fit/frenzy' or 'berserk movement'). This condition has been described as follows:

This fury, which was called berserkergang, occurred not only in the heat of battle, but also during laborious work. Men who were thus seized performed things which otherwise seemed impossible for human power. This condition is said to have begun with shivering, chattering of the teeth, and chill in the body, and then the face swelled and changed its colour. With this was connected a great hot-headedness, which at last gave over into a great rage, under which they howled as wild animals, bit the edge of their shields, and cut down everything they met without discriminating between friend or foe. When this condition ceased, a great dulling of the mind and feebleness followed, which could last for one or several days.

Some scholars propose that certain examples of berserker rage had been induced voluntarily by the consumption of drugs such as hallucinogenic mushrooms, massive amounts of alcohol, or a mixture only known as 'butotens.' This is much debated but the theory is further supported by the discovery of seeds belonging to black henbane (Hyoscyamus niger) in a Viking grave that was unearthed near Fyrkat, Denmark in 1977. An analysis of the symptoms caused by Hyoscyamus niger revealed that they are also similar to the symptoms ascribed to the berserker state, which suggest it may have been used to generate their warlike mood. Other explanations for the berserker's madness that have been put forward include self-induced hysteria, epilepsy, or mental illness, among other causes.

One theory of the berserkers suggests that the physical manifestations of the berserker alongside their rage was a form of self-induced hysteria. Initiated before battle through a ritualistic performance meant for effect, which included actions such as shield-biting and animalistic howling.

Jonathan Shay makes an explicit connection between the berserker rage of soldiers and the hyperarousal of posttraumatic stress disorder. In Achilles in Vietnam, he writes:

If a soldier survives the berserk state, it imparts emotional deadness and vulnerability to explosive rage to his psychology and permanent hyperarousal to his physiology — hallmarks of post-traumatic stress disorder in combat veterans. My clinical experience with Vietnam combat veterans prompts me to place the berserk state at the heart of their most severe psychological and psychophysiological injuries.

It has been suggested that the berserkers' behavior inspired the legend of the werewolf.

== In popular culture ==
- J. R. R. Tolkien draws heavily on Norse mythology in his Middle Earth tales, including The Hobbit. There, the berserker Beorn can transfigure into a massive bear, dangerous to both friend and foe.
- Thor Odinson has been depicted with a berserker rage like state called "Warrior's Madness" which enhances his strength, speed, durability and stamina for months though Thor has very little control in this state. A 'Berserker staff' is featured in the Marvel TV show Agents of S.H.I.E.L.D..

== Speculative recreations gallery ==
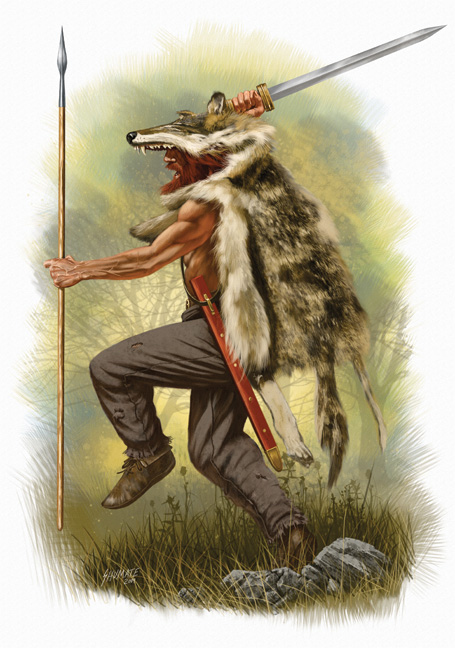
Speculative úlfheðinn (wolf warrior).

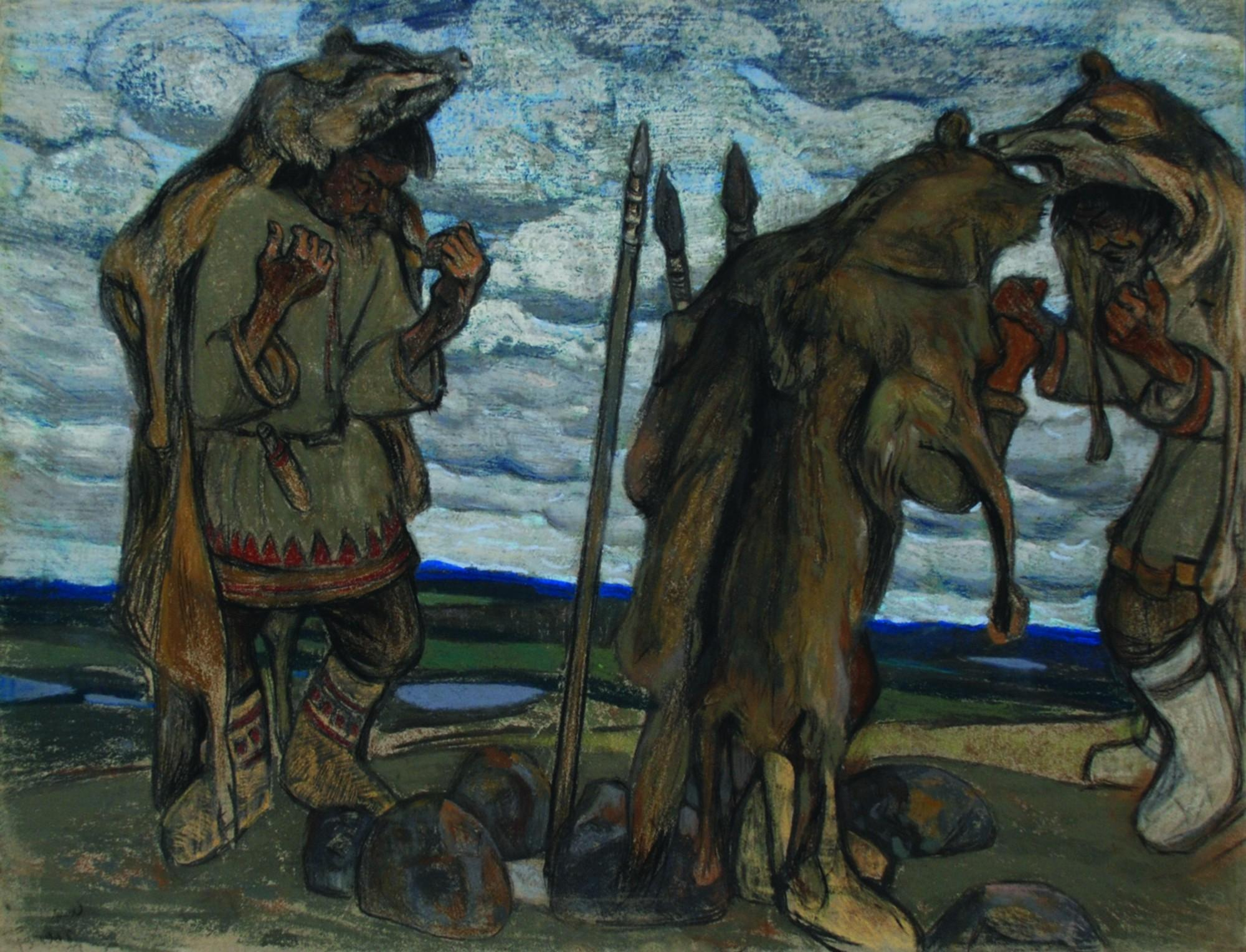
Sorcerers by Nicholas K. Roerich, which depicts ulfheðnar performing a ritual.

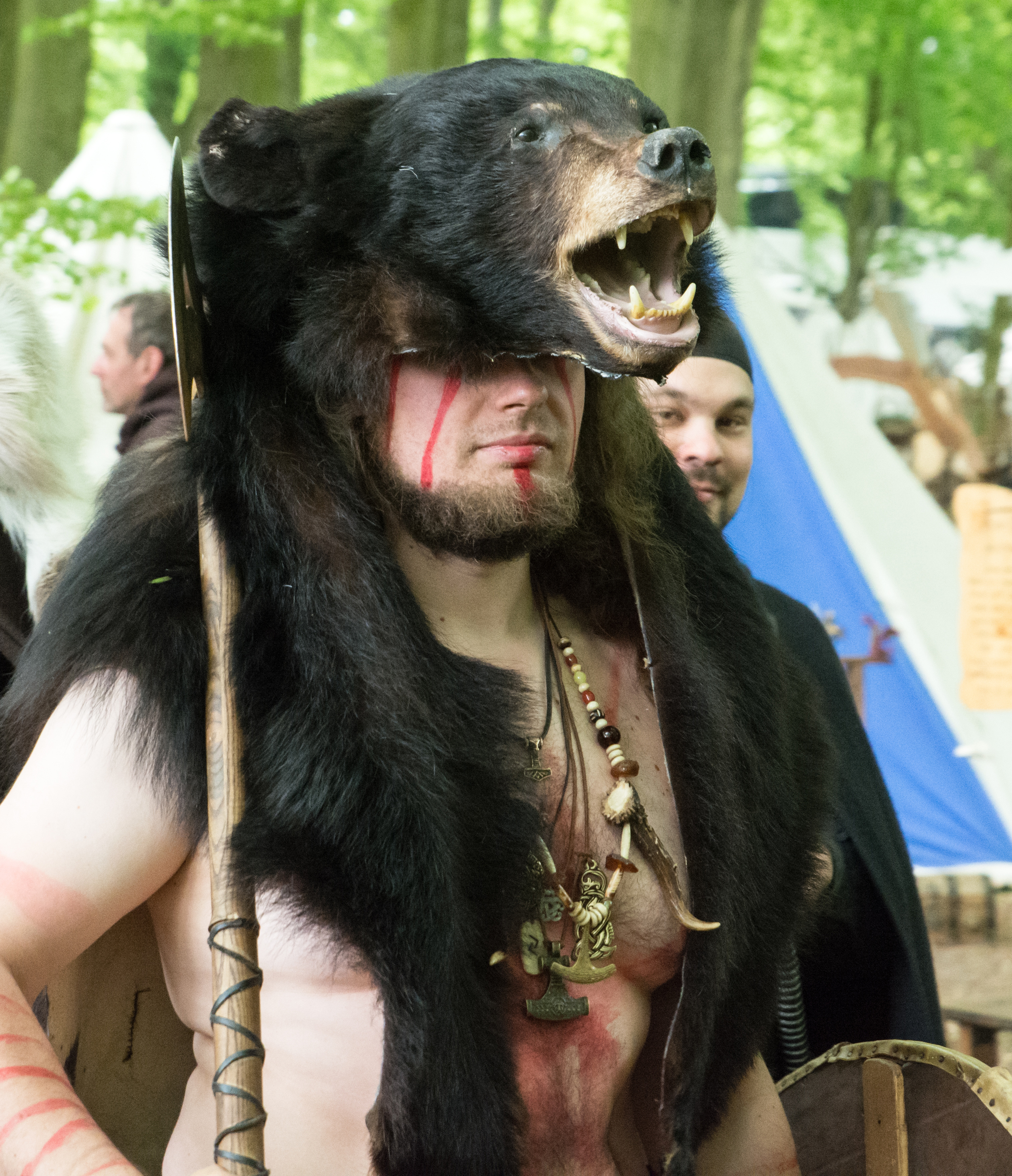
Speculative ceremonial dress by a modern berserker reenactor.

== See also ==
- Amok syndrome
- Barbarian
- Kóryos, theoretical Proto-Indo-European brotherhood of warriors, wearing animal skins to assume the nature of wolves or dogs
- Furor Teutonicus
- Fianna

== Bibliography ==
- Beck, H. (1965). Das Ebersignum im Germanischen. Ein Beitrag zur germanischen Tiersymbolik. Berlin: W. de Gruyter.
- Kershaw, Priscilla K. (1997). The One-eyed God : Odin and the (Indo-)Germanic Männerbünde. Monograph Series. Vol. 36. Journal of Indo-European Studies. ISBN 978-0941694742. Archived from the original on 11 July 2023.
- Speidel, Michael P. (2002). "Berserks: A History of Indo-European Mad Warriors". Journal of World History. 13 (2): 253–290. ISSN 1045-6007. JSTOR 20078974.
- Speidel, Michael P (2004), Ancient Germanic Warriors: Warrior Styles from Trajan's Column to Icelandic Sagas, London: Routledge, ISBN 978-0415486828
- Price, Neil (2019). The Viking Way, Magic and Mind in Late Iron Age Scandinavia (2 ed.). Oxbow Books, Oxford and Philadelphia. ISBN 9781842172605.
- Simek, Rudolf (1995), Lexikon der germanischen Mythologie, Stuttgart: Alfred Kröner, ISBN 978-3-520-36802-7
- Merkelbach, Rebecca. 2018. Eigi í mannligu eðli: Shape, Monstrosity and Berserkism in the Sagas of Icelanders. Shapeshifters in Medieval North Atlantic Literature, Santiago Francisco Barreiro and Luciana Mabel Cordo Russo, eds., 83–106. Amsterdam University Press.
