= Främmestad =

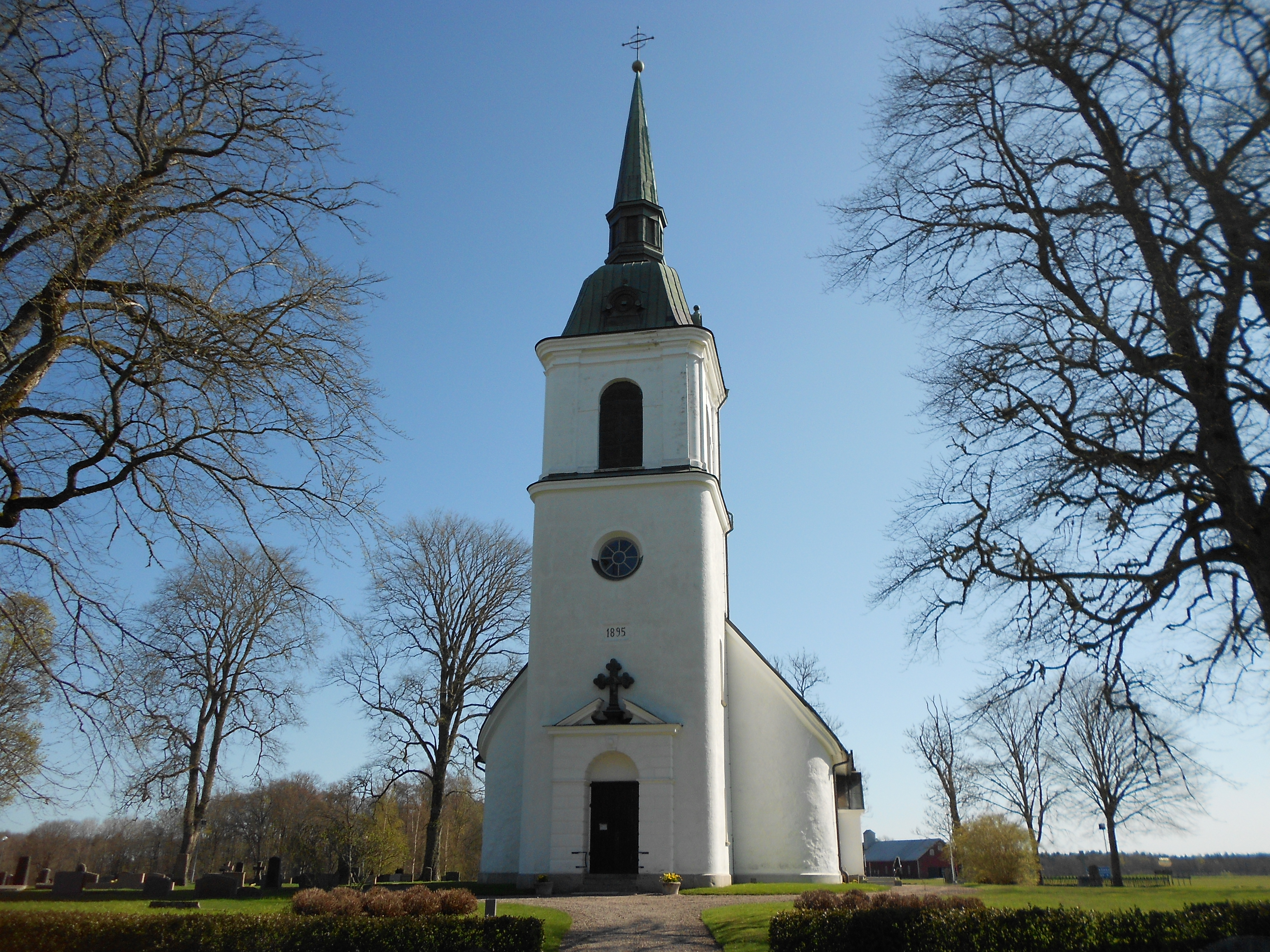
- Främmestad Church

- Location within Västra Götaland Location within Sweden
- Coordinates: 58°15′N 12°41′E
- Country: Sweden
- Province: Västergötland
- County: Västra Götaland County
- Municipality: Essunga Municipality

Area
  - Total: 0.51 km^{2} (0.20 sq mi)

Population (31 December 2010)
  - Total: 393
  - Density: 773/km^{2} (2,000/sq mi)
- Time zone: UTC+1 (CET)
  - Summer (DST): UTC+2 (CEST)

Främmestad is a locality situated in Essunga Municipality, Västra Götaland County, Sweden. It had 393 inhabitants in 2010.

Astrid Olofsdotter, daughter of Olof Skötkonung and wife of Olaf II of Norway is buried in Främmestad.
