= Die Walküre =

1870 opera by Richard Wagner

- Music drama by Richard Wagner
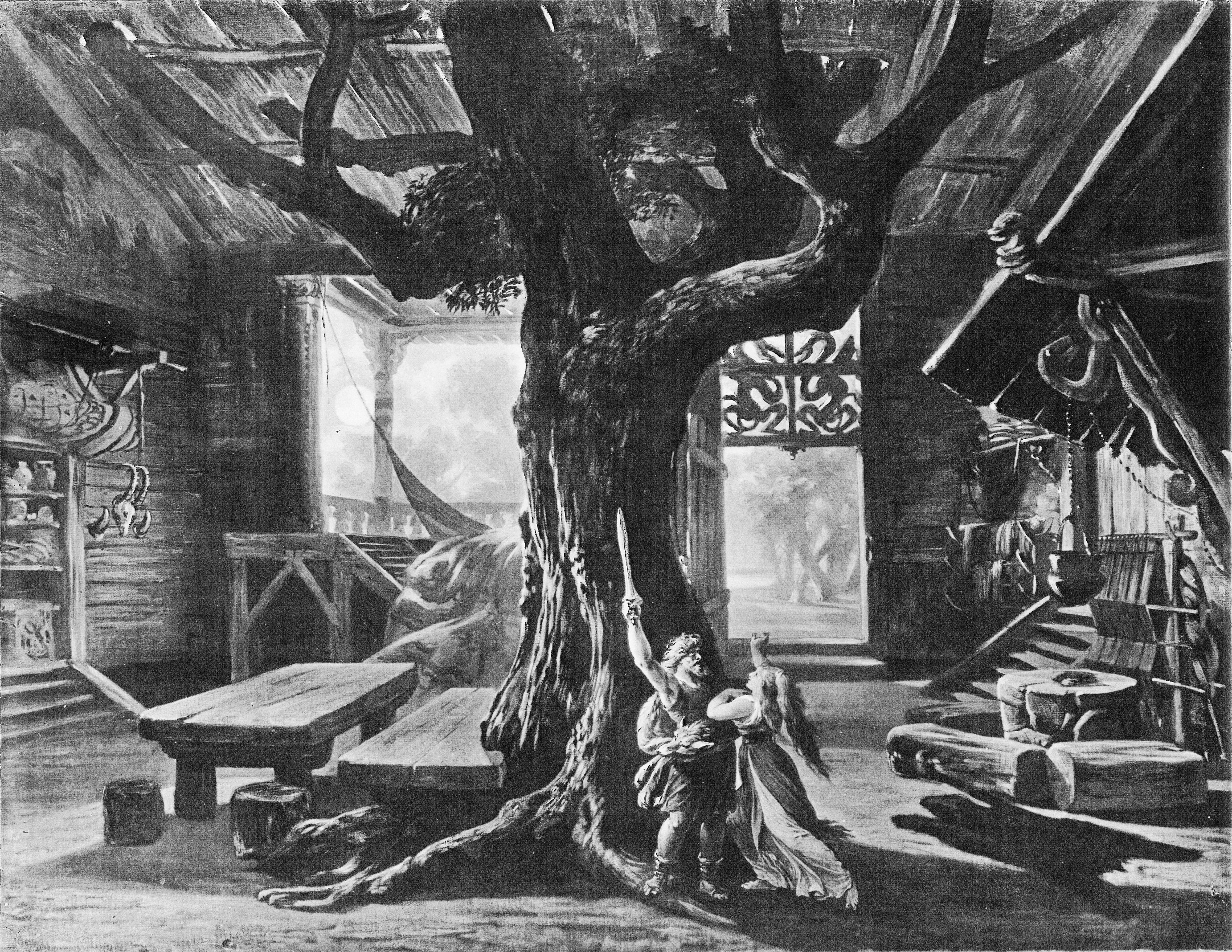
- Josef Hoffman's stage design for Act I, Bayreuth 1876
- Translation: The Valkyrie
- Librettist: Richard Wagner
- Language: German
- Based on: Nordic and German legends
- Premiere: 26 June 1870; Königliches Hof- und National-Theater in Munich

Die Walküre (German pronunciation: [diː valˈkyːʁə]; The Valkyrie), WWV 86B, is the second of four epic music dramas that constitute Richard Wagner's cycle Der Ring des Nibelungen (The Ring of the Nibelung). It was premiered as a standalone opera at the National Theatre Munich on 26 June 1870 and within the Ring cycle at the Bayreuth Festspielhaus on 14 August 1876. As Wagner conceived the cycle in reverse order of performance, Die Walküre was the third of the four texts to be written, although Wagner composed the music in performance sequence. The text was completed by July 1852 and the music by March 1856.

Wagner largely followed the principles related to the form of musical drama, which he had set out in his 1851 essay Opera and Drama, under which the music would interpret the text emotionally, reflecting the feelings and moods behind the work, using a system of recurring leitmotifs to represent people, ideas and situations rather than the conventional operatic units of arias, ensembles and choruses. Wagner showed flexibility in the application of these principles here, particularly in Act III, when the Valkyries engage in frequent ensemble singing.

As with Das Rheingold, Wagner wished to defer any performance of the new work until it could be shown in the context of the completed cycle, but the 1870 Munich premiere was arranged at the insistence of his patron, King Ludwig II of Bavaria. Die Walküre has achieved some popularity as a stand-alone work and continues to be performed independently from its role in the tetralogy.

The story of Die Walküre is based on the Norse mythology told in the Völsunga saga and the Poetic Edda. In this version, the Volsung twins Sieglinde and Siegmund, separated in childhood, meet and fall in love. This union angers the gods, who demand that Siegmund die. Sieglinde and the couple's unborn child are saved by the defiant actions of Wotan's daughter, the title character, Valkyrie Brünnhilde, who as a result faces the gods' retribution.

== Background and context ==
Structure of the Ring cycle

1. Das Rheingold
2. Die Walküre
3. Siegfried
4. Götterdämmerung

Wagner began work on what became his Ring project in October 1848, when he prepared a prose outline for Siegfried's Death, based on the legendary hero of Germanic myth. During the following months he developed the outline into a full poem or libretto.

After travelling to Switzerland in May 1849 Wagner continued to expand his project, having decided that a single work would not suffice for his purposes. He would therefore create a series of music dramas, each telling a stage of the story, basing the narrative on a combination of myth and imagination; Siegfried's Death would provide the culmination. In 1851 he outlined his purposes in his essay A Communication to My Friends: "I propose to produce my myth in three complete dramas, preceded by a lengthy Prelude (Vorspiel)". Each of these dramas would, he said, constitute an independent whole but would not be performed separately. "At a specially appointed Festival, I propose, some future time, to produce those three Dramas with their Prelude, in the course of three days and a fore-evening".

In accordance with this scheme, Wagner preceded Siegfried's Death (later Götterdämmerung (The Twilight of the Gods) with the story of Siegfried's youth, Young Siegfried, later renamed Siegfried. This was, in turn, preceded by Die Walküre (The Valkyrie), dealing with Siegfried's origins, the whole tetralogy being fronted by a prologue, Das Rheingold. Because Wagner prepared his texts in reverse chronological sequence, Die Walküre was the third of the dramas to be conceived and written but appears second in the tetralogy.

== Roles ==
Role	Description	Voice type	Munich premiere cast 26 June 1870 (Conductor: Franz Wüllner)	Cast at premiere of complete cycle 14 August 1876 (Conductor: Hans Richter)
Humans
Siegmund	Völsung son of Wotan, twin brother of Sieglinde	tenor	Heinrich Vogl	Albert Niemann
Sieglinde	Völsung daughter of Wotan, twin sister of Siegmund	soprano	Therese Vogl	Josephine Schefsky
Hunding	Of the Neiding race; husband of Sieglinde	bass	Kaspar Bausewein	Josef Niering
Gods
Wotan	God of battle, and of contracts, ruler of the gods	bass-baritone	August Kindermann	Franz Betz
Fricka	Goddess of marriage (including forced marriage); wife to Wotan	dramatic mezzo-soprano	Anna Kaufmann	Friederike Grün
Valkyries
Brünnhilde	Daughter of Wotan via Erda	high dramatic soprano	Sophie Stehle	Amalie Materna
Gerhilde	Daughter of Wotan	soprano	Karoline Lenoff	Marie Haupt
Ortlinde	Daughter of Wotan	soprano	Henriette Müller-Marion	Marie Lehmann
Waltraute	Daughter of Wotan	dramatic mezzo-soprano	Hemauer	Luise Jaide
Schwertleite	Daughter of Wotan	contralto	Emma Seehofer	Johanna Jachmann-Wagner
Helmwige	Daughter of Wotan	soprano	Anna Possart-Deinet	Lilli Lehmann
Siegrune	Daughter of Wotan	mezzo-soprano	Anna Eichheim	Antonie Amann
Grimgerde	Daughter of Wotan	mezzo-soprano	Wilhelmine Ritter	Hedwig Reicher-Kindermann
Roßweiße	Daughter of Wotan	mezzo-soprano	Juliane Tyroler	Minna Lammert

== Synopsis ==
=== Prior history ===
During the lengthy time that has passed since the gods entered Valhalla at the end of Das Rheingold, Fafner has used the Tarnhelm to assume the form of a dragon, and guards the gold and the ring in the depths of the forest. Wotan has visited Erda seeking wisdom, and by her has fathered a daughter, Brünnhilde; he has fathered eight other daughters, possibly also by Erda. These, with Brünnhilde, are the Valkyries, whose task is to recover heroes fallen in battle and bring them to Valhalla, where they will protect the fortress from Alberich's assault should the dwarf recover the ring. Wotan has also wandered the earth, and with a woman of the Völsung race has fathered the twins Siegmund and Sieglinde, who have grown up separately and unaware of each other. From the Völsungs Wotan hopes for a hero who, unencumbered by the gods' treaties, will obtain the ring from Fafner.

=== Act 1 ===
Barthold Schweback Siegmund with the sword "Nothung" the Royal Swedish Opera, 1914

Prelude to Act I

Scene 1

As a large storm rages, Siegmund finds shelter from his enemies in a large dwelling built around a massive ash tree. Unarmed and wounded, he collapses with exhaustion. Sieglinde enters; she gives Siegmund some water and some honeyed mead, and tells him that she is the wife of Hunding, and that he may rest there until Hunding's return. As they talk, they look at each other with growing interest and emotion. Siegmund gets ready to leave, telling Sieglinde that misfortune follows him, and he does not want to bring it on her; she replies that misfortune dwells with her already.

Orchestral Interlude

Scene 2

Hunding returns and questions Siegmund's presence. Calling himself Wehwalt ("woeful"), Siegmund explains that he grew up in the forest with his parents and twin sister. One day he found their home burned down, his mother killed and his sister gone. Recently he fought with the relatives of a girl being forced into marriage. His weapons were destroyed, the bride was killed, and he was forced to flee. Hunding reveals that he is kin to Siegmund's pursuers; Siegmund may stay, he says, but they must fight in the morning. Before leaving, Sieglinde gives a meaningful glance to a particular spot on the tree in which, the firelight reveals, a sword is buried to the hilt.

Scene 3

Sieglinde returns, having drugged Hunding's drink. She reveals that she was forced into the marriage and that during their wedding feast an old man appeared and plunged a sword into the trunk of the ash tree, which neither Hunding nor any of his companions have been able to remove. She is longing for the hero who will draw the sword and save her. When Siegmund expresses his love for her, she reciprocates, and when he speaks the name of his father, Wälse, she recognises him as Siegmund and realises that the sword was left for him. Siegmund then draws the sword from the tree. She reveals herself as Sieglinde, his twin sister. Siegmund names the sword Nothung and declares that it will be her protection. The two sing of their passionate love for each other as the act ends.

=== Act 2 ===
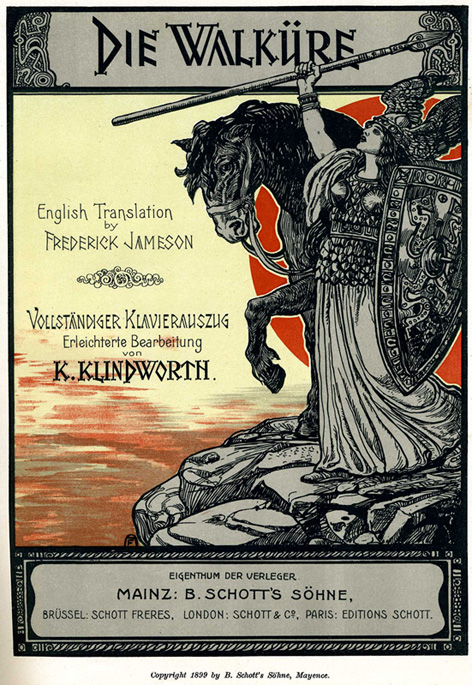
Brünnhilde on the mountainside; title page from the 1899 Schott's vocal score

Prelude to Act 2

Scene 1

On a high mountain ridge, Wotan instructs Brünnhilde, his Valkyrie daughter, to protect Siegmund in his forthcoming battle with Hunding. Fricka arrives, and in her role as goddess of family values demands that Siegmund and Sieglinde be punished for their adultery and incest. She scorns Wotan's argument that he requires Siegmund as a "free hero", who can further his plans to recover the ring from Fafner, uninhibited by Wotan's contracts. She retorts that Siegmund is not free but is Wotan's pawn, whose every move the god seeks to direct. Realising that Siegmund is indeed not the free hero he needs for his grand plan, Wotan reluctantly agrees that he will not protect his son.

Scene 2

After Fricka leaves, the troubled Wotan gives Brünnhilde the full story, and with great sorrow rescinds his earlier instruction; he orders her to give the victory to Hunding and then departs.

Orchestral Interlude

Scene 3

Sieglinde, who has suffered a panic attack during the night, is running away from Siegmund, who is pursuing her in alarm. He catches up with her, and she reveals that she regards herself as unworthy of her brother's love due to her forced marriage with Hunding. Siegmund tries in vain to comfort her. With a vision of Hunding's dogs pulling Siegmund down by his feet, Sieglinde faints, consumed with guilt and exhaustion.

Orchestral Interlude

Scene 4

Brünnhilde suddenly appears to Siegmund and tells him of his impending death; he refuses to follow Brünnhilde to Valhalla when she tells him Sieglinde cannot accompany him. Siegmund still believes that his father's sword will assure him of victory over Hunding, but Brünnhilde tells him it has lost its power. Siegmund threatens to kill Sieglinde rather than abandon her, friendless, after his death. Brünnhilde attempts to dissuade him by revealing that Sieglinde is pregnant with their child, but Siegmund simply prepares to kill both Sieglinde and the unborn child. Much moved, Brünnhilde decides to defy her father and grant victory to Siegmund.

Scene 5

Hunding's horn is heard; he arrives and attacks Siegmund. Under Brünnhilde's power, Siegmund begins to overpower Hunding, but Wotan appears and shatters Siegmund's sword with his spear. Hunding stabs Siegmund to death. Brünnhilde gathers up the fragments of the sword and flees on horseback with Sieglinde. Contemptuously, Wotan kills Hunding with a simple wave of hand, and sets out in pursuit of Brünnhilde, vowing to punish her harshly for her disobedience.

=== Act 3 ===
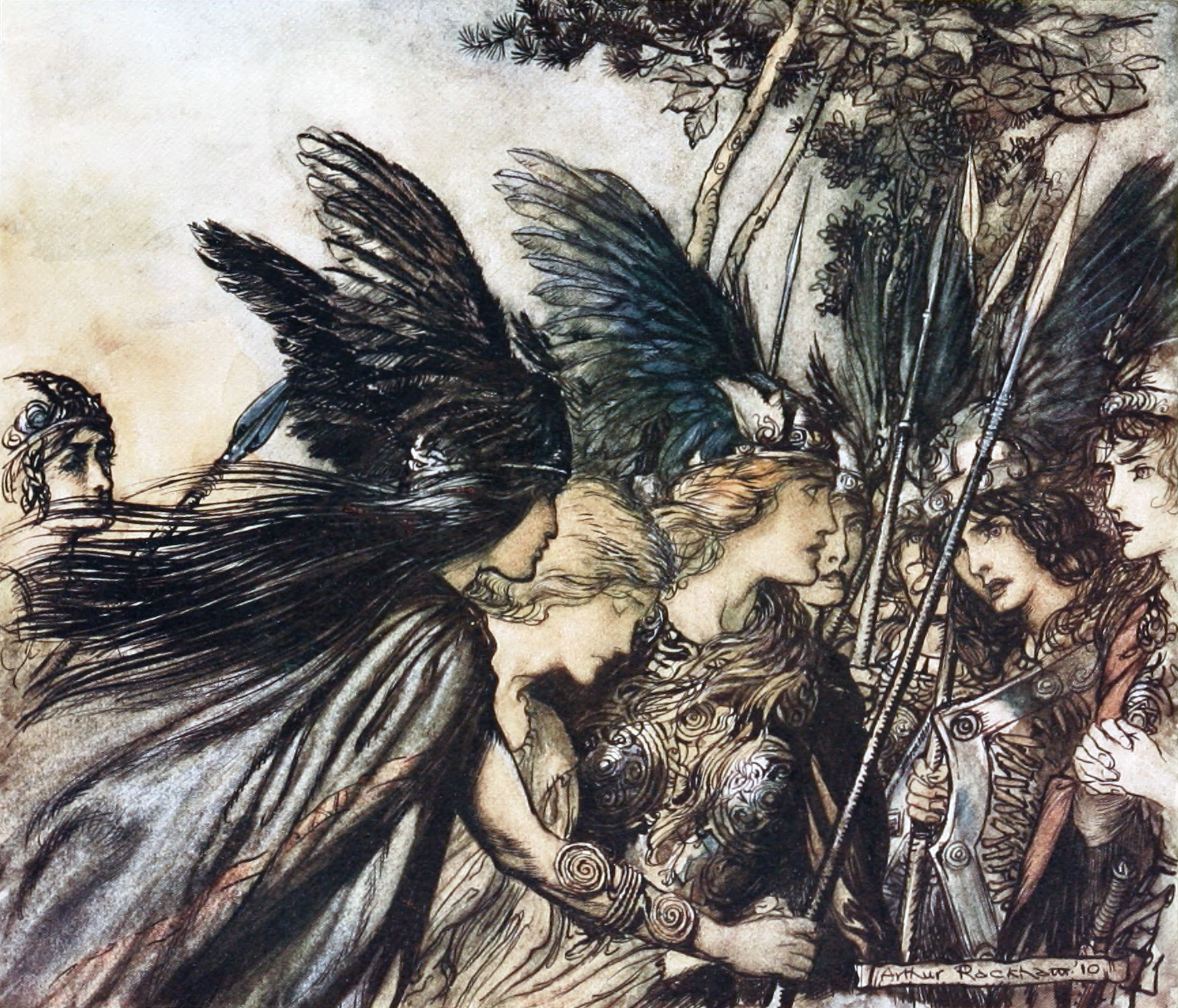
Brünnhilde pleads with her sisters to rescue Sieglinde: (Arthur Rackham, 1910)

Prelude to Act 3 - Walkürenritt (The Ride of the Valkyries)

Scene 1

The Valkyries congregate on the mountain-top, each carrying a dead hero and chattering excitedly. Brünnhilde arrives with Sieglinde and begs her sisters for help, but they dare not defy Wotan. Sieglinde tells Brünnhilde that without Siegmund she no longer wishes to live. Brünnhilde tells Sieglinde that she is pregnant by Siegmund and urges her to remain alive for her child's sake and to name him Siegfried. Brünnhilde gives the fragments of the sword Nothung to Sieglinde, who thanks her for her loyalty and comfort and resolves to save the child. As she departs, Wotan is heard approaching with great wrath.

Scene 2

When Wotan arrives the Valkyries vainly try to hide Brünnhilde. He faces her and declares her punishment: she is to be stripped of her Valkyrie status and become a mortal woman, to be held in defenceless sleep on the mountain, prey to any man who finds her. The other Valkyries protest, but when Wotan threatens them with the same they flee.

Orchestral Interlude

Scene 3

In a long discourse with Wotan, Brünnhilde explains that she decided to protect Sieglinde knowing that this was Wotan's true desire. Wotan consents to her request that he surround her resting place with a circle of fire that will protect her from all but the bravest of heroes. He bids her a loving farewell and lays her sleeping form down on a rock. He then invokes Loge, the demigod of fire, and creates a circle of perpetual fire around her. Before slowly departing, Wotan pronounces that anyone who fears his spear shall never pass through the fire.

== Writing history ==
=== Text, sources, characters ===
Wagner's original title for the work was Siegfried und Sieglind: der Walküre Bestrafung ("Siegfried and Sieglinde: The Valkyrie Punished"), but he quickly simplified this to Die Walküre. Prose sketches for the first two acts were prepared in November 1851, and for the third act early in the following year. These sketches were expanded to a more detailed prose plan in May 1852, and the full libretto was written in June 1852. It was privately printed, with the other Ring libretti, in February 1853.

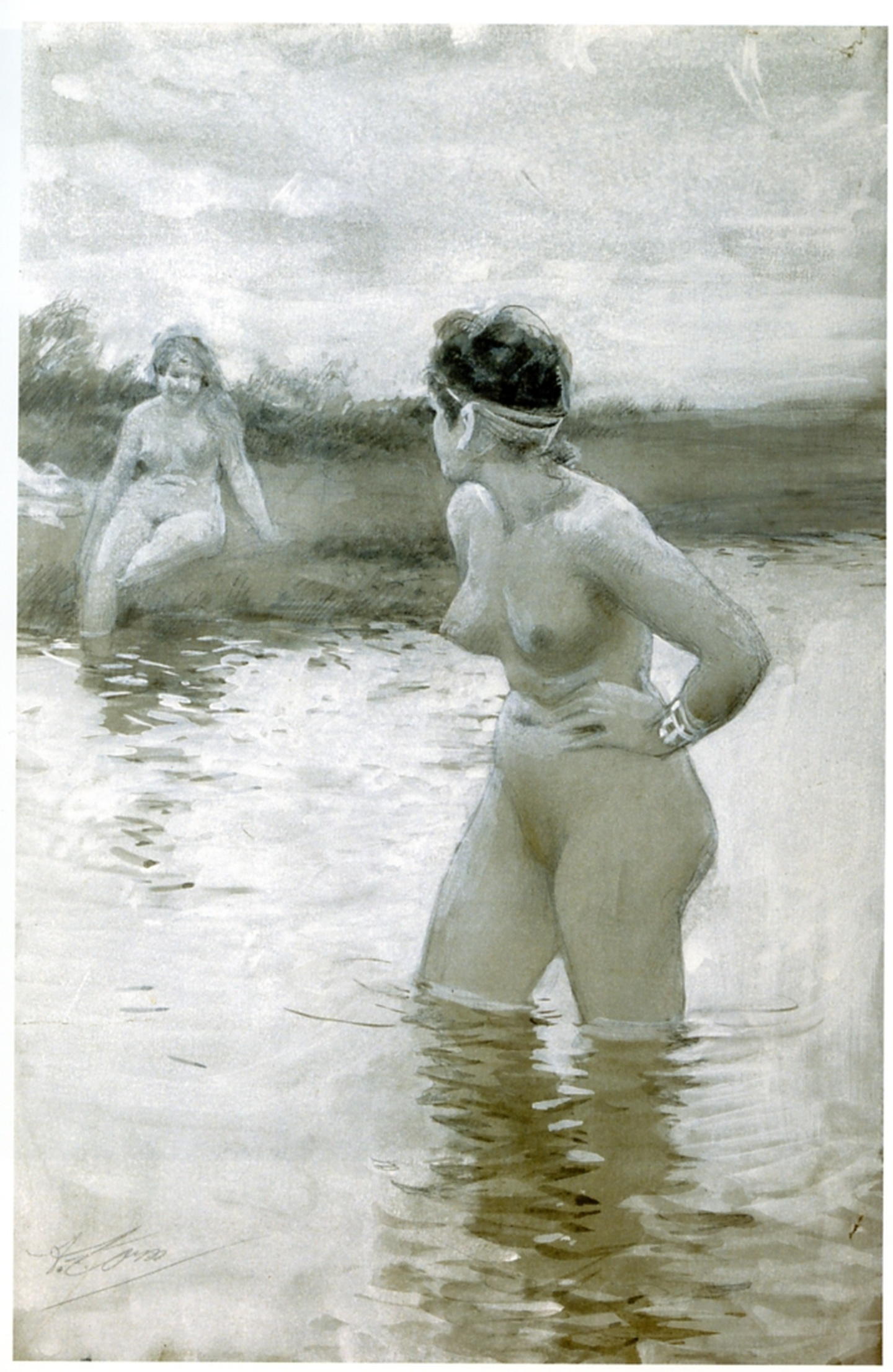
Brünnhilde in the Eddas – "superhuman strength"

Wagner constructed his Die Walküre libretto from a range of ancient Norse and Germanic sources, principally the Völsunga saga, the Poetic Edda, the Prose Edda, the Nibelungenlied and other fragments of Teutonic literature. From this plethora of material he selected particular elements and transformed them, to create his own narrative through the compression of events, the rearrangement of chronology and the fusion of characters. For example, in the Völsunga saga Siegmund is not Wotan's son, although he arranges the latter's conception by a Völsung woman. Sigurd (Siegfried) is not the child of Siegmund's incestuous marriage to his sister, but of a later wife who preserves the sword fragments. Likewise, in the sagas Sieglinde is a somewhat different character, Signy; she is Siegmund's twin sister, but the son she bears him is not Siegfried, and the manner of her death is quite different from that depicted by Wagner. Hunding is a conflation of several characters in the sagas, notably Siggeir who is wedded to Signy, and the villainous King Hunding who is Siegmund's mortal enemy in the Poetic Edda.

Wotan (Odin) appears in the northern sagas as the god of all life as well as of battles, although he is by no means omnipotent. Fricka (Frigg) has most of the hallmarks of her counterpart in the Poetic and Prose Eddas, as wife of Wotan and goddess of family values. Brünnhilde is a less central figure in the sagas than she is in the Ring cycle. In an early lay, she is sought as a wife by Gunther, who seeks the help of Siegfried in overcoming her superhuman strength. Certain aspects of her Ring character appear in the Eddas and the Nibelungenlied, such as her encirclement by Wotan in a ring of fire, and her rescue by a hero without fear.

The Valkyries have a basis in historical fact, within the primitive Teutonic war-cult. According to Cooke, originally they were "grisly old women who officiated at the sacrificial rites when prisoners were put to death." They became entwined in legend: in the Poetic Edda they emerge as supernatural warrior maidens carrying out Odin's orders as to who should die. In the Poetic Edda the Valkyries are given names: Skuld, Skogul, Gunn, Hild, Gondul and Geirskogul. Some of these names differ in other sources. The names that Wagner gave to his Valkyries were his own invention, apart from Brünnhilde and Siegrune.

Wagner effected a number of changes between his original draft and the final text. For example, in the first sketch, Wotan appeared in person in Act I to drive the sword into the tree. Siegmund withdrew the sword much earlier in the act, and in Act II Hunding was not slain by Wotan, but left alive to follow Wotan's instruction: "Get hence, slave! Bow before Fricka."

=== Composition ===
Apart from some rough sketches, including an early version of what became Siegmund's "Spring Song" in Act I of Die Walküre, Wagner composed the Ring music in its proper sequence. Having completed the music for Das Rheingold in May 1854, he began composing Die Walküre in June, and finished the full orchestral score nearly two years later, in March 1856. This extended period is explained by several concurrent events and distractions, including Wagner's burgeoning friendship with Mathilde Wesendonck, and a lengthy concert tour in London at the invitation of the Royal Philharmonic Society, when he conducted a full season amid some controversy, although his own Tannhäuser overture was well received.

The system of leitmotifs, integral to the Opera and Drama principles, is used to the full in Die Walküre; Holman numbers 36 such motifs that are introduced in the work. The well-known "Valkyrie" motif, used to introduce Brünnhilde in Act II, forms the basis of the famous Ride of the Valkyries that opens Act III. Wagner wrote the concert version of the Ride in 1862, for performance in concerts at Vienna and Leipzig.

== Performances ==
=== Premiere, Munich, 26 June 1870 ===
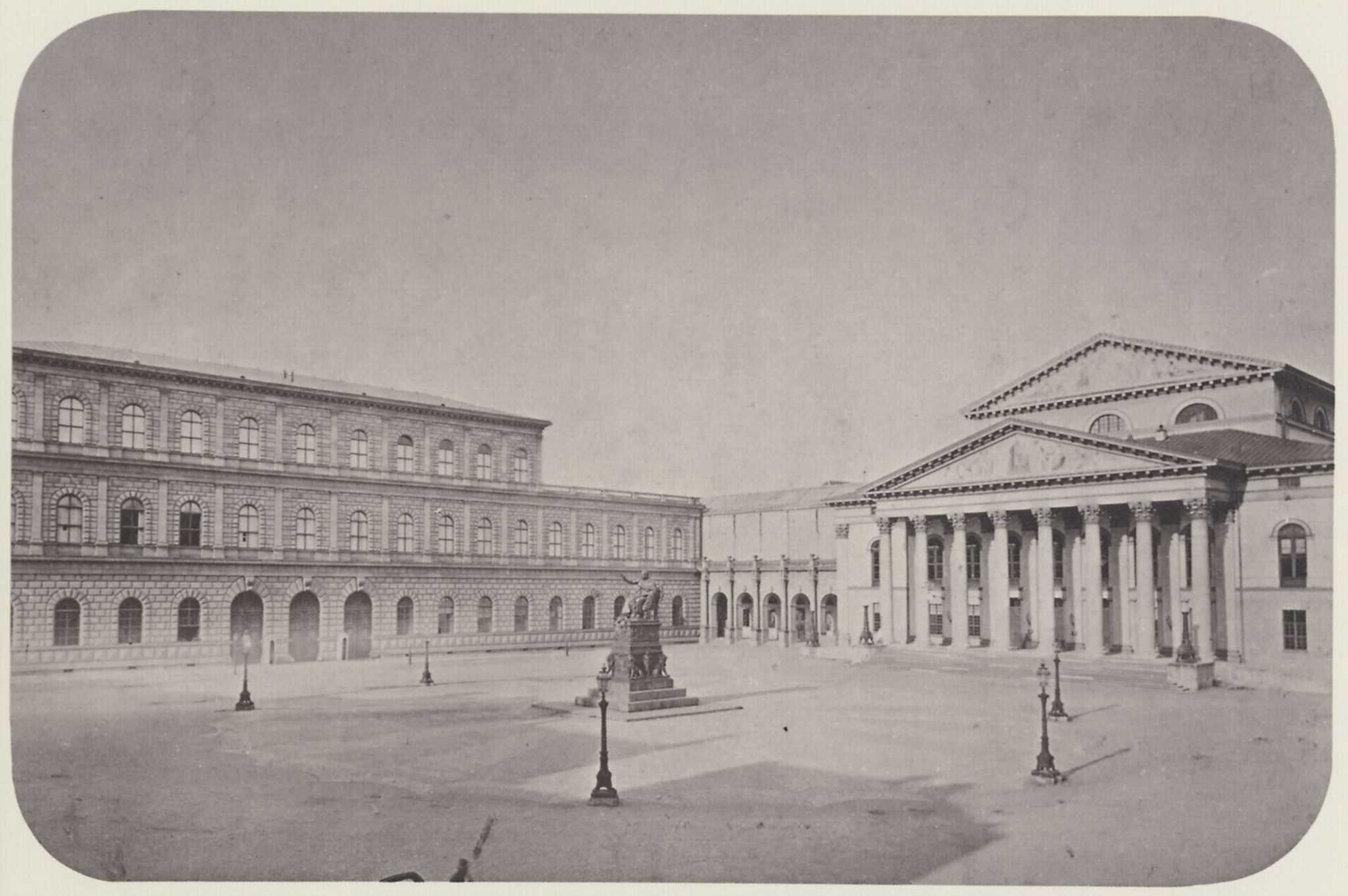
Munich Hofoper (right), photographed in 1860

As with Das Rheingold, many years elapsed between the completion of the Die Walküre score and its first performance. Seeing little chance of the Ring project coming to any immediate fruition, and in need of money, in August 1857 Wagner abandoned work on it and concentrated instead on Tristan und Isolde and Die Meistersinger von Nürnberg, and on a revised version of Tannhäuser. (Note: Wagner returned briefly to the Ring music in late 1862, when he prepared an orchestral version of the "Ride of the Valkyries".) However, King Ludwig of Bavaria, to whom Wagner had sold the copyrights to the Ring works, was insistent that the two completed Ring operas be staged, and over Wagner's bitter protests arranged for them to be performed at the Munich Hofoper, Das Rheingold on 22 September 1869 and Die Walküre on 26 June 1870. The core of Wagner's objection to a Munich performance was his relationship with the married Cosima von Bülow, with whom he was cohabiting in Switzerland; he could not return to Munich without provoking scandal, and therefore could not directly control the performances. (Note: Wagner and Cosima were not married until 25 August 1870.)

As the date for the Die Walküre premiere approached, Wagner grew more distressed and sullen; a letter from the critic Franz Müller reporting that everything was going well did nothing to console him. Cosima wrote in her diary that his distress "pierces my heart like a dagger, and I ask myself whether this disgraceful act will really go unavenged?". The premiere was attended by leading figures from the musical world, including Liszt, Brahms, Camille Saint-Saëns, and the violinist Joseph Joachim. The reception from audience and critics was much more positive than had been the case a year earlier with Rheingold, although Osborne quotes one dissenting voice, from the critic of the Süddeutsche Presse. Having described the first act as "for the most part, drearily long-winded", this critic thought that the second act dragged and came to life only occasionally. He went on: "The third act begins so deafeningly that total stupor would be ensured even if the rest were less long-winded ... The overall effect of the music is not agreeable...". Cosima kept all communications from Munich away from Wagner, and tore up the more critical newspaper reviews.

After a second performance, Die Walküre was performed at the Hofoper three further times, alternating with Das Rheingold in a Ring semi-cycle. King Ludwig, who was absent from the premiere, attended one of the later performances. The Munich festival had taken place amid a mounting war fever, as relations between France and the German states rapidly deteriorated; the Franco-Prussian War broke out on 19 July.

=== Bayreuth premiere, 14 August 1876 ===
In May 1872, Wagner laid the foundation stone for the Festspielhaus in Bayreuth, Northern Bavaria. He had originally envisaged holding the first Bayreuth Festival there in 1873, but delays in the building work, and in completing the Ring music, led to multiple postponements. Finally, the festival was scheduled for August 1876; Die Walküre would be performed on 14 August, the second day of the festival.

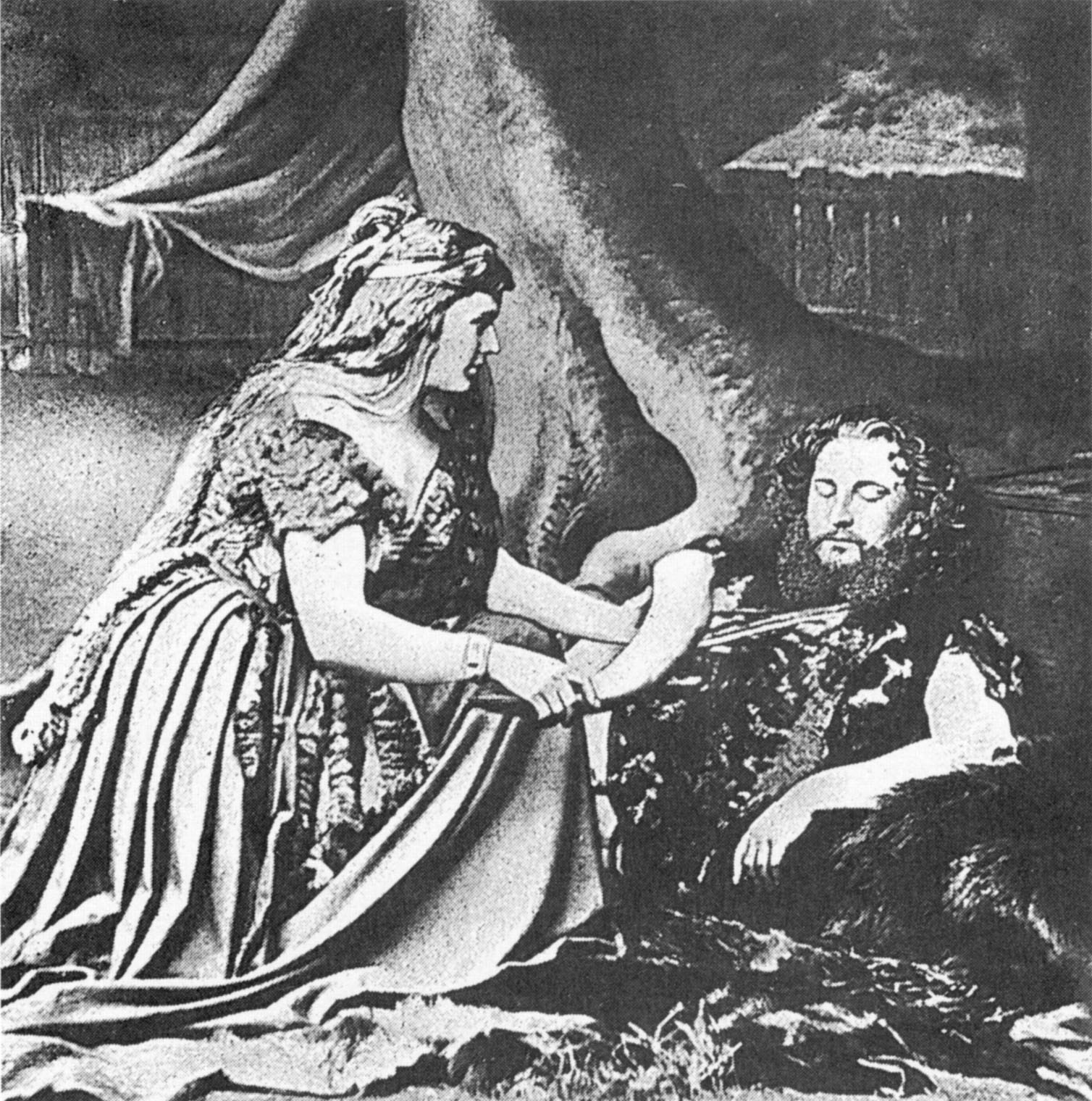
Act I at the Bayreuth premiere, August 1876: Sieglinde and Siegmund

Wagner was involved in every stage of the preparations; according to Ernest Newman's biography he was "a far better conductor than any of his conductors, a far better actor than any of his actors, a far better singer than any of his singers in everything but tone". Heinrich Porges, a contemporary chronicler, describes Wagner demonstrating to Amalie Materna, as Brünnhilde, how to sing the scene in which she tells Sieglinde of the impending birth of Siegfried: "He sang [the final words] with truly thrilling force". The singer Lilli Lehmann (Helmwige), in her 1913 memoirs, remembered Wagner acting the role of Sieglinde in rehearsals: "Never yet has a Sieglinde known how to approach him, even approximately".

The Die Walküre performance on 14 August was free from the mechanical problems that had affected Das Rheingold the day before, and was generally well received by the distinguished audience that included the Kaiser Wilhelm I, Emperor Pedro II of Brazil, representatives from various European royal houses and many of Europe's leading composers. Wagner, however, was far from pleased. He was unnerved by an incident involving the kaiser, when the 79-year-old Wilhelm stumbled and almost fell over a doorstep, and was very critical of two of his main singers, Niemann and Betz, whom he deemed "theatre parasites" and said he would never employ again – a view he later revised. Among the scenes that he felt had not come off were those on the mountain-top: "I'll change that some day when I produce Walküre in heaven, at the right hand of God, and the old gent and I are watching it together".

Three Ring cycles were performed in the first Bayreuth Festival. The stage designs used in Die Walküre, and the other operas, were based on sketches by Josef Hoffman which were converted to stage sets by the Brückner brothers from the Coburg State Opera. These designs, and Carl Döpler's costumes, influenced productions well into the 20th century.

=== Revivals ===
After the 1876 festival, Die Walküre was not seen again at Bayreuth for 20 years, until Cosima revived the Ring cycle for the 1896 festival. It was quickly taken up by other opera houses: Vienna and New York in 1877, Rotterdam in 1878 and London in 1882. The New York performance, on 2 April 1877, was conducted by Adolf Neuendorff as part of a Wagner festival organised by the Academy of Music; it preceded the Metropolitan Opera premiere by nearly eight years.

The London performance, at Her Majesty's Theatre on 6 May 1882, was the first Ring cycle to be performed anywhere, after the 1876 Bayreuth premiere. It was conducted by Anton Seidl, who had been an assistant to Wagner at Bayreuth, and had Albert Niemann in his Bayreuth role as Siegmund. The Musical Times, in a long review, mixed approval with criticism: its reviewer noted a number of empty seats in the auditorium, thought the stage sets compared unfavourably with those at Bayreuth, and deemed the orchestra "inefficient". However, the critic praised individual performances, and judged that the music and the drama had held the attention of an audience whose enthusiasm far exceeded that shown to Das Rheingold the previous day. The correspondent for The Era newspaper was distressed by the incestuous nature of the story, which it described as "brutal and degrading", despite the quality of the music: "A composer must have lost all sense of decency and all respect for the dignity of human nature who could thus employ his genius and skill".

The New York Met performance, on 30 January 1885, was part of a Wagner festival conducted by Leopold Damrosch – no other Ring operas were staged. Amalie Materna, Bayreuth's original Brünnhilde, reprised the part here. The stage designer, Wilhelm Hock, recreated the original Bayreuth designs. The performance was received with great enthusiasm by the audience, who demanded numerous curtain calls. Damrosch fell ill just before the festival ended, and died on 15 February 1885.

During the 1880s and 1890s, Die Walküre was shown in many European cities, sometimes as part of a Ring cycle but often as an independent work: Brussels, Venice, Strasbourg and Budapest in 1883, Prague in 1885, St Petersburg in 1889, Copenhagen in 1891 and Stockholm in 1895. By then it was travelling worldwide: to Mexico in 1891, Argentina in 1899, Australia in 1907, South Africa in 1912 and Brazil in 1913. These productions often followed the Bayreuth line of staying close to the staging and costumes that Wagner had approved for the original festival, although there were some deviations, such as Adolphe Appia's productions which replaced pictorialism with stylised sets using colours and lights.

At Bayreuth, no significant changes in presentation occurred until after the Second World War, when Wieland Wagner revealed his "New Bayreuth" style of largely bare stages and unadorned costumes. Although traditional productions continued outside Bayreuth, many performances followed the new trend. From the 1970s onwards there was increasing innovation; the Leipzig Die Walküre began the trend of placing the opening scene of Act II within Valhalla rather than on a mountain-top; Harry Kupfer at Bayreuth in 1988 set the whole cycle in a post-nuclear dystopia; Jürgen Flimm's Bayreuth 2000 production had Wotan as a corrupt businessman, sitting in an office surrounded by 21st-century paraphernalia, including a paper-shredder used to cover his tracks. A few prominent productions adhered to traditional staging, including Otto Schenk's at the New York Met in 1989, which was described by the New York Times as "charmingly old fashioned", and as "a relief to many beleaguered Wagnerites".

According to Charles Osborne, Die Walküre is sufficiently self-contained to be quite frequently staged on its own. The 2018 Bayreuth Festival broke new ground when for the first time it scheduled Die Walküre as a stand-alone, outside the context of the Ring cycle.

== Music ==
Osborne writes that, like Das Rheingold, Die Walküre is primarily a work for solo voices, but with better integration of the vocal parts into the overall musical structure. As with its predecessor, Wagner composed Die Walküre under the principles he had defined in his book-length 1851 essay Opera and Drama, eschewing the traditional operatic norms of chorus, arias and vocal "numbers". There is, however, some division of opinion as the extent that these principles were fully observed. The critic Barry Millington opines that of all Wagner's works, Die Walküre is the fullest embodiment of the Opera and Drama precepts, achieving a complete synthesis of music and poetry. This, he says, is achieved without any notable sacrifice in musical expression". In his analytical essay The Perfect Wagnerite, Bernard Shaw praises the synthesis of music and drama: "There is not ... a note in it that has any other point than the single direct point of giving musical expression to the drama". Gutman's view, however, is that this only applies to the first two acts; the "apogee" of this style, he says, is found in the later opera Tristan and Isolde. Roger Scruton refers to deviations in Die Walküre such as the "Spring Song" (Winterstürme), in which Siegmund holds up the action to declare his love for Sieglinde in what is to all intents and purposes an aria, while Osborne notes the "impressive ensembles" in Act III, as the Valkyries sing together.

=== Act I ===
The act opens in the key of D minor, which frames the music until Siegmund's death in Act II. The short prelude depicts a storm; a stamping rhythm in the basses rises to a climax in which "Donner's Call" from Das Rheingold is heard. As the scene proceeds, several new motifs are introduced; that representing Siegmund, derived from the "Spear" motif from Das Rheingold; that for Sieglinde, a gentle melody on strings, which Holman says "conveys at once Sieglinde's inner beauty and misfortune"; and the motif which Newman names "The Dawning of Love", which will recur in the final love duet of the act. These three motifs, and their developed variants, are prominent throughout the act. Among other motifs, the aggressive brass staccato that identifies Hunding is a particularly striking phrase, "as dark and dour as the man himself".

Wagner uses other Rheingold motifs to deliver key information. Thus, the parentage of Siegmund and Sieglinde is revealed to the audience as Wotan, when the Valhalla music plays softly on trombones. The same theme references Wotan again, when Sieglinde recounts the visit of the old man at her wedding. A repeated falling octave in G♭, extracted from the "Sword" motif, illustrates Siegmund's desperate desire for the sword, and recurs at the end of the act, together with the full "Sword" motif in triumphant brass, as he draws the sword from the tree.

=== Act II ===
The second act opens exuberantly, with a short prelude that prefigures the celebrated Valkyrie motif that in the following act will form the basis of the "Ride of the Valkyries" in Act III. This motif was first sketched in 1851, for intended use in Siegfried's Tot, before the full plan of the Ring cycle was developed. The first scene of the act introduces Brünnhilde's energetic "Hojotoho!", as she answers Wotan's summons, expressing what Holman describes as her "manly enthusiasm" for her role as warrior maiden. The Wotan-Fricka dialogue that follows is illustrated by motifs that express Fricka's sour disillusion with her marriage, and Wotan's bitterness and frustration as he is unable to answer his wife's forceful arguments.

In the colloquies between Wotan and Brünnhilde, several soundings of the "Woman's Worth" motif are heard. The "Annunciation of Death" motif is the crucial point, where the two narratives (Wotan/Brünnhilde and Siegmund/Sieglinde) come together. Wagner chose the tonality of F♯ minor for this scene, eventually modulating to B minor in preparation for the Valkyries' entry in Act III.

=== Act III ===
The act opens with the famous sequence known as the "Ride of the Valkyries", formed by combining the Valkyries' own belligerent theme with Brünnhilde's war cry from act II. The Ride has achieved lasting popularity as an orchestral concert piece outside the framework of the Ring cycle; according to Newman, in the orchestral version and sometimes within the opera itself, the basis staccato phrasing is corrupted by eliding the second and third notes and emphasising the fourth rather than the first as originally written.

At the end of the first scene, prior to Wotan's vengeful entrance and the long denouement with Brünnhilde, we hear the "Reconciliation" motif ("Redemption by Love" per Newman) in which Sieglinde praises Brünnhilde for her rescue: "O highest of wonders! Noblest of maids!". The motif will next be heard at the very end of the Ring cycle, bringing the entire tetralogy to a close on a note of reconciliation and optimism.

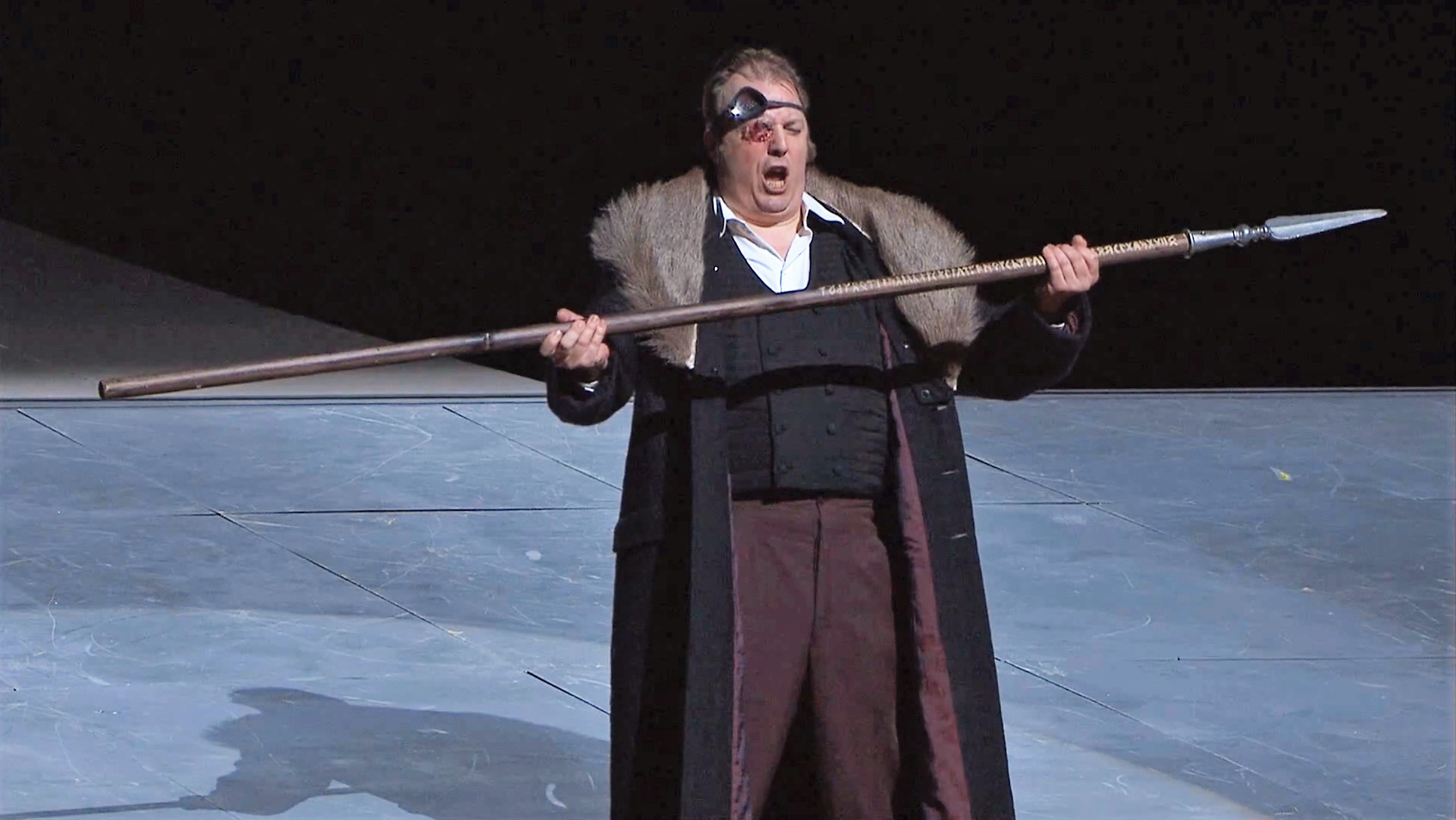
Renatus Mészár as Wotan, Weimar 2008

The final section of the act is marked by what Millington describes as "a succession of carefully controlled climaxes", of which the most affecting is that of Wotan's farewell to his errant daughter. The music is eventually dominated by the five falling notes of Brünnhilde's "Sleep" motif which, when Wotan has used his spear to summon Loge, is transformed into the "Magic Fire" music as Brünnhilde is encircled in the ring of fire, and Wotan sadly departs.

=== Instrumentation ===
Die Walküre is scored for the following instrumental forces:

- Woodwinds: piccolo; 3 flutes (3rd doubling 2nd piccolo); 3 oboes; cor anglais; 3 clarinets (3rd doubling D clarinet); bass clarinet; 3 bassoons
- Brass: 8 horns (5-8 doubling Wagner Tubas in Bb and F); 3 trumpets; bass trumpet; 2 tenor trombones; bass trombone; contrabass trombone (doubling bass trombone); contrabass tuba
- Percussion: 2 sets of timpani; cymbals; triangle; tam-tam; tenor drum; glockenspiel
- Strings: 16 first violins; 16 second violins; 12 violas; 12 cellos; 8 double basses; 6 harps
- Off-stage: cow horn, thunder machine

== Critical assessment ==
The first Munich performances of Die Walküre were generally hailed as successes by audiences and critics; leading composers who were present greeted the work with acclaim, recognising in it evidence of Wagner's genius. One dissident voice was presented by the critic of the Süddeutsche Presse, who was scathing about the dearth of moral standards expressed in the story and furthermore found the whole experience tedious: the first act was, for the most part, "wearyingly long-winded"; the second act only occasionally sprang to life, while in the third it was "barely possible to hear isolated shrieks from the singers through the tumult of the orchestra". The overall effect was "not agreeable ... permeated with what one can only call pagan sensuality, and ... produces finally nothing but an enervating dullness". This harsh, if isolated judgement, found some echo six years later, when Die Walküre was first performed at Bayreuth as part of the Ring cycle. Critics could now form relative views on the merits of the four operas. Although there was general admiration for the first act, Die Walküre emerged as the least-liked of the four, in particular on account of the second act, deemed "a great failure" and an "abyss of boredom".

Many modern critics of Die Walküre have recorded much more positive opinions. To Charles Osborne it is "marvellously rich ... Wagner has found a way to integrate his voice parts into the overall structure without sacrificing their lyrical independence". It is, he says, the opera that stands up most strongly outside the tetralogy, and is popular enough to be staged frequently on its own, even within Bayreuth festivals. (Note: The 2018 Bayreuth Festival broke new ground by presenting Die Walküre alone, outside the full cycle which was not performed that year.)

Writing in 2006, Millington thought that, notwithstanding the liberal use of ensembles in the third act, Die Walküre showed the greatest fidelity of the four operas to the theoretical principles expressed by Wagner in Opera and Drama: "A thoroughgoing synthesis of poetry and music is achieved without any notable sacrifice in musical expression". The modern view is that, of the Ring operas, Die Walküre is both the most approachable and the one that can most successfully be performed in extracts.

== Notes and references ==
=== Sources ===
- Bailey, Robert (July 1977). "The Structure of the "Ring" and Its Evolution". 19th-Century Music. 1 (1): 48–61. doi:10.2307/746769. JSTOR 746769.
- Cooke, Deryck (1979). I Saw The World End. Oxford: Oxford University Press. ISBN 978-0-19-315318-9.
- Griffel, Margaret Ross (2018). Operas in German: A Dictionary. New York and London: Rowman & Littlefield. ISBN 978-1-44224-797-0.
- Gutman, Robert W. (1971). Richard Wagner: The man, his mind and his music. Harmondsworth: Penguin Books. ISBN 978-0-14021-168-9.
- Herbert, James D. (Spring 2002). "The Debts of Divine Music in Wagner's Ring des Nibelungen". Critical Inquiry. 28 (3). University of Chicago Press: 677–708. doi:10.1086/343235. JSTOR 10.1086/343235. S2CID 162341183.
- Holman, J.K. (2001). Wagner's Ring: A Listener's Companion & Concordance. Portland, OR: Amadeus Press. ISBN 978-1-57467-070-7.
- Jacobs, Robert L. (1980). Wagner (The Master Musicians Series). London: J.M. Dent & Sons. ISBN 978-0-460-03153-0.
- Knapp, J. Merrill (Summer 1977). "The Instrumentation Draft of Wagner's Das Rheingold". Journal of the American Musicological Society. 30 (2). University of California Press: 272–295. doi:10.2307/831220. JSTOR 831220.
- Lehmann, Lilli (1914). My Path Through Life. London and New York: G.P. Putnam.
- Millington, Barry (1992). "The Music: Operas". In Barry Millington (ed.). The Wagner Compendium. London: Thames and Hudson. ISBN 978-0-50028-274-8.
- Millington, Barry (2006). The New Grove Guide to Wagner and his Operas. Oxford: Oxford University Press. ISBN 978-0-19-530588-3.
- Newman, Ernest (1947). The Life of Richard Wagner: Vol. IV. 1866–1883. London: Cassell.
- Newman, Ernest (1949). Wagner Nights. London: Putnam. OCLC 3974782.
- Osborne, Charles (1992). The Complete Operas of Richard Wagner: A Critical Guide. London: Victor Gollancz. ISBN 978-0-575-05380-9.
- Scruton, Roger (2017). The Ring of Truth: The Wisdom of Wagner's Ring of the Nibelung. London: Penguin Books. ISBN 978-0-141-98072-0.
- Shaw, Bernard (2008). "Preliminary encouragements". The Perfect Wagnerite. Dianne Bean and David Widger (ebook via Project Gutenberg). (Originally published by G. Richards, London 1898, OCLC 4815545)
- Skelton, Geoffrey, ed. (1994). Cosima Wagner's Diaries: an Abridgement. London: Pimlico Books. ISBN 978-0-71265-952-9.
- Spotts, Frederic (1994). Bayreuth: A History of the Wagner Festival. New Haven and London: Yale University Press. ISBN 978-0-300-05777-5.
- Vernon, David (2021). Disturbing the Universe: Wagner's Musikdrama. Edinburgh: Candle Row Press. ISBN 978-1527299245.
- Voss, Egon (2013). Der Ring des Nibelungen. in drei Aufzügen, WWV 86 B (1854-1856 (in German). Mainz: Schott. ISBN 978-3-7957-9873-4. OCLC 854991820.
- Wagner, Richard (1895). "A Communication to My Friends" (PDF). Translated by Ellis, William Ashton. The Wagner Library. Archived (PDF) from the original on 12 October 2012.
