= Marie Lehmann (soprano) =

German operatic soprano (1851–1931)

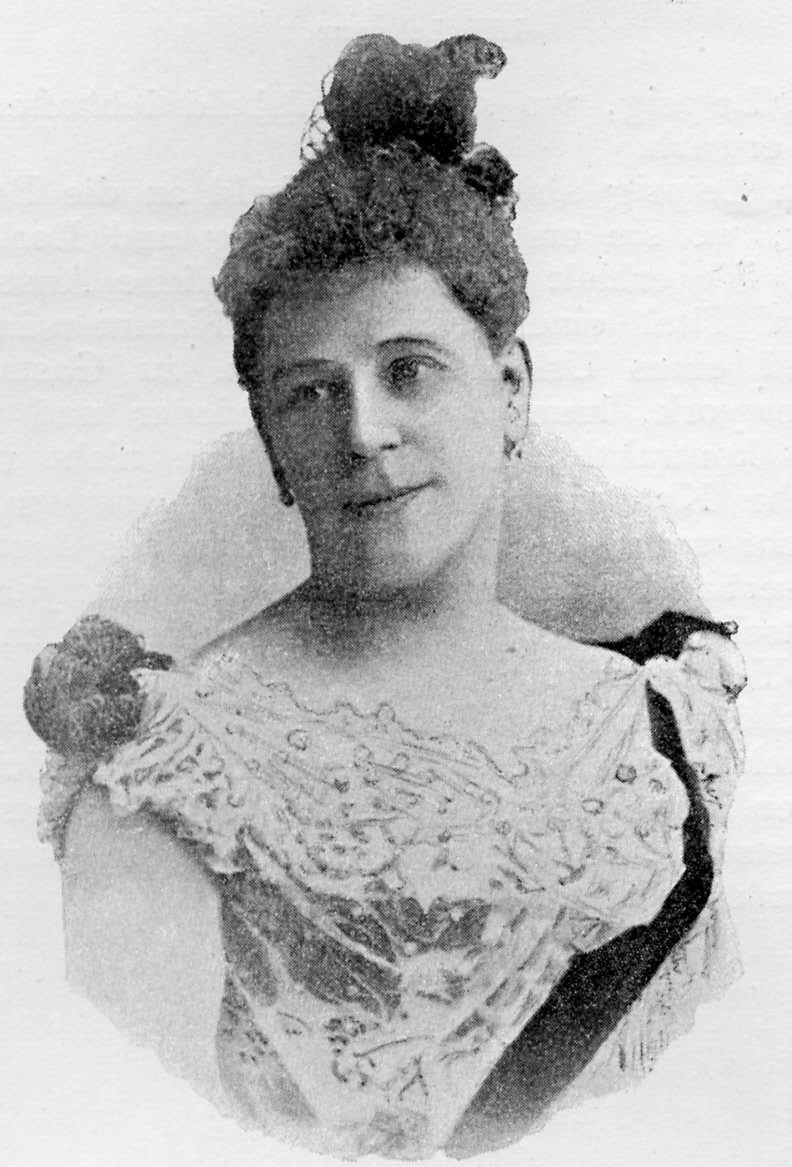
- Born: 18 May 1851; Hamburg, Germany
- Died: 19 December 1931 (aged 80); Berlin
- Occupation: Operatic soprano
- Organizations: Vienna Court Opera; Bayreuth Festival
- Parent(s): Maria Theresia Löw; Karl August Lehmann
- Relatives: Lilli Lehmann (sister)

Marie Lehmann (15 May 1851 – 19 December 1931) was a German operatic soprano. She had a coloratura soprano voice, but also appeared in Wagner's stage works, including the first complete performance of Der Ring des Nibelungen at the inaugural Bayreuth Festival in 1876, playing one of the Rhinemaidens.

== Career ==
Marie Lehmann was born in Hamburg, the daughter of the soprano Maria Theresia Löw and the heldentenor Karl August Lehmann; her sister of Lilli Lehmann. Her mother trained the girls, working in Prague.

Lehmann made her stage debut at the Leipzig Opera in 1867 as Ännchen in Weber's Der Freischütz, where she was engaged until 1869. She took a break of two years, continuing her career at the Hamburg Opera in 1871, at the Cologne Opera in 1873, at the Breslau Opera in 1878, at the German Theatre in Prague in 1879, and finally at the Vienna Court Opera from 1891 until 1896, where she also took mezzo-soprano and contralto roles. She performed there as a guest until 1901. The roles in her broad repertory included Mozart characters such as Konstanze in Die Entführung aus dem Serail, Susanna in Le nozze di Figaro, Donna Elvira in Don Giovanni, and the Queen of the Night in Die Zauberflöte, Marzelline in Beethoven's Fidelio, Leonore in Flotow's Alessandro Stradella, and Christine in Ignaz Brüll's Das goldene Kreuz, premiered in Berlin in 1875. Her roles included further Marguerite de Valois in Meyerbeer's Les Huguenots, Adalgisa in Bellini's Norma and Antonina in Donizetti's Belisario. She appeared in operas by Verdi, as Gilda in Rigoletto and Desdemona in Otello, and as Senta in Wagner's Der fliegende Holländer and Sieglinde in his Die Walküre.

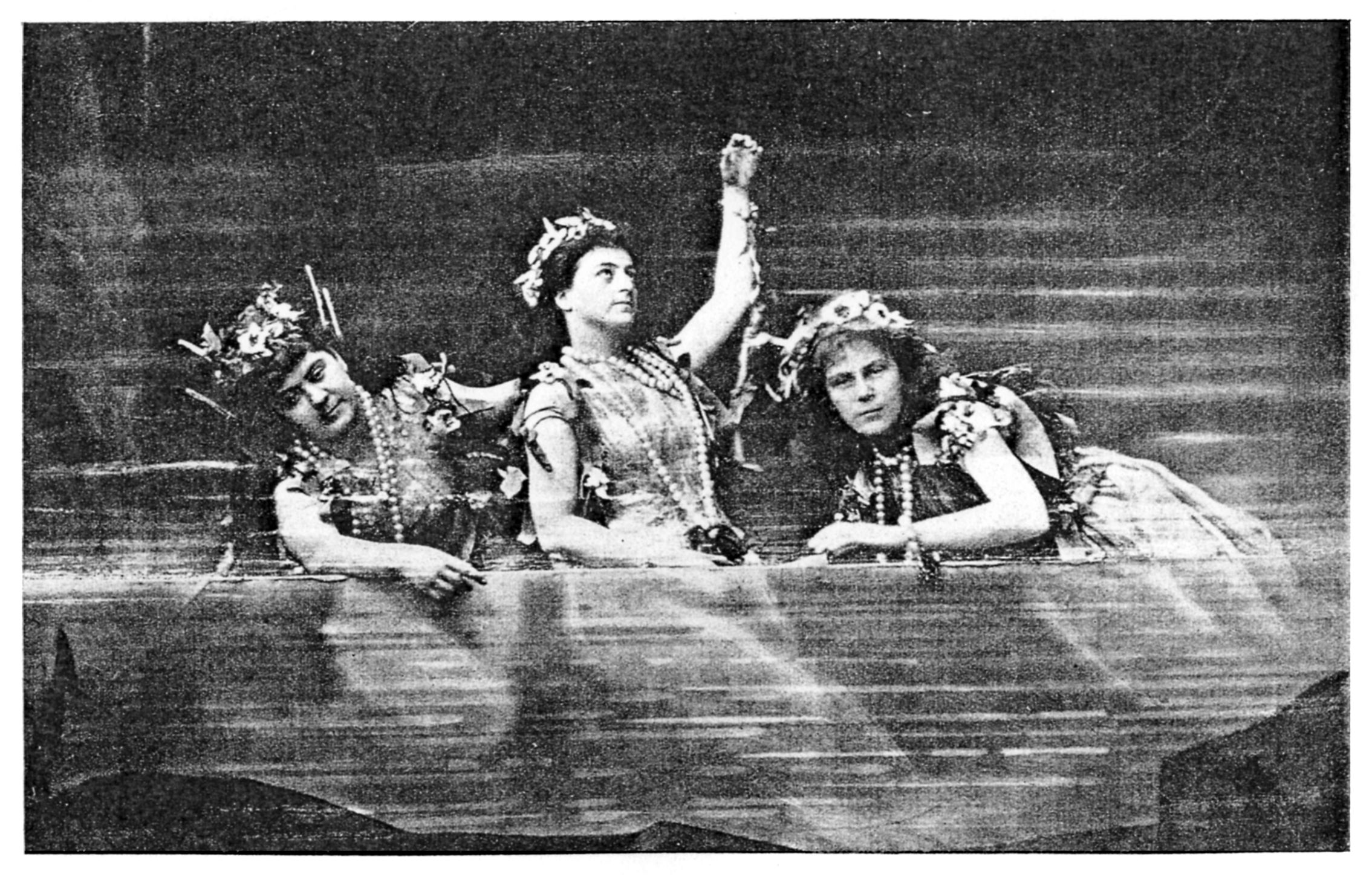
The Rhinemaidens in Bayreuth in 1876, in the first production of Wagner's Der Ring des Nibelungen, from left: Minna Lammert, Lilli Lehmann, Marie Lehmann

In Bayreuth, Lehmann performed the soprano solo in Beethoven's Ninth Symphony at the concert celebrating the laying of the foundation stone of the Bayreuth Festspielhaus in 1872, alongside Johanna Jachmann-Wagner, Albert Niemann and Franz Betz, with Wagner conducting. She created two roles, Wellgunde the Rhinemaiden and Waltraute the Valkyrie, in the first complete performance of Wagner's Der Ring des Nibelungen at the inaugural Bayreuth Festival from 13 to 17 August 1876. The other two Rhinemaidens were her sister Lilli and Minna Lammert. They performed "swimming" in an apparatus imagined by Wagner. After the opening scene was first tried, stage assistant Richard Fricke wrote in his diary that Wagner "thanked them with tears of joy". Lehmann sang again in Bayreuth in 1896, as the Second Norne in Götterdämmerung.

After her retirement, Lehmann lived in Berlin, where she died aged 80. Her daughter, Hedwig Helbig (1869–1951), became a concert soprano and an assistant to Lilli Lehmann.
