= Götterdämmerung =

1876 opera by Richard Wagner

- Music drama by Richard Wagner
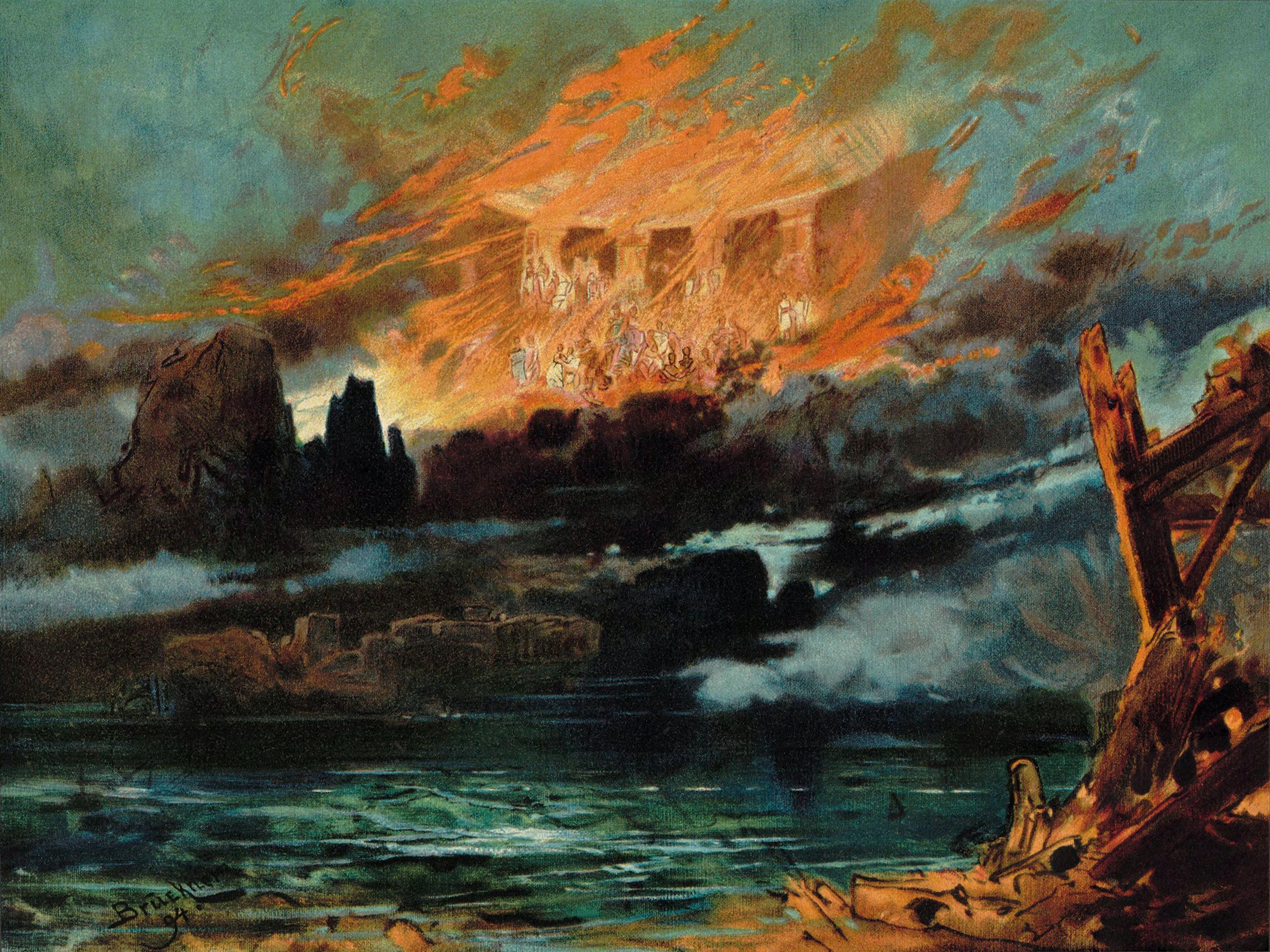
- Valhalla in flames, in an 1894 depiction by Max Brückner, one of the original set designers
- Translation: Twilight of the Gods
- Librettist: Richard Wagner
- Language: German
- Based on: Nordic and German legends
- Premiere: 17 August 1876; Bayreuth Festspielhaus

Götterdämmerung (German: [ˈɡœtɐˌdɛməʁʊŋ]; Twilight of the Gods), (Note: The work has sometimes been called in English "Dusk of the Gods" or "Doom of the Gods", but "Twilight of the Gods" correctly translates the German title. Dämmerung can also mean "dawn" as the term is used for both the rising and setting of the sun. Götterdämmerung is itself a translation of ragnarökkr, "Twilight of the Gods", as it is sometimes written in the Prose Edda. In the older Poetic Edda only ragnarök, "Fate of the Gods", is mentioned. It has been proposed that ragnarökkr was either a misconception on Snorri Sturluson's part or, more likely, poetic license as a play between the words rök, "fate, doom", and rökkr, "darkness, twilight.") WWV 86D, is the last of the four epic music dramas that constitute Richard Wagner's cycle Der Ring des Nibelungen (English: The Ring of the Nibelung). It received its premiere at the Bayreuth Festspielhaus on 17 August 1876, as part of the first complete performance of the whole work.

The title is a German calque of the Old Norse phrase Ragnarök, which in Norse mythology refers to a prophesied war among various beings and gods that ultimately results in the burning, immersion in water, and renewal of the world. As with the rest of the Ring, Wagner's account diverges significantly from these Old Norse sources.

The autograph manuscript of the work is preserved in the Richard Wagner Foundation.

== Roles ==
Roles, voice types, premiere cast
Role	Voice type	Premiere cast, 17 August 1876 Conductor: Hans Richter
Siegfried	tenor	Georg Unger
Brünnhilde	high dramatic soprano	Amalie Materna
Gunther	baritone	Eugen Gura
Gutrune	soprano	Mathilde Weckerlin
Hagen	bass	Gustav Siehr
Alberich	baritone	Karl Hill
Waltraute	mezzo-soprano	Luise Jaide
First Norn	contralto	Johanna Jachmann-Wagner
Second Norn	mezzo-soprano	Josephine Schefsky
Third Norn	soprano	Friederike Grün
Woglinde	soprano	Lilli Lehmann
Wellgunde	soprano	Marie Lehmann
Flosshilde	mezzo-soprano	Minna Lammert
Vassals, women

== Instrumentation ==
Götterdämmerung is scored for the following instrumental forces.

- Woodwinds: Piccolo, 3 flutes, 3 oboes (3rd doubling English Horn), 3 clarinets (3rd doubling bass clarinet), 3 bassoons
- Brass: 8 horns (horns 5–8 doubling 4 Wagner tubas [2 tenor, 2 bass]): 3 trumpets, bass trumpet, 3 trombones, contrabass trombone, tuba, off-stage steerhorns
- Percussion: timpani, cymbals, triangle, snare drum, glockenspiel
- Strings: 16 first violins; 16 second violins; 12 violas; 12 cellos; 8 double basses, 4 to 6 harps

== Synopsis ==
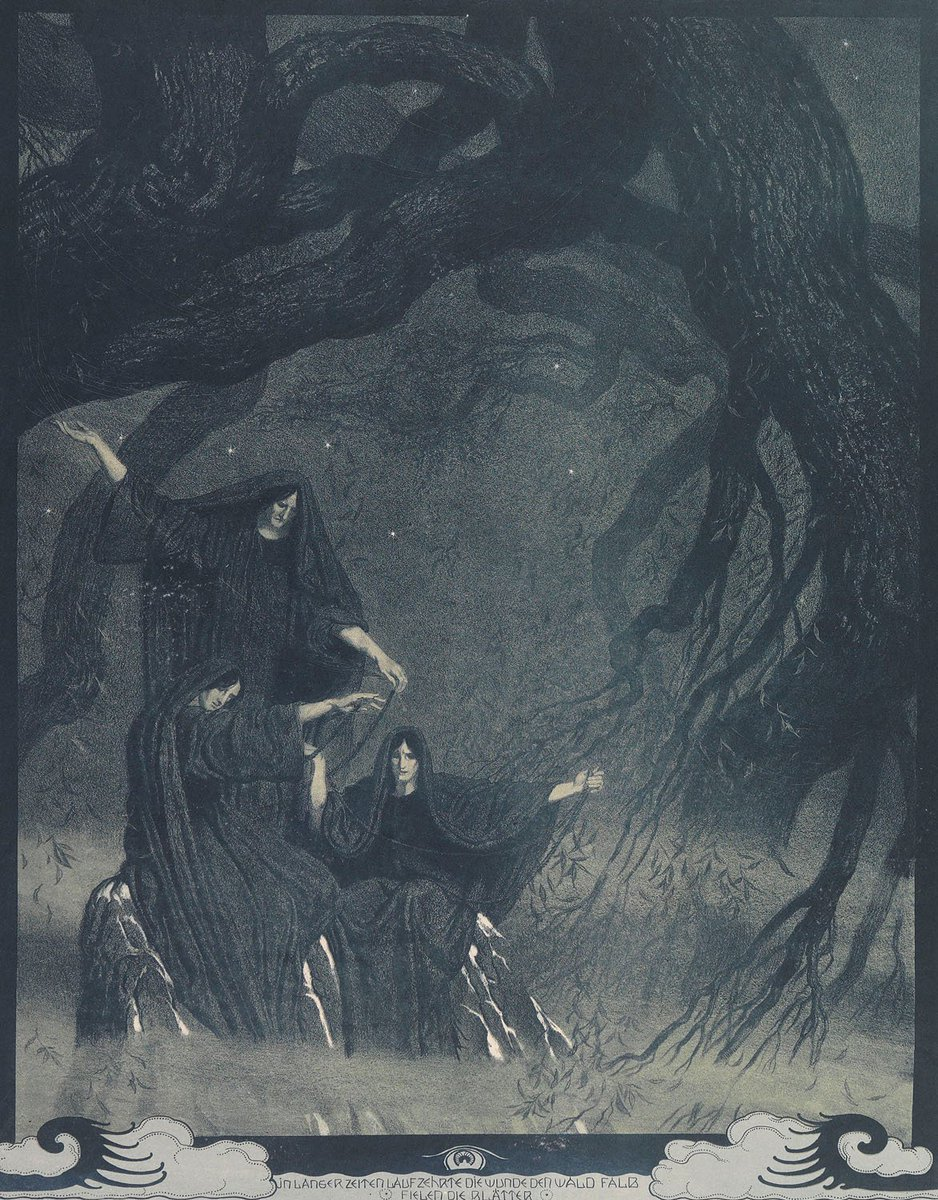
The Norns weave the Rope of Destiny, an illustration for Wagner's Ring by Franz Stassen, 1914.

=== Prologue ===
Prelude to the Prologue

==== Scene 1 ====
The three Norns, daughters of Erda, the goddess of Nature, gather beside Brünnhilde's rock, weaving the Rope of Destiny. From it they read of the past, the present, and of the future when Valhalla will be set on fire and the end of the gods will come ("Welch' Licht leuchtet dort?"). As their narration approaches the point when they want to sing about the fate of Alberich's ring and its curse and as the themes of Siegfried and the Curse of the ring are heard, the rope breaks. Lamenting the loss of their wisdom, the Norns disappear, returning to their mother Erda beneath the earth ("Zu End' ewiges Wissen!").

Orchestral Interlude - Tagesgrauen (Dawn)

==== Scene 2 ====
As day breaks, Siegfried and Brünnhilde emerge from their dwelling high on a mountaintop surrounded by magic fire ("Zu neuen Thaten, theurer Helde"). Brünnhilde sends Siegfried off to new heroic deeds, urging him to keep their love in mind. Siegfried proclaims himself to be simply an executor of her will, and as a pledge of his fidelity he gives her the ring of power that he took from Fafner's hoard. In a duet, both of them extoll their loving bond, which nothing can untie, even when distance keeps them apart ("O! heilige Götter!"). Bearing Brünnhilde's shield and mounting her steed Grane, Siegfried then rides away.

Orchestral Interlude - Siegfrieds Rheinfahrt (Siegfried's Rhine Journey)

=== Act 1 ===
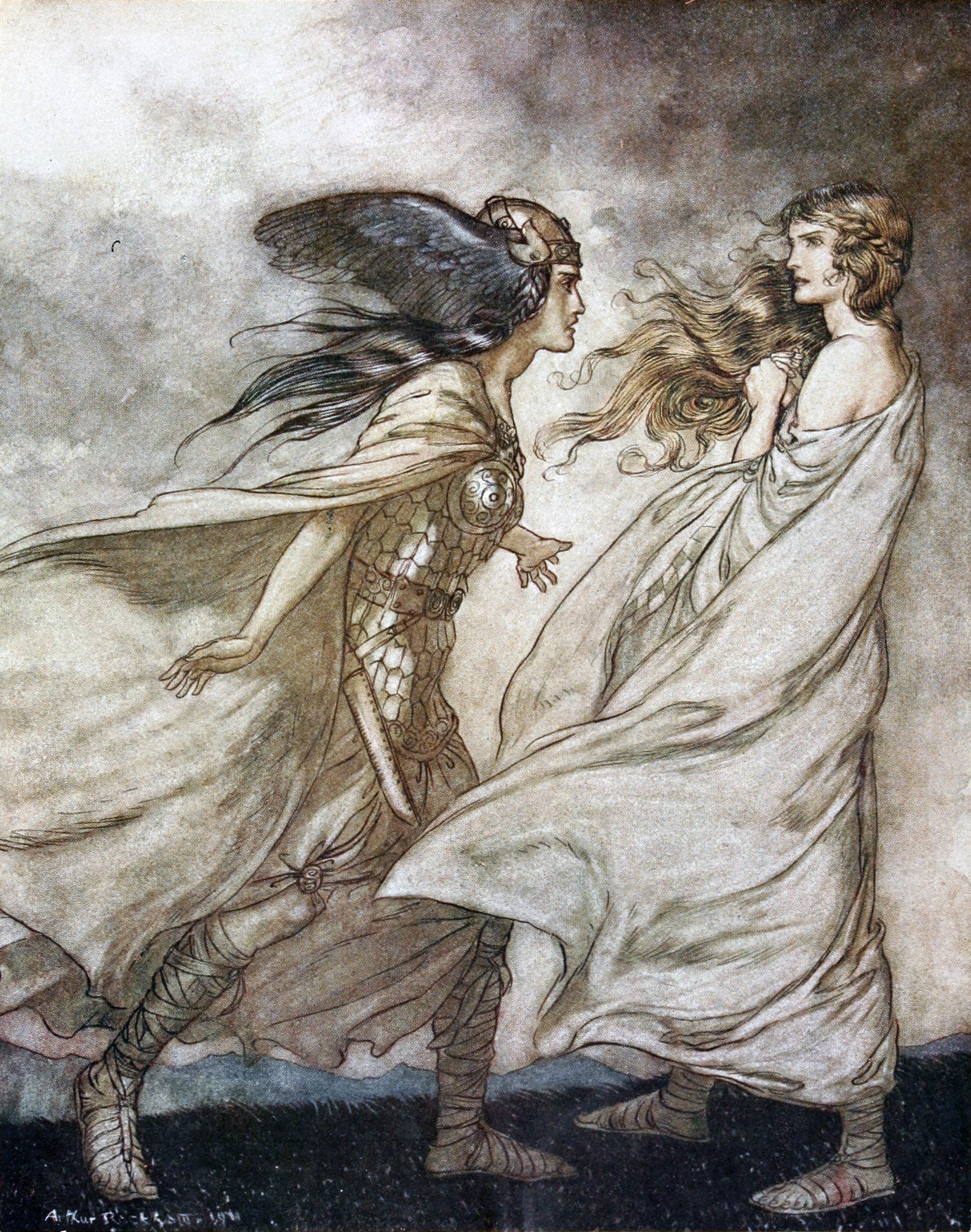
Brünnhilde is visited by her Valkyrie sister Waltraute (Arthur Rackham, 1912).

==== Scene 1 ====
The act begins on the shores of the Rhine in the Hall of the Gibichungs, a people named after the deceased king Gibich. Gunther, his son and heir, sits enthroned. Gunther's half-brother and chief minister Hagen advises him to find a wife for himself and a husband for Gutrune, the sister of them both, to enlarge the glory and might of their dynasty and secure it for the future. He suggests Brünnhilde, the noblest of women, as appropriate for Gunther, and Siegfried, the dragon-slayer, the greatest of heroes, as the best husband for Gutrune. Neither Gunther nor Gutrune knows how to win themselves such partners, but Hagen reminds Gutrune that he has given her a potion she can use to make Siegfried forget any woman he has ever seen and fall in love with her. Enamoured of Gutrune, Siegfried will then also be surely willing to bring Brünnhilde, who sleeps on a mountaintop encircled by fire only the fearless can pass, to Gunther in order to gain from him the permission for marriage with Gutrune. Gunther and Gutrune, not knowing that Siegfried and Brünnhilde are actually in love with each other, agree enthusiastically with this plan.

==== Scene 2 ====
Siegfried lands near the Gibichung Hall with his boat, seeking to meet Gunther, of whose fame he has heard during his journey ("Heil, Siegfried, theurer Held!"). Gunther extends hospitality to the hero, and Gutrune offers him the potion. Unaware of deception, Siegfried toasts Brünnhilde and their mutual love and drinks. In a while he loses his memory of her and is struck by desire for Gutrune. Drugged, Siegfried then offers to win a wife for Gunther, who tells him about Brünnhilde and the magic fire, which only a fearless person can cross. They swear blood-brotherhood, mixing their blood in a drinking horn ("Blühenden Lebens labendes Blut"). Hagen holds the horn but does not join in the oath, and the two new brothers then leave for Brünnhilde's rock. Hagen, left on guard duty, gloats that his so-called masters are unwittingly bringing the ring to him ("Hier sitz ich zur Wacht" - Hagens Wacht - Hagen's Watch).

Orchestral Interlude

==== Scene 3 ====
Meanwhile, Brünnhilde is visited on her rock by her Valkyrie sister Waltraute, who recounts that Wotan returned from his wanderings with his spear shattered. The spear was the symbol of the god's authority and the source and instrument of his power, carved with all the treaties through which he ruled. Unable to influence events any more, he has ordered branches of the World tree to be piled around Valhalla by its heroes and waits in resignation for his ravens to bring him news about the ring ("Höre mit Sinn, was ich dir sage!" - Waltraute's Monologue). Waltraute begs Brünnhilde to return the ring to the Rhinemaidens, but Brünnhilde refuses to relinquish the pledge of Siegfried's love, and Waltraute rides away in despair.

Crossing the ring of fire, Siegfried arrives disguised as Gunther by using the Tarnhelm and claims Brünnhilde for his wife ("Brünnhild', ein Freier kam"). Though Brünnhilde, terrified by the appearance of an unknown man, tries to resist him, without the divine powers she has earlier renounced for love's sake she has now nothing with which to defend herself but the ring, which Siegfried manages to snatch cruelly from her hand during a fight, being immune to its coercive power thanks to his fearlessness. Putting the ring on his own hand instead, Siegfried then spends the night with Brünnhilde on her rock, placing the magic sword Nothung between them as a witness to his loyalty to Gunther and his keeping the promise to bring Brünnhilde untouched ("Nun Nothung, zeuge du").

=== Act 2 ===
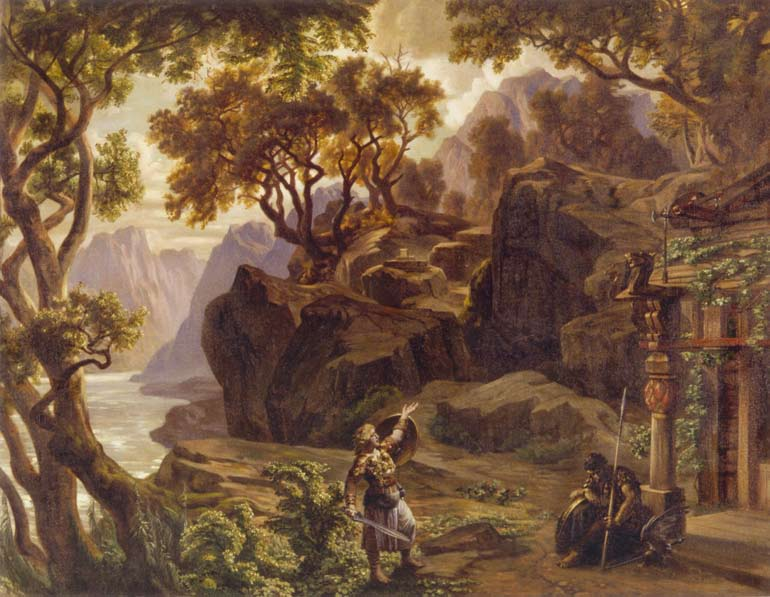
Stage design by Josef Hoffmann for original production in 1876 – Act II, Scene 2

Prelude to Act 2

==== Scene 1 ====
As Hagen sits sleeping on night watch, his father Alberich appears and urges him to obtain the ring ("Schläfst du, Hagen, mein Sohn?"). Hagen, barely conscious, swears to do so and Alberich vanishes with pleas for Hagen to remain loyal to him.

Orchestral Interlude - Morgenröthe (The Blush of Dawn)

==== Scene 2 ====
Siegfried arrives at dawn via Tarnhelm-magic back to the settlement of the Gibichungs, having resumed his natural form and left Brünnhilde on a boat on the Rhine with Gunther. He explains to Gutrune how he managed to change his form back from Gunther's just in time for Brünnhilde to not be able to recognize the deceit.

==== Scene 3 ====
Hagen summons the Gibichung vassals to welcome Gunther and his bride (Hagens Ruf - Hagen's Call). He does this by sounding the war-alarm. The vassals are surprised to learn that the occasion is not battle, but their master's wedding and party. Hagen announces that Gunther has won himself a wife, and orders them to slay sacrificial animals so that the gods may grant a happy marriage. The vassals are then told to defend their new queen's honour if someone were to wrong her.

==== Scene 4 ====
Gunther lands on the Rhine's shore in front of Siegfried, Gutrune, Hagen, and the assembled Gibichung men and women and leads in a downcast Brünnhilde as his trophy. With false pomp he then triumphantly announces a double wedding: Brünnhilde to himself, and Gutrune to Siegfried ("Brünnhild', die hehrste Frau"). Brünnhilde almost faints in despair as she now sees her beloved, who does not even recognize her, with a different woman. However, she notices the ring on Siegfried's hand, and realizes she has been betrayed ("Betrug! Betrug! Schändlichster Betrug!"). Declaring publicly that the man who conquered her and took the ring was not Gunther but Siegfried in disguise she exposes Gunther as an impostor who tried to increase his own prestige through the deeds of someone else. Filled with unquenchable desperate rage she also denounces Siegfried and falsely accuses him of having intercourse with her while in Gunther's form, thus breaking his blood-brotherhood with Gunther.

Siegfried denies Brünnhilde's charge, but the vassals urge him to prove his innocence by taking an oath. Hagen offers his spear as the weapon by which Siegfried can do so. Siegfried agrees and swears upon Hagen's spear-point that he may be killed with it if he has ever loved Brünnhilde ("Helle Wehr, heilige Waffe!"). She also seizes the spear and swears that Siegfried may be killed with it for swearing the false oath. Once again Hagen supervises silently as others take oaths to his advantage. The naively light-hearted Siegfried, wishing for his wedding day to be joyful, then leads Gutrune and the bystanders exuberantly off to the wedding feast, as if nothing too significant has happened.

Orchestral Interlude

==== Scene 5 ====
Brünnhilde, Hagen, and Gunther do not join the celebration and stay alone by the shore. Deeply shamed by Brünnhilde's outburst in front of his subjects and thus threatened in his authority, Gunther agrees to Hagen's suggestion that Siegfried must be killed in order for Gunther to regain his standing. Indeed, to see Siegfried die is Gunther's duty, since the hero has apparently broken the sacred bond of blood-brotherhood during the night on the rock with Brünnhilde, which betrayal condemns him by law to the rightful punishment of death. Brünnhilde, seeking revenge for Siegfried's manifest treachery, joins the plot and tells Hagen that Siegfried would be vulnerable only to a stab in the back. Hagen and Gunther decide to lure Siegfried on a hunting-trip and murder him. They sing a trio in which Brünnhilde and Gunther vow in the name of Wotan, "guardian of oaths", to kill Siegfried, while Hagen repeats his pledge to Alberich: to acquire the ring and rule the world through its power (Rache-Terzett - Vengeance Trio).

=== Act 3 ===
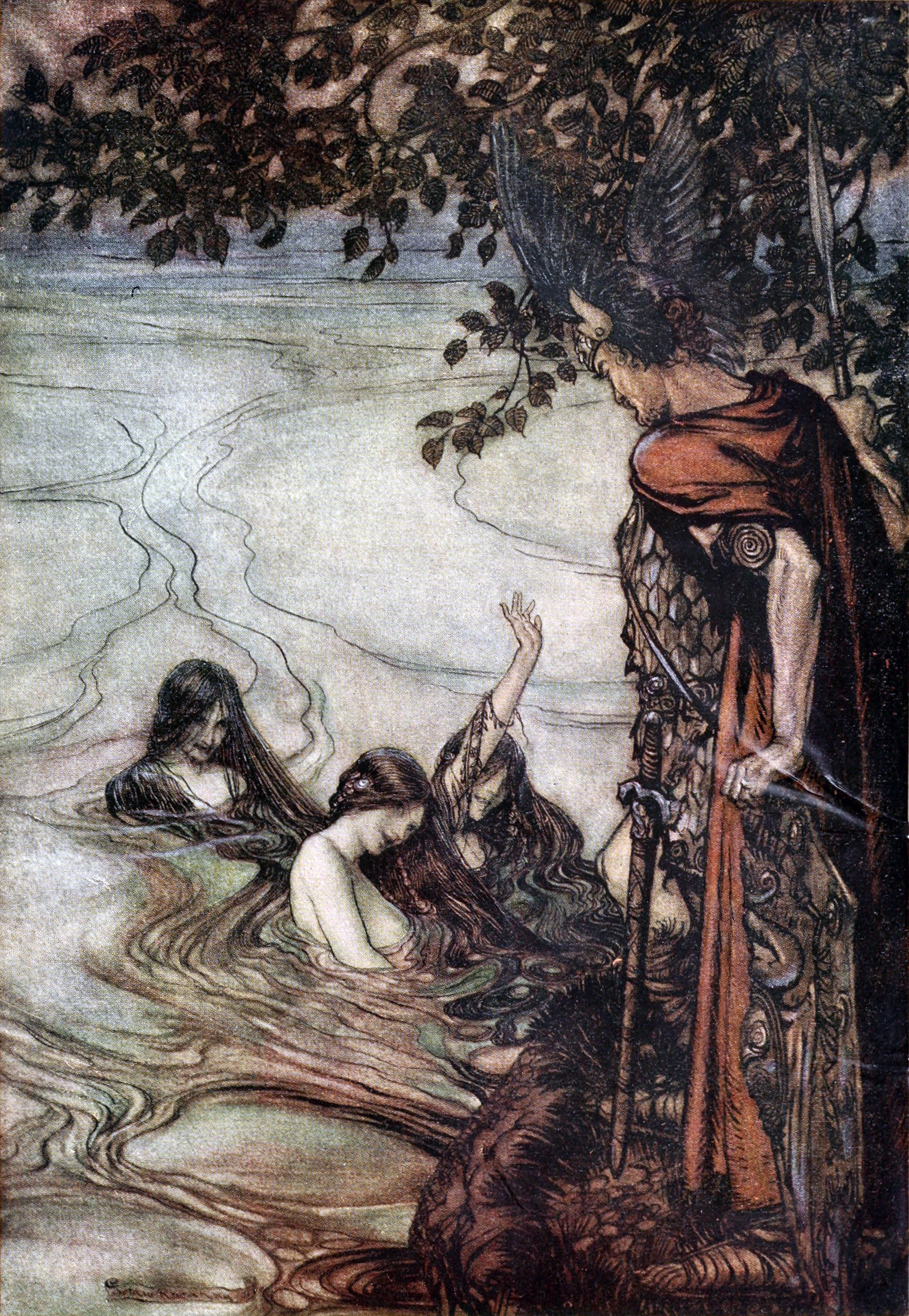
The Rhinemaidens warn Siegfried (Arthur Rackham, 1912)

Prelude to Act 3

==== Scene 1 ====
In the woods by the bank of the Rhine, the Rhinemaidens swim playfully and sing a song to the Sun, mourning their lost Rhine gold ("Frau Sonne sendet lichte Strahlen"). Siegfried happens by, separated from the hunting party while searching for prey. The Rhinemaidens urge him to return the ring to the Rhine and thus avoid its curse, but he laughs at them in heroic pride and says he prefers to die rather than bargain for his life. They swim away, predicting that Siegfried will die this very day and that his heir, a lady, will treat them more fairly.

==== Scene 2 ====
Siegfried rejoins the hunters, who include Gunther and Hagen. While resting, he sings them in high spirits a hero's song about the adventures of his youth ("Mime hieß ein mürrischer Zwerg"), recounting his life with Mime, the forging of Nothung, slaying the dragon Fafner and understanding the language of birds. Hagen gives him another potion, which restores his memory, and Siegfried tells of discovering the sleeping Brünnhilde and awakening her with a kiss. Upon hearing this, now having the apparent evidence of Siegfried's betrayal of the blood-brotherhood in front of Gunther and his men, Hagen stabs Siegfried in the back with his spear, declares that he had avenged perjury and calmly walks away. In his final agony Siegfried recollects the awakening of Brünnhilde and his love for her and with the memory of blessed fear the feeling for Brünnhilde had taught him, seeing her giving him greetings in a vision, dies ("Brünnhilde! Heilige Braut!"). His body is carried away in a solemn funeral procession that forms the interlude as the scene is changed and recapitulates many of the themes associated with Siegfried and the Wälsungs.

Orchestral Interlude - Siegfrieds Trauermusik (Siegfried's Funeral March)

Arrangement from Richard Wagner's 1876 Götterdämmerung: Siegfried's Funeral March and Finale

==== Scene 3 ====
Back in the Gibichung Hall, Gutrune awaits Siegfried's return. Hagen arrives ahead of the funeral party. Gutrune is devastated when Siegfried's corpse is brought in. Confronted with his sister's pain, Gunther blames Siegfried's death on Hagen, who replies that Siegfried had incurred the penalty of his false oath. Moreover, he claims the ring on Siegfried's finger by right of conquest. When Gunther objects, Hagen appeals to the vassals to support his lawful claim. Gunther draws his sword but Hagen attacks and easily kills him. As he moves to take the ring, however, Siegfried's hand rises miraculously in a threatening gesture. Hagen, as well as all present, recoil in utmost fear.

Brünnhilde, with her features as if transfigured, suddenly makes her entrance ("Schweigt eures Jammers jauchzenden Schwall!"), having in the meantime met on the river's shores the daughters of the Rhine, who talked to her about the ring and its curse. She proclaims Siegfried innocent, as she now recognizes that he betrayed her only due to an intrigue, and declares that Siegfried's betrayal and death were necessary for her to become all-knowing and completely free.

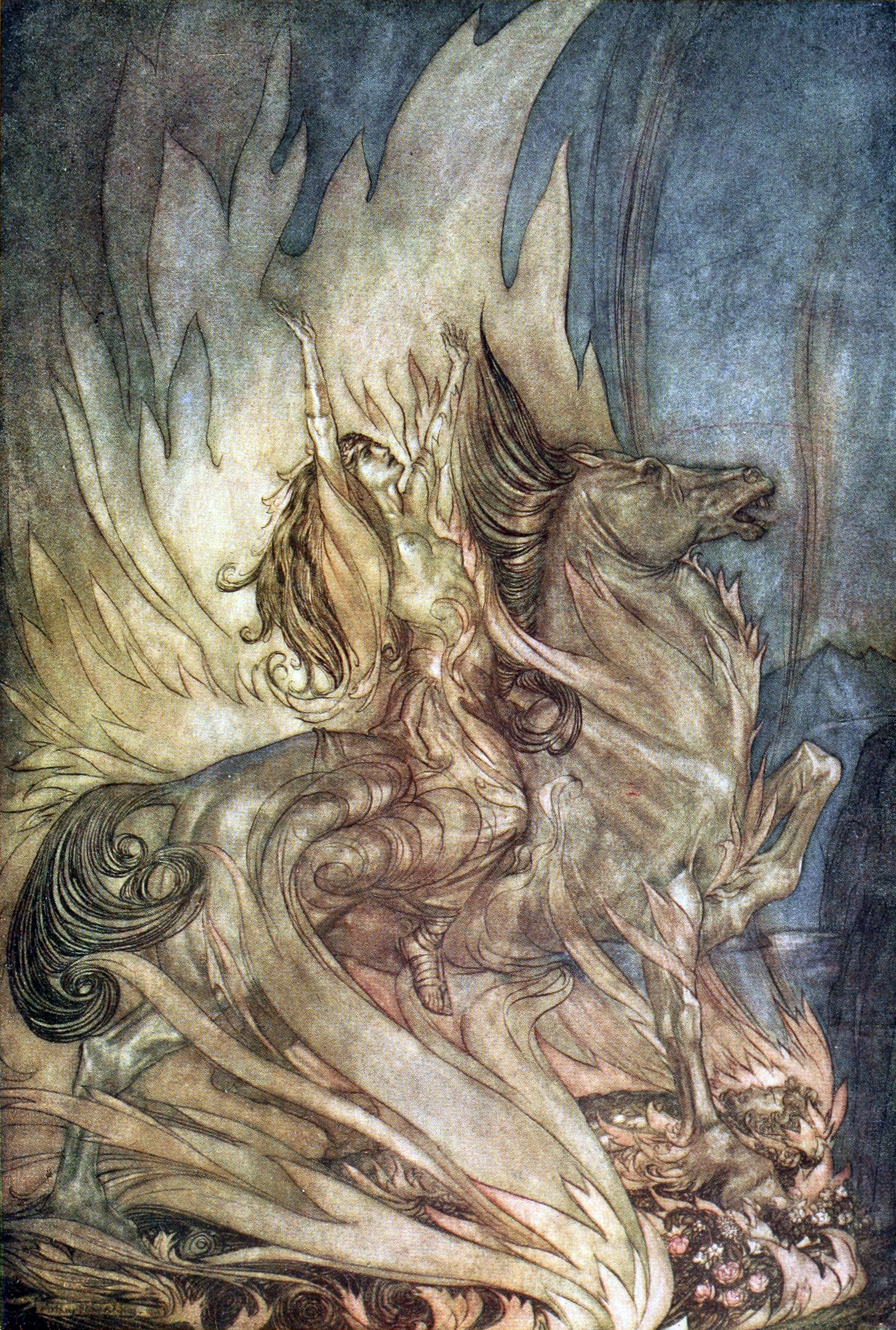
Brünnhilde's self-immolation

As queen of the Gibichungs, Brünnhilde orders a huge funeral pyre for the dead hero to be built by the river ("Starke Scheite schichtet mir dort") and takes the ring from Siegfried's hand. Looking skyward, she apostrophizes Wotan, ruler of oaths and laws, declaring that Siegfried's death has atoned for the god's guilt. Renouncing and overcoming the ring's power through the might of grieving love, she bequeaths it to the Rhinemaidens, who are to claim it from her ashes after fire has cleansed it of its curse, and declares that Wotan can finally rest in peace ("Mein Erbe nun nehm' ich zu eigen"). She then lights the pyre with a firebrand and, with "anxiously longed-for tidings", sends Wotan's ravens home to command Loge, the god of fire, to fly to Valhalla and set it ablaze ("Fliegt heim, ihr Raben!"). After a final eulogy to Siegfried, Brünnhilde, longing for their reunion, mounts her horse Grane and, as a valkyrie, rides into the flames to join him in death.

A sequence of leitmotifs portray the fire flaring up, and the hall of the Gibichungs catching fire and collapsing. The Rhine overflows its banks, quenching the flames, and the Rhinemaidens swim in to claim the ring. Hagen in a frenzy tries at the last moment to stop them and seize the ring for himself, but they drag him into the depths and drown him ("Zurück vom Ring!"), the theme of the curse of the ring then being heard for the final time. As they celebrate the return of the Rhinegold to their river and the breaking of its curse, a red glow spreads through the sky. The surviving Gibichungs now see the interior of Valhalla with gods and heroes visible, as described by Waltraute in Act I, Scene 3. A new fire flares up around the Hall of the Gods, hiding it from sight; the gods are consumed in flames and the curtain falls. At the very end of the work the strains of the Liebeserlösung (redemption-through-love) leitmotif emerge.

== Reactions ==
Robert A. Hall Jr. has analysed Götterdämmerung in terms of cultural symbolism. Hermann Danuser has discussed the dramaturgy of the ending of Götterdämmerung in the context of the entire Ring cycle. William Kinderman has evaluated a large-scale instance of musical recapitulation in Act III. Warren J. Darcy has expostulated on the potential influence of Wagner's readings of the philosophy of Arthur Schopenhauer on the music of the Ring cycle, particularly on the ending of Götterdämmerung.

The German bass Kurt Moll noted that the role of the principal villain, Hagen, is unique in the bass repertoire. It demands a shouting, blaring vocal technique that risks damaging the singer's voice; only very large-voiced, powerful singers can perform it. Moll himself chose to avoid the role.

Friedrich Nietzsche's 1888–1889 book, Götzendämmerung—Twilight of the Idols—is a pun on the title of Götterdämmerung, Götze being the German word for "idol" or "false god".
