= Maria Theresia Löw =

German opera singer

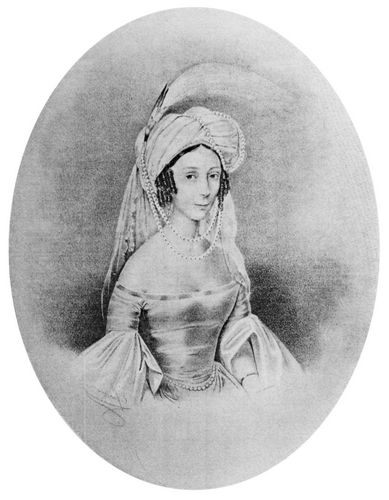
Maria Theresia Löw as Rebecca in Heinrich Marschner's Der Templer und die Jüdin

Maria Theresia Löw (27 March 1809 – 30 December 1885) was a German operatic soprano and harpist. She was born in Heidelberg, Germany.

After her musical education in Frankfurt by Heinrich Anton Föppel. A childhood friend of Richard Wagner, she first appeared at the Court Theatre in Kassel under the conductor and composer Louis Spohr. She married heldentenor Karl-August Lehmannde. Their daughters Lilli Lehmann and Marie Lehmann also became soprano singers. After separating from her husband about 1853, she took care of their vocal training. In addition to her daughters, she trained the voices of other singers of her era, working at the German Theatre in Prague where she lived from 1853.

Her uncle (father of her brother) Johannes Loew from Speyer was knighted by the Bavarian government. His daughter Amalie Löw married the politician Karl Theodor von Wrede. She died on 30 December 1885 at the age of 86 in Berlin.

== Publications ==
- Lilli Lehmann: Meine Gesangskunst. Berlin, 1902.
- Lilli Lehmann: Main Leben. Leipzig 1913, Neudruck 1977.
