= Mathilde Weckerlin =

German operatic soprano (1848–1928)

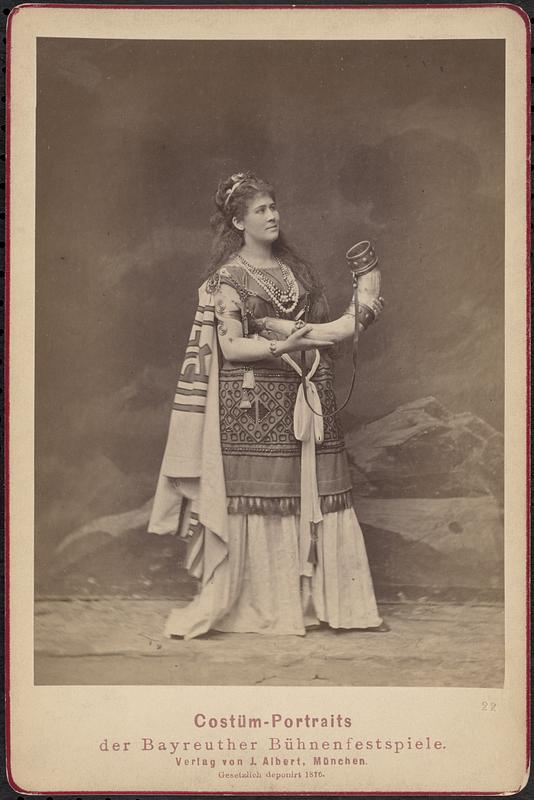
Weckerlin "Gutrune" 1876, 1876, Cabinet Card Collection, Boston Public Library

Mathilde Weckerlin (b. Sigmaringa, Baden-Württemberg (Germany), June 5, 1848; d. Pöcking, Bavaria, July 18, 1928) was a German operatic soprano.

She studied singing with Julius Stockhausen, and made her debut at the Dessau Court Theatre in 1868, where she was a member of the company for three years. She then sang at the Hannover Court Theatre from 1871 onwards. In 1876 she was part of the Munich Court opera ensemble, and later that year sang at the first Bayreuth Festival in the first full performance of Der Ring des Nibelungen; played the role of Gutrune in the premiere of Götterdämmerung.

In addition to Wagnerian roles, she excelled as Norma, Leonora in Fidelio, and Aida; and sang at the premiere of Heinrich Zöllner's Faust in Munich in 1887. She married the composer Hans Bussmeyer (1853–1930) in 1877 and retired from the stage in 1896.
