= Minna Lammert =

German opera singer (1852–1921)

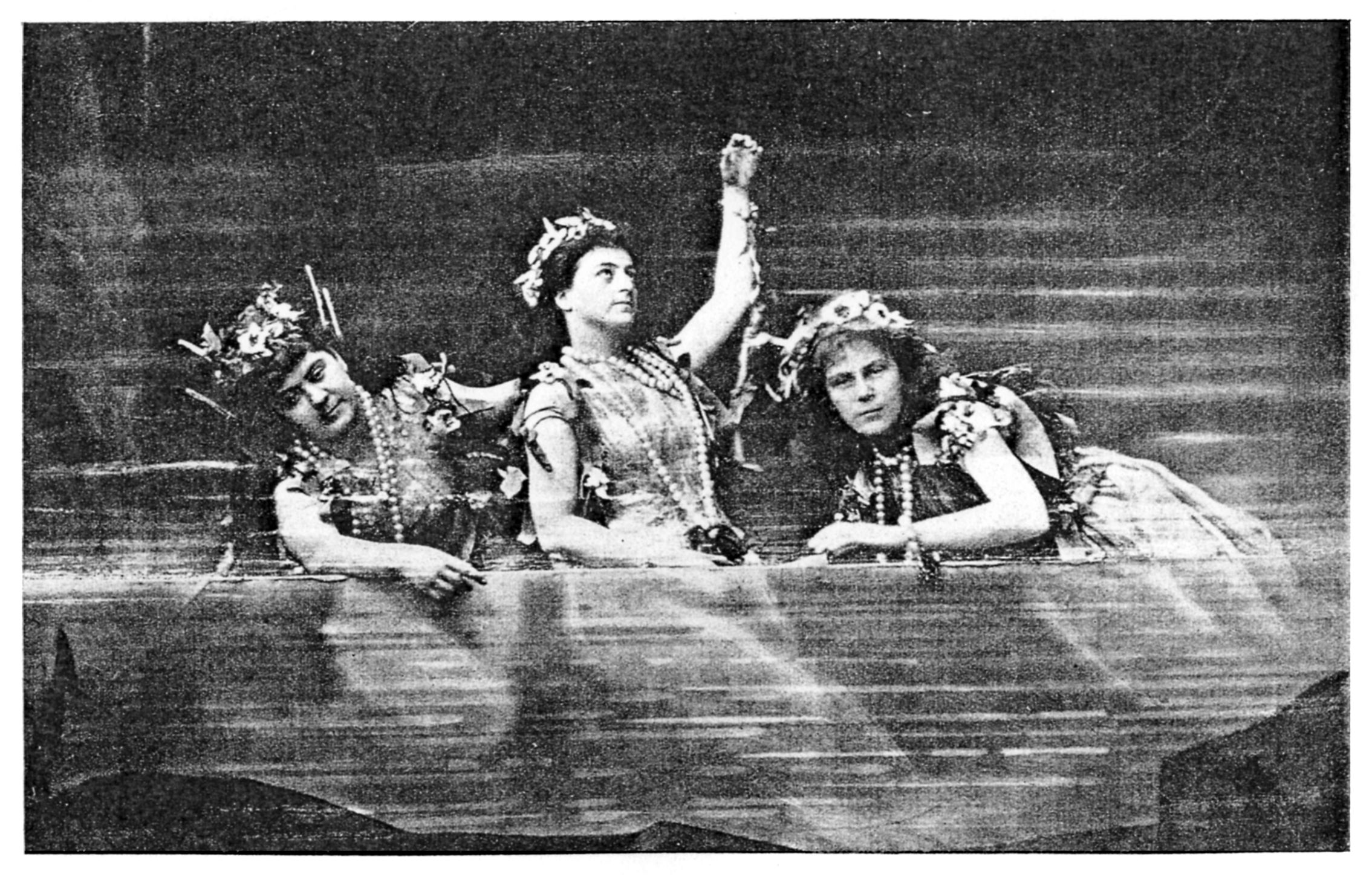
- The Rhinemaidens in Bayreuth in 1876, in the first production of Wagner's Der Ring des Nibelungen, from left: Minna Lammert, Lilli Lehmann, Marie Lehmann
- Born: 16 February 1852; Sondershausen, Germany
- Died: 1921 (aged 68–69); Berlin
- Other names: Minna Lammert-Tamm; Minna Tamm
- Education: Leipzig Conservatory
- Occupation: Operatic mezzo-soprano
- Organizations: Hoftheater, Berlin; Bayreuth Festival

Minna Lammert (16 February 1852 – 1921), also Minna Lammert-Tamm and Minna Tamm, was a German operatic mezzo-soprano. For decades a singer of the Hoftheater in Berlin, she appeared in the first complete performance of Wagner's Der Ring des Nibelungen at the first Bayreuth Festival in 1876 as one of the Rhinemaidens.

== Career ==
Born in Sondershausen, Lammert appeared as a soloist in a church performances already at age ten. After voice training at the conservatories of Coburg and Leipzig, she was engaged at the Hoftheater, the court theatre of her home town, making her debut in 1872, as Leonore in Beethoven's Fidelio.

She was from 1873 until her retirement in 1896 a member of the Hoftheater in Berlin. She was known for roles in Wagner operas, such as Mary in Der fliegende Holländer, Ortrud in Lohengrin and Magdalena in Die Meistersinger, but also appeared as Azucena in Verdi's Der Troubadour and Fides im Meyerbeer's Der Prophet. She took part in the premieres of Anton Rubinstein's Die Maccabäer on 11 April 1875, and of Theobald Rehbaum's Turandot on 11 April 1888. Other roles included Gertrud in Marschner's Hans Heiling, Nancy in Flotow's Martha, Irmentraut in Lortzing's Der Waffenschmied, Margarethe in Boieldieu's Die weiße Dame, the Marquise in Donizetti's Die Regimentstochter, and Karin in Edmund Kretschmer's Die Volkunger.

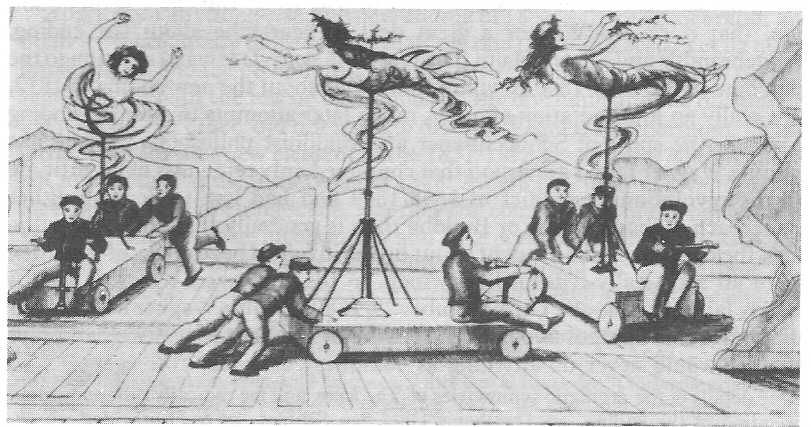
Stage machinery for Das Rheingold at the first Bayreuth Festival

At the first Bayreuth Festival, from 13 to 17 August 1876, she appeared as Rossweiße and Floßhilde in the first complete performance of Der Ring des Nibelungen. The other two Rhinemaidens were Lilli Lehmann and her sister Marie Lehmann. Lilli Lehmann described in her memoirs Lammert as highly musical ("urmusikalisch"), and her voice as velvety ("sammetweich"). During the performance, the singers simulated swimming with the aid of machinery conceived by Wagner, which had presented some initial difficulties in the execution. After the opening scene was first tried, stage assistant Richard Fricke wrote in his diary that Wagner "thanked them with tears of joy".

Lammert was married in 1878 to the Sanitätsrat (distinguished medical doctor) Dr. Tamm, and also appeared with her married name, Minna Lammert-Tamm. She died in Berlin.
