= Rhinemaidens =

Group of fictional characters from Richard Wagner's "Der Ring des Nibelungen"

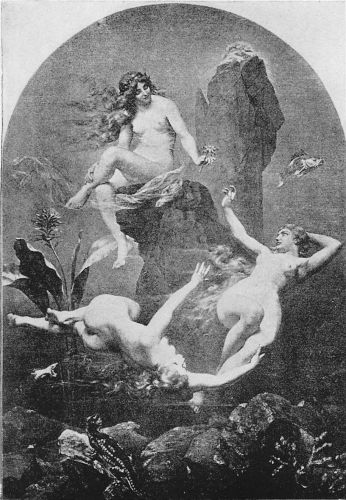
The three Rhinemaidens at play in the waters of the Rhine. Illustration from Stories of the Wagner Opera by H. A. Guerber, 1905.

The Rhinemaidens are the three nixie sisters (Rheintöchter or "Rhine daughters") who appear in Richard Wagner's opera cycle Der Ring des Nibelungen. Their individual names are Woglinde, Wellgunde and Flosshilde, although they are generally treated as a single entity and they act together accordingly. Of the 34 characters in the Ring cycle, they are the only ones who did not originate in the Old Norse Eddas. Wagner created his Rhinemaidens from other legends and myths, most notably the Nibelungenlied which contains stories involving water sprites (nixies) or mermaids of the Danube.

The key concepts associated with the Rhinemaidens in the Ring operas—their flawed guardianship of the Rhine gold, and the condition (the renunciation of love) through which the gold could be stolen from them and then transformed into a means of obtaining world power—are wholly Wagner's own invention, and are the elements that initiate and propel the entire drama.

The Rhinemaidens are the first and the last characters seen in the four-opera cycle, appearing both in the opening scene of Das Rheingold, and in the final climactic spectacle of Götterdämmerung, when they rise from the Rhine waters to reclaim the ring from Brünnhilde's ashes. They have been described as morally innocent, yet they display a range of sophisticated emotions, including some that are far from guileless. Seductive and elusive, they have no relationship to any of the other characters, and no indication is given as to how they came into existence, beyond occasional references to an unspecified "father".

The various musical themes associated with the Rhinemaidens are regarded as among the most lyrical in the entire Ring cycle, bringing to it rare instances of comparative relaxation and charm. The music contains important melodies and phrases which are reprised and developed elsewhere in the operas to characterise other individuals and circumstances, and to relate plot developments to the source of the narrative. It is reported that Wagner played the Rhinemaidens' lament at the piano, on the night before he died in Venice, in 1883.

== Origins ==
Alone of the Ring's characters, the Rhinemaidens do not originate from the Poetic Edda or Prose Edda, the Icelandic sources for most of Norse mythology. Water-sprites (German: Nixen) appear in many European myths and legends, often but not invariably in a form of disguised malevolence. Wagner drew widely and loosely from those legends when compiling his Ring narrative, and the probable origin of his Rhinemaidens is in the German Nibelungenlied. In one part of the Nibelungenlied narrative Hagen and Gunther encounter certain mermaids or water sprites (Middle High German: merwîp; mod. Ger.: Meerweib) bathing themselves in the waters of the Danube. Hagen steals their clothes, and seeking their return, the mermaid called Hadeburg gives false prophecy that Hagen and Gunther will find honor and glory when they enter Etzel's kingdom. But afterwards another mermaid, Sigelinde (a name Wagner would adopt again for use elsewhere), tells Hagen her aunt has lied. If they go to Etzel's land, they will die there. (Note: Mowatt renders "my sister lied" but the original text has MHG muome, mod. German Muhme which means "aunt (on the mother's side).)

The placement of this scene has several possibilities, but according to Þiðrekssaga, it occurred at the (non-existent) confluence of the Danube and the Rhine. Möringen, where the doomed warriors subsequently ferried across may be Möhringen an der Donau, although Großmehring which is much further east has also been suggested.

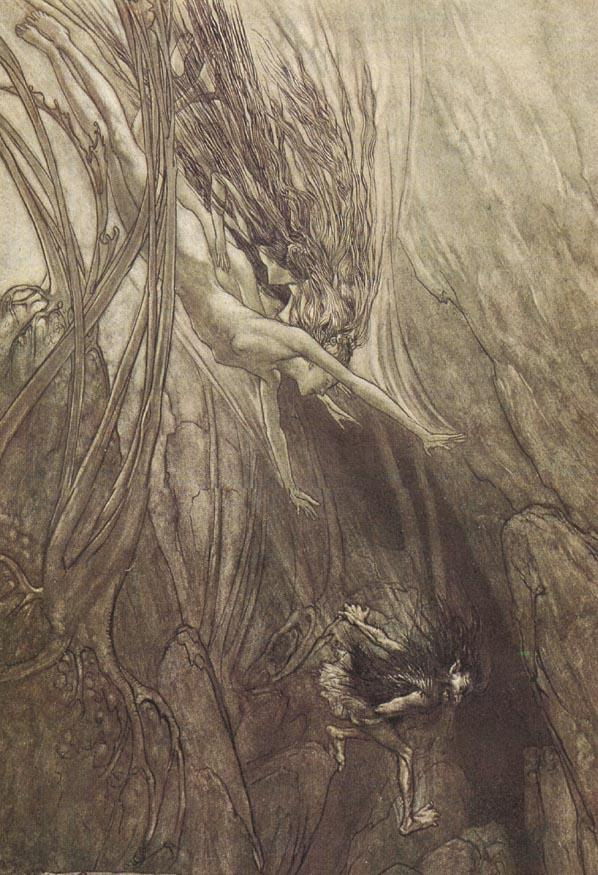
Alberich steals the gold: Das Rheingold, Scene I – part of a series of Ring illustrations by Arthur Rackham.

This story, itself unrelated to the Ring drama, is echoed by Wagner both in the opening Das Rheingold scene and in the first scene in Act III of Götterdämmerung. Wagner first adapted the story for use in his early libretto of Siegfried's Death (which eventually became Götterdämmerung), introducing three unnamed water-maids (Wasserjungfrauen), (Note: The number of sprites in the Nibelungenlied plot is not specified. Two are named, and the text suggests the possibility of a third.) and locating them in the Rhine, where they warn Siegfried of his impending death. Later these water-maids became Rhinemaidens (Rheintöchter), and were given individual names: Flosshilde, Wellgunde, and Bronnlinde. As Wagner continued working on his reverse chronology from Siegfried's death, he arrived at what he determined was the initial act of the drama—Alberich's theft of the Rhine gold. Believing that a simple abduction of the unguarded gold would lack dramatic force, Wagner made the Rhinemaidens the guardians of the gold, and he introduced the "renunciation of love" condition. Bronnlinde became Woglinde, probably to avoid confusion with Brünnhilde.

Wagner may also have been influenced by the Rhine River-based German legend of Lorelei, the lovelorn young maiden who drowns herself in the river and becomes a siren, luring fishermen onto the rocks by her singing. Further possible sources lie in Greek mythology and literature. Similarities exist between the maiden guardians in the Hesperides myth and the Rhinemaidens of Das Rheingold; three females guard a highly desired golden treasure that is stolen in the telling of each tale. Wagner was an enthusiastic reader of Aeschylus, including his Prometheus Bound which has a chorus of Oceanids or water nymphs. One author, Rudolph Sabor, sees a link between the Oceanids' treatment of Prometheus and the Rhinemaidens' initial tolerance of Alberich. Just as in Greek myth the Oceanids are the daughters of the titan sea god Oceanus, in Norse mythology—specifically the Poetic Edda—the jötunn (similar to a giant) sea god Ægir has nine daughters. The name of one of these means "wave" (Welle in German) and is a possible source for Wellgunde's name.

Wagner's operas do not reveal where the Rhinemaidens came from, or whether they have any connection to other characters. Whereas most of the characters in the cycle are inter-related, through birth, marriage, or sometimes both, (Note: Exceptions are Fasolt and Fafner who are only related to each other, and the Woodbird who is alone.) the Rhinemaidens are seemingly independent. The identity of their father who entrusted them with the guardianship of the gold is not given in the text. Some Wagnerian scholars have suggested that he may be a "Supreme Being" who is the father of Wotan and all the gods—indeed, of all creation. Others take the German Rheintöchter literally and say that they are the daughters of the Rhine River.

== Nature and attributes ==
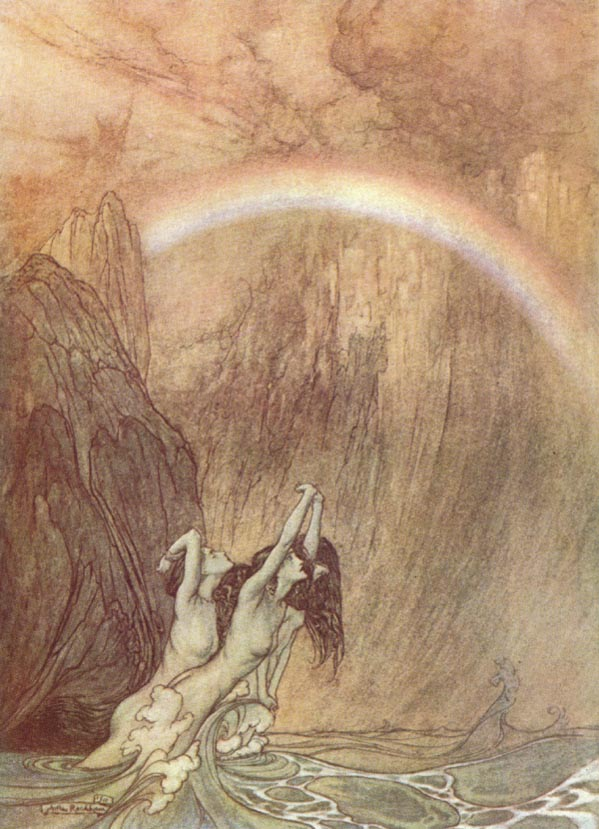
The Rhinemaidens lament the loss of the gold as, far above, the gods cross the rainbow bridge into Valhalla. Das Rheingold, Scene IV (Arthur Rackham).

The Rhinemaidens have been described as the drama's "most seductive but most elusive characters", and in one analysis as representatives of "seduction by infantile fantasy". They act essentially as a unity, with a composite yet elusive personality. Apart from Flosshilde's implied seniority, demonstrated by occasional light rebukes and illustrated musically by awarding the role to a deeper-voiced contralto or mezzo, their characters are undifferentiated. In The Perfect Wagnerite, his 1886 analysis of the Ring drama as political allegory, George Bernard Shaw describes the Rhinemaidens as "thoughtless, elemental, only half-real things, very much like modern young ladies". The attributes most apparent initially are charm and playfulness, combined with a natural innocence; their joy in the gold they guard derives from its beauty alone, even though they know its latent power. The veneer of childlike simplicity is misleading; aside from proving themselves irresponsible as guardians, they are also provocative, sarcastic and cruel in their interaction with Alberich. When the demigod Loge reports that the Rhinemaidens need Wotan's help to regain the gold, Fricka, the goddess of marriage, calls them a "watery brood" (Wassergezücht) and complains about the many men they have lured away with their "treacherous bathing". They are beguiling and flirtatious with Siegfried, but finally wise as revealed by the undisclosed counsel which they give to Brünnhilde. Sabor sees the personality of the Rhinemaidens as a blend of the "good hearted nature" of the Oceanids and the "austerity" (including the willingness to drown people) of the daughters of Ægir.

The first lines sung by Woglinde in the Ring are dominated by wordless vocalisations. Weia! Waga! ... Wagala weia! Wallala weiala weia! This attracted comment both at the 1869 premiere of Rheingold and the 1876 premiere of the entire Ring, with Wagner's work being dismissed as "Wigalaweia-Musik". In a letter to Nietzsche dated 12 June 1872, Wagner explained that he had derived Weiawaga from old German and that it was related to Weihwasser, meaning holy water. Other words were intended as parallels to those found in German nursery lullabies ('Eia Poppeia', 'Heija Poppeia' and 'Aia Bubbeie' are common forms). Thus Woglinde's lines portray both the childish innocence of the Rhinemaidens and the holiness of Nature.

The Rhinemaidens' sorrow in the loss of the gold is deep and heartfelt. As the gods are crossing the rainbow bridge into Valhalla at the end of Das Rheingold, Loge ironically suggests that, in the absence of the gold, the maidens should "bask in the gods' new-found radiance". The maidens' lament then becomes a stern reproof: "Tender and true are only the depths", they sing; "False and cowardly is all that rejoices up there". In the final Götterdämmerung scene they show ruthlessness as, having recovered the ring, they drag the hapless Hagen down into the waters of the Rhine.

The Rhinemaidens are the only prominent characters seen definitely alive at the end of the drama; the fates of a few others are ambiguous, but most have certainly perished. Despite the relative brevity of their roles in the context of the four-opera cycle, they are key figures; their careless guardianship of the gold and their provocation of Alberich are the factors which determine all that follows. Wagner himself devised the "renunciation of love" provision whereby the gold could be stolen and then used to forge a ring with power to rule the world. Since the ring is made from the stolen gold, only its restoration to the Rhinemaidens' care in the waters of the Rhine will lift the curse on it. Hence, the return of the stolen property provides a unifying thematic consistency to Wagner's complex story.

== Role in the Ring Operas ==
=== Das Rheingold, Scene 1 ===
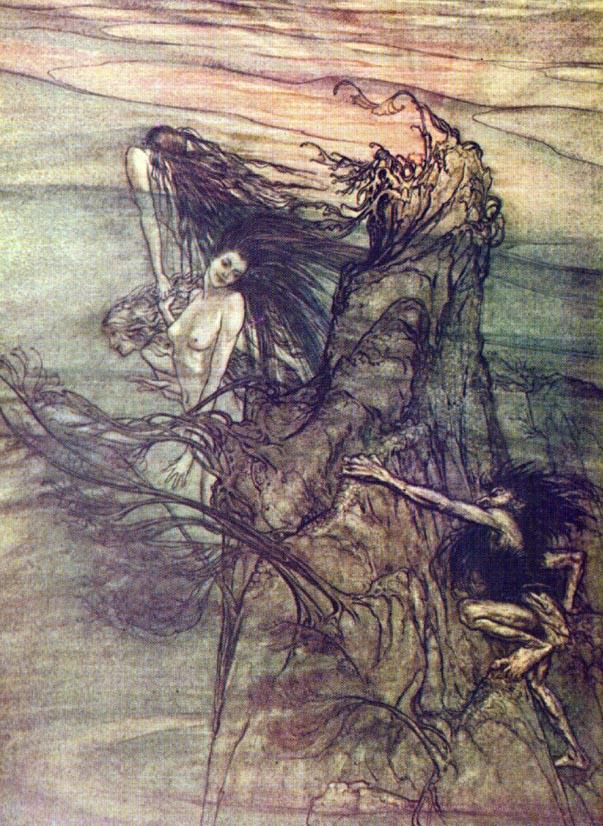
Alberich tries to reach the Rhinemaidens (Arthur Rackham)

As the musical prelude climaxes, Woglinde and Wellgunde are seen at play in the depths of the Rhine. Flosshilde joins them after a gentle reminder of their responsibilities as guardians of the gold. They are observed by the Nibelung dwarf Alberich who calls out to them: "I'd like to draw near if you would be kind to me". The wary Flosshilde cries: "Guard the gold! Father warned us of such a foe". When Alberich begins his rough wooing the maidens relax: "Now I laugh at my fears, our enemy is in love", says Flosshilde, and a cruel teasing game ensues. First, Woglinde pretends to respond to the dwarf's advances but swims away as he tries to embrace her. Then Wellgunde takes over, and Alberich's hopes rise until her sharp retort: "Ugh, you hairy hunchbacked clown!" Flosshilde pretends to chastise her sisters for their cruelty and feigns her own courtship, by which Alberich is quite taken in until she suddenly tears away to join the others in a mocking song. Tormented with lust, Alberich furiously chases the maidens over the rocks, slipping and sliding as they elude him, before he sinks down in impotent rage. At this point the mood changes: as a sudden brightness penetrates the depths, a magical golden light reveals, for the first time, the Rhinegold on its rock. The maidens sing their ecstatic greeting to the gold, which rouses Alberich's curiosity. In response to his question Woglinde and Wellgunde reveal the gold's secret: measureless power would belong to the one who could forge a ring from it. Flosshilde scolds them for giving this secret away, but her concerns are dismissed—only someone who has forsworn love can obtain the gold, and Alberich is clearly so besotted as to present no danger. But their confidence is misplaced; in his humiliation Alberich decides that world mastery is more desirable than love. As the maidens continue to jeer his antics he scrambles up the rock and, uttering a curse on love, seizes the gold and disappears, leaving the Rhinemaidens to dive after him bewailing their loss.

=== Das Rheingold, Scene 4 ===
As Wotan, Fricka and the other gods start to cross the rainbow bridge leading to Valhalla, they hear a melancholy song from the depths of the Rhine—the maidens, mourning the loss of the gold. Embarrassed and irritated, Wotan tells Loge to silence the maidens, but as the gods continue across the bridge the lament rises again, now with bitter words of reproach to the gods for their heartlessness.

=== Götterdämmerung, Act 3 Scene 1 ===
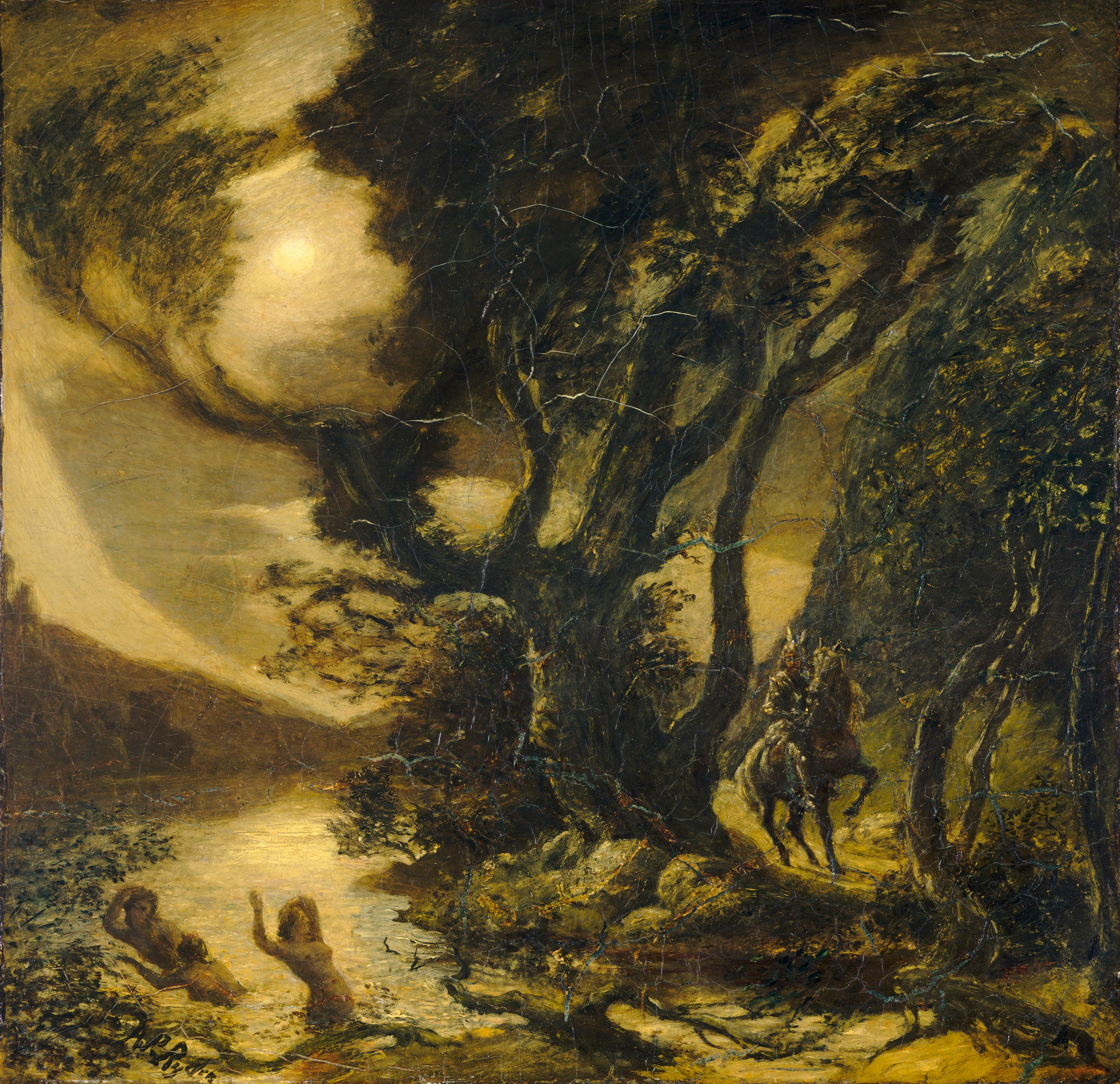
Siegfried encounters the Rhinemaidens. Oil on canvas by Albert Pinkham Ryder, c. 1875–1891

Some time has passed (at least two generations). In a remote wooded valley where the Rhine flows, the ageless Rhinemaidens continue to mourn for the gold, pleading with the "Sun-woman" to send them a champion who will return the gold to them. Siegfried's horn is heard, and he soon appears, having lost his way while hunting. The maidens greet him with their old playfulness and offer to help him, for the price of the ring on his finger. After a flirtatious exchange, Siegfried offers, apparently sincerely, to give them the ring. But instead of wisely simply accepting his offer, the mood of the naive, formerly flirtatious Rhinemaidens suddenly becomes solemn: they warn Siegfried he will be killed that very day unless he delivers the ring to them. But brave Siegfried will never submit to any such implied threat and declares: "By threatening my life and limb, even if it weren't worth as much as a finger, you won't get the ring from me!" The maidens are scornful of his folly: "Farewell, Siegfried. A proud woman will today become your heir, scoundrel! She'll give us a better hearing". Siegfried is not aware that it is to Brünnhilde that they refer. They swim off, leaving a puzzled Siegfried to ponder their words and to admit to himself that he could happily have seduced any one of them.

=== Götterdämmerung, Act 3 Scene 3 ===
In her final soliloquy, Brünnhilde thanks the Rhinemaidens for their "good advice". They have apparently told her the full story of Siegfried's ensnarement and betrayal, and advised that only the return of the ring to the waters of the Rhine can lift its curse. Brünnhilde sings: "What you desire I will give you: from my ashes take it to yourselves. The fire...will cleanse the curse from the ring". She exhorts the Rhinemaidens to "carefully guard it" in the future, then leaps into the flames of Siegfried's pyre. The fire blazes up to fill the stage, representing the destruction of the gods. As the Rhine overflows its banks the Rhinemaidens appear, making for the ring. Hagen, who covets the ring, shouts to them "Get back from the ring!" (Zurück vom Ring!), the last words of the drama. He is seized by Woglinde and Wellgunde and dragged into the Rhine's depths, as Flosshilde grabs the ring, holds it aloft, and joins her sisters swimming in circles as the waters of the Rhine gradually subside.

== Rhinemaidens' music ==
The music associated with the Rhinemaidens has been portrayed by the Wagner commentator James Holman as "some of the seminal music in the Ring"; other descriptions have noted its relative charm and relaxation.

In Woglinde's opening song to the Rhine: "Weia! Waga! Woge, du Welle,..." (Das Rheingold, Scene 1) the melody is pentatonic, using the notes E flat, F, A flat, B flat and C. The song begins with a two-note falling step (F followed by E flat), a figure which recurs in many musical motives throughout the Ring. The melody itself is reprised during Fricka's denunciation of the Rhinemaidens in Das Rheingold, Scene 2 and, dramatically, at the end of Götterdämmerung when, after Brünnhilde's immolation, the Rhinemaidens rise from the river to claim the ring from Siegfried's funeral pyre. Its first five notes, with an altered rhythm, become the motive of the sleeping Brünnhilde in Die Walküre, Act 3. A variant of the tune becomes the Woodbird's greeting "Hei! Siegfried" in Act 2 of Siegfried. The Rhinemaidens and the Woodbird, in Deryck Cooke's analysis, are related through nature, as "fundamentally innocent allies of the natural world".

The "Rhinemaidens' joy and greeting to the gold": "Heiajaheia, Heiajaheia! Wallalallalala leiajahei! Rheingold! Rheingold!..." (Das Rheingold Scene 1) is a triumphant greeting song based on two elements, which are developed and transformed later in the Ring and put to many uses. For example, the joyful "heiajaheia" cries are converted, in Rheingold Scene 2, into a dark minor version as Loge reports the theft of the gold to the gods and the consequent rising power of the Nibelungen. The "Rheingold!" repetition is sung by the Rhinemaidens to the same falling step that marked the start of Woglinde's song. This figure recurs constantly in the later stages of the drama; in Das Rheingold Scene 3 a minor key version is used as a motive for the evil power of the ring that Alberich has forged from the gold. It comes to represent the theme of servitude to the ring; in Götterdämmerung, enslaved to the ring by his desire for it, Hagen utters his "Hoi-ho" call to his vassals using the same minor two-note figure.

The lament "Rheingold! Rheingold! Reines Gold!..." (Das Rheingold Scene 4) is sung by the maidens at the end of Das Rheingold, as the gods begin to cross the Rainbow Bridge into Valhalla. It begins with the music from the greeting, but develops into what Ernest Newman describes as a "haunting song of loss", which becomes increasingly poignant before it is drowned by the orchestral fortissimo that ends the opera. A slow version of the lament is played on the horns in Siegfried, Act 2, as Siegfried enters Fafner's cave to claim the gold—the lament, says Cooke, serves to remind us of the gold's true ownership. The lament is played spiritedly during the Götterdämmerung prologue, as part of the orchestral interlude known as Siegfried's Rhine Journey, before a shadow falls across the music as it descends into the minor key of the "servitude" motive.

Newman describes the Rhinemaidens' scene with Siegfried": Frau Sonne..." and "Weilalala leia..." (Götterdämmerung, Act 3 Scene 1), as a "gracious woodland idyll". The musical elements associated with the Rhinemaidens in this scene have not previously been heard; Holman describes them as alluding to the maidens' seductive nature, as well as conveying a sense of nostalgia and detachment, as the drama approaches its conclusion.

== On stage ==
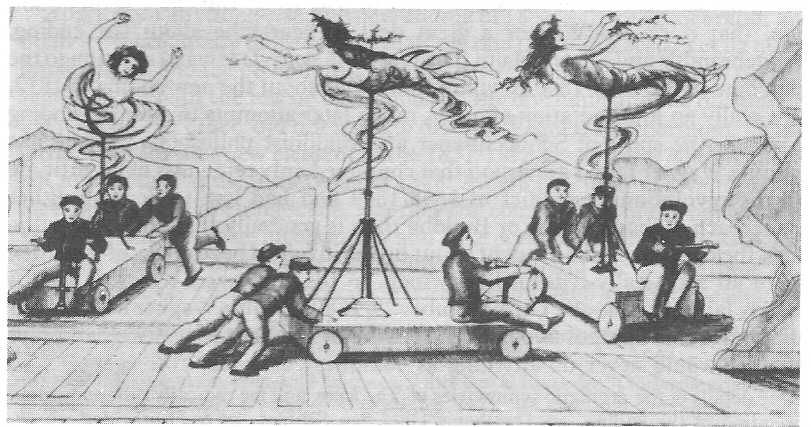
A contemporary picture of the machinery used for the swimming Rhinemaidens at the 1876 premiere of the Ring, as seen from backstage

From the first complete production of the Ring, at the Bayreuth Festspielhaus in 1876, it was established that the Rhinemaidens should be depicted in conventional human form, rather than as mermaids or with other supernatural features, notwithstanding Alberich's insult to Wellgunde: "Frigid bony fish!" (Kalter, grätiger Fisch!). The staging of their scenes has always been a test of ingenuity and imagination, since Wagner's stage directions include much swimming and diving and other aquatic gymnastics. Traditionally, therefore, much use has been made of backdrops and lighting to achieve the necessary watery effects. Until the Second World War, under the influence of Cosima Wagner and her (and Wagner's) son Siegfried, a policy of "stifling conservatism" was applied to Bayreuth stagings of the Ring operas. Although there had been some innovation in productions staged elsewhere, it was not until the postwar revival of the Festival in 1951 that there were any significant changes in Bayreuth's presentation of the Ring operas. Since 1976, in particular, innovation at the Festival and elsewhere has been substantial and imaginative.

In the original 1876 production, the Rhinemaidens were wheeled around on stands behind semi-transparent screens. The stage machinery and the lighting effects were designed by Carl Brandt, who was the foremost stage technician of the time. One innovation which Cosima did eventually approve was the replacement of the wheeled stands with giant, invisible "fishing rods" on which the Rhinemaidens were dangled. Wires continued to be used in the Bayreuth productions of Siegfried Wagner and, later, those of his widow Winifred, who ran the Bayreuth Festival until the end of the Second World War. Similar techniques have been used in more modern productions. In the 1996 Lyric Opera of Chicago Ring cycle, repeated in 2004–05, the Rhinemaidens were suspended on bungee cords anchored in the fly space above the stage, enabling them to dive up and down, as intended by Wagner. The Rhinemaidens were played on-stage by gymnasts, mouthing words sung by singers standing in a corner of the stage.

Keith Warner's Covent Garden production uses lighting to convey the impression of being underwater and nudity to display the natural innocence of the Rhinemaidens.

The 1951 Festival production, by Siegfried's and Winifred's son Wieland, broke with tradition and featured an austere staging which replaced scenery and props with skilful lighting effects. The Rhinemaidens, along with all the other characters, were plainly dressed in simple robes, and sang their roles without histrionics. Thus the music and the words became the main focus of attention. Wieland was influenced by Adolphe Appia, whose Notes sur l'Anneau du Nibelungen (1924–25) had been dismissed by Cosima: "Appia seems to be unaware that the Ring was performed here in 1876. It follows that the staging is definitive and sacrosanct." Wieland and his brother Wolfgang praised Appia: "the stylised stage, inspired by the music and the realisation of three-dimensional space – constitute the initial impulses for a reform of operatic stagings which led quite logically to the 'New Bayreuth' style."

The innovative centenary Bayreuth Ring, directed by Patrice Chéreau, did away altogether with the underwater concept by setting the Rhinemaiden scenes in the lee of a large hydro-electric dam, as part of a 19th-century Industrial Revolution setting for the operas. For the scene with Siegfried in Götterdämmerung, Chéreau altered the perpetual youth aspect of the Rhine Maidens by depicting them as "no longer young girls merrily disporting themselves; they have become tired, grey, careworn, and ungainly". Since this production "the assumption of unrestricted interpretive license has become the norm". For example, Nikolaus Lehnhoff, in his 1987 Bayerische Staatsoper production, placed the Rhinemaidens in a salon and had their lament at the end of Rheingold played on a gramophone by Loge.

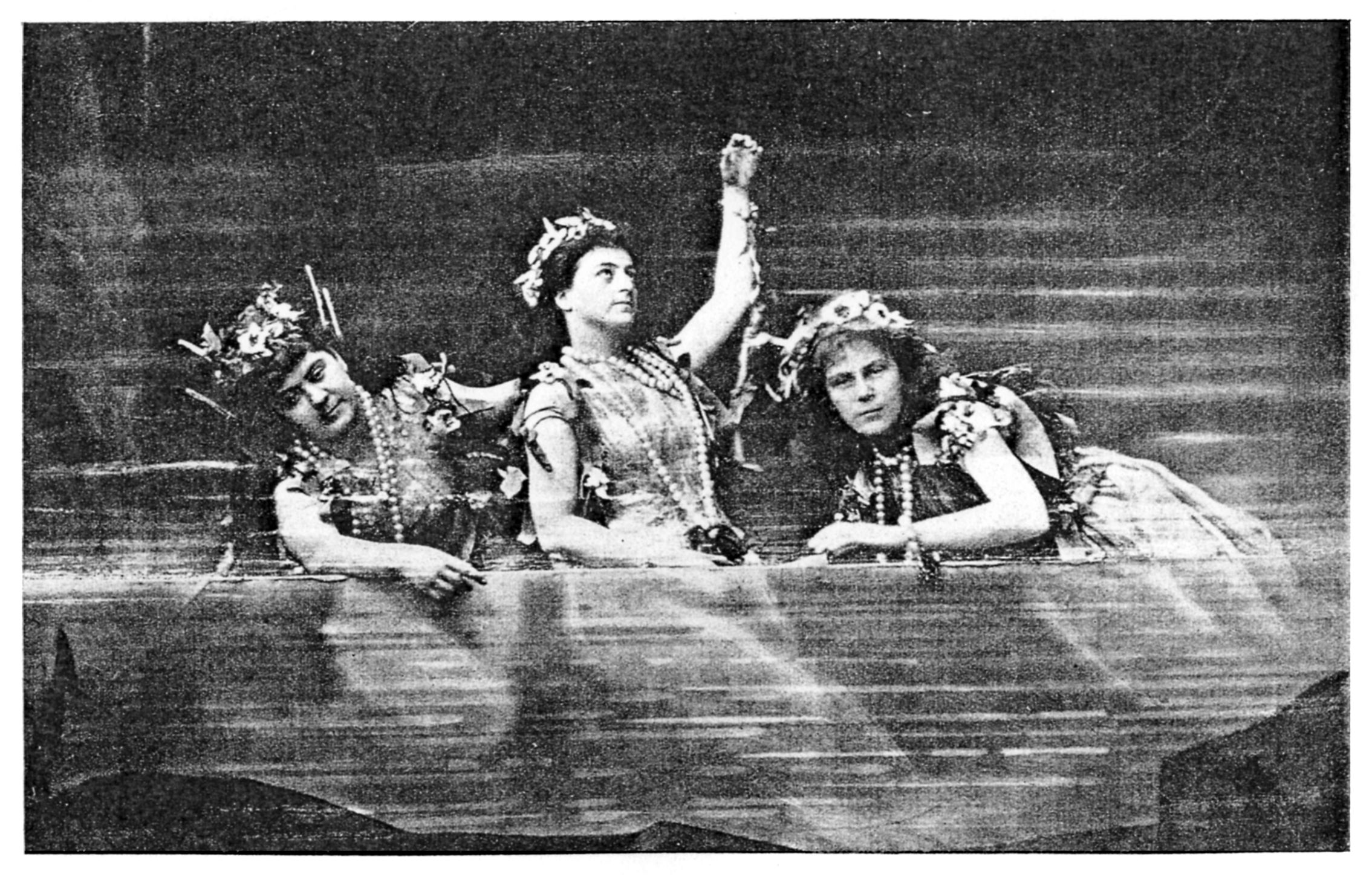
The 1876 premiere cast of the Ring included Lilli Lehmann (centre) as Woglinde. She was the first of many significant singers to play one of the Rhinemaidens.

Peter Hall directed the Bayreuth Ring after Chéreau. His version, staged 1983–86, portrayed the natural innocence of the Rhinemaidens in the simplest of ways; they were naked. Keith Warner adapted this feature in his Ring production for the Royal Opera House Covent Garden, first staged 2004–06. A Covent Garden spokesman explained "The maidens are children of innocence, a vision of nature – and as soon as someone appears they hastily throw on some clothes to protect their modesty." While Warner relies on lighting to achieve an underwater effect, Hall used a Pepper's ghost illusion: mirrors at a 45° angle made the Rhinemaidens appear to swim vertically when the performers were in fact swimming horizontally in a shallow basin.

Although the roles of the Rhinemaidens are relatively small, they have been sung by notable singers better known for performing major roles in Wagnerian and other repertoire. The first person to sing the part of Woglinde in full was Lilli Lehmann at Bayreuth in 1876. In 1951, when the Bayreuth Festival re-opened after the Second World War, the same part was taken by Elisabeth Schwarzkopf. Other Bayreuth Rhinemaidens include Helga Dernesch who sang Wellgunde there between 1965 and 1967. Lotte Lehmann played Wellgunde at the Hamburg State Opera between 1912 and 1914 and the Vienna State Opera in 1916. Recorded Rhinemaidens have included Sena Jurinac for Furtwängler and RAI, Lucia Popp and Gwyneth Jones for Georg Solti, and Helen Donath and Edda Moser for Karajan.

== See also ==
- Nine Daughters of Ægir and Rán - nine goddesses who personify the waves in Norse mythology
