= Das Rheingold =

1869 opera by Richard Wagner

- Music drama by Richard Wagner
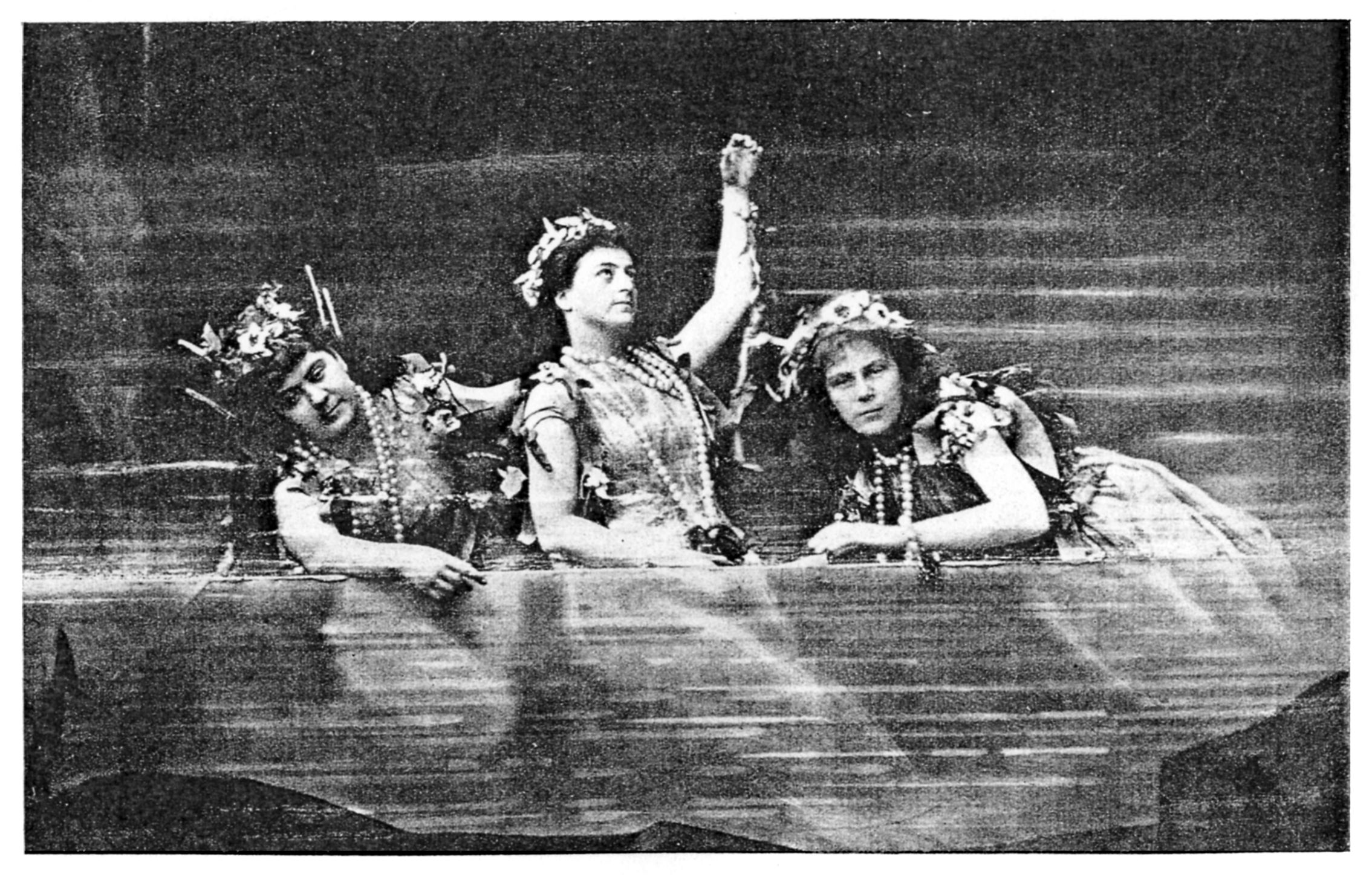
- The Rhinemaidens in the first Bayreuth production of Das Rheingold, 1876. l to r: Minna Lammert (Floßhilde); Lilli Lehmann (Woglinde); Marie Lehmann (Wellgunde)
- Librettist: Richard Wagner
- Language: German
- Based on: Nordic and German legends
- Premiere: 22 September 1869; National Theatre Munich

Das Rheingold (German: [das ˈʁaɪnɡɔlt]; The Rhinegold), WWV 86A, is the first of the four epic music dramas that constitute Richard Wagner's cycle Der Ring des Nibelungen (English: The Ring of the Nibelung). It premiered as a single opera at the National Theatre of Munich on 22 September 1869, and received its first performance as part of the Ring cycle at the Bayreuth Festspielhaus on 13 August 1876.

Wagner wrote the Ring librettos in reverse order, so that Das Rheingold was the last of the texts to be written; it was, however, the first to be set to music. The score was completed in 1854, but Wagner was unwilling to sanction its performance until the whole cycle was complete; he worked intermittently on this music until 1874. The 1869 Munich premiere of Das Rheingold was staged, against Wagner's wishes, on the orders of King Ludwig II of Bavaria, his patron. Following its 1876 Bayreuth premiere, the Ring cycle was introduced into the worldwide repertory, with performances in all the main opera houses, in which it has remained a regular and popular fixture.

In his 1851 essay Opera and Drama, Wagner had set out new principles as to how music dramas should be constructed, under which the conventional forms of opera (arias, ensembles, choruses) were rejected. Rather than providing word-settings, the music would interpret the text emotionally, reflecting the feelings and moods behind the work, by using a system of recurring leitmotifs to represent people, ideas and situations. Das Rheingold was Wagner's first work that adopted these principles, and his most rigid adherence to them, despite a few deviations – the Rhinemaidens frequently sing in ensemble.

As the "preliminary evening" within the cycle, Das Rheingold gives the background to the events that drive the main dramas of the cycle. It recounts Alberich's theft of the Rhine gold after his renunciation of love; his fashioning of the all-powerful ring from the gold and his enslavement of the Nibelungs; Wotan's seizure of the gold and the ring, to pay his debt to the giants who have built his fortress Valhalla; Alberich's curse on the ring and its possessors; Erda's warning to Wotan to forsake the ring; the early manifestation of the curse's power after Wotan yields the ring to the giants; and the gods' uneasy entry into Valhalla, under the shadow of their impending doom.

== Background and context ==
Structure of the Ring cycle

1. Das Rheingold
2. Die Walküre
3. Siegfried
4. Götterdämmerung

Having completed his opera Lohengrin in April 1848, Richard Wagner chose as his next subject Siegfried, the legendary hero of Germanic myth. In October of that year he prepared a prose outline for Siegfried's Death, which during the following months he developed into a full libretto. After his flight from Dresden and relocation in Switzerland, he continued to develop and expand his Siegfried project, having decided meantime that a single work would not suffice for his purposes; in his enlarged concept, Siegfried's Death would be the culmination of a series of musical dramas incorporating a network of myths from his sources and imagination, each telling a stage of the story. In 1851 he outlined his purpose in his essay "A Communication to My Friends": "I propose to produce my myth in three complete dramas, preceded by a lengthy prelude (Vorspiel)." Each of these dramas would, he said, constitute an independent whole, but would not be performed separately. "At a specially-appointed Festival, I propose, some future time, to produce those three dramas with their prelude, in the course of three days and a fore-evening.

In accordance with this scheme, Siegfried's Death, much revised from its original form, eventually became Götterdämmerung (The Twilight of the Gods). It was preceded by the story of Siegfried's youth, Young Siegfried, later renamed Siegfried, itself preceded by Die Walküre (The Valkyrie). Finally, to these three works Wagner added a prologue which he named Das Rheingold.

== Roles ==
Role	Description	Voice type	Munich premiere cast Conductor: Franz Wüllner	Cast in premiere of complete cycle Conductor: Hans Richter
Gods
Wotan	God of battle, and of contracts, ruler of the gods	bass-baritone	August Kindermann	Franz Betz
Loge	Demi-god of fire, Wotan's clever, manipulative executive servant	tenor	Heinrich Vogl	Heinrich Vogl
Fricka	Goddess of family values; wife to Wotan	dramatic mezzo-soprano	Sophie Stehle	Friederike Grün
Freia	Goddess of love and beauty, guardian of the golden apples; Fricka's sister	soprano	Henriette Müller-Marion	Marie Haupt
Froh	God of spring and sunshine; Freia's gentle brother	tenor	Franz Nachbaur	Georg Unger
Donner	God of thunder; Freia's hot-tempered brother	baritone	Karl Samuel Heinrich	Eugen Gura
Erda	Primal earth mother, goddess of earthly wisdom	contralto	Emma Seehofer	Luise Jaide
Nibelungs
Alberich	Power-hungry dwarf, lord of the Nibelungs	baritone	Karl Fischer	Karl Hill
Mime	Alberich's brother, a cowardly expert metal-smith	tenor	Max Schlosser	Max Schlosser
Giants
Fasolt	Giant, in love with Freia	bass	Toni Petzer	Albert Eilers
Fafner	Giant; Fasolt's ruthless brother	bass	Kaspar Bausewein	Franz von Reichenberg
Rhinemaidens
Woglinde	River-nymph	soprano	Anna Kaufmann	Lilli Lehmann
Wellgunde	River-nymph	soprano or mezzo-soprano	Therese Vogl	Marie Lehmann
Floßhilde	River-nymph	mezzo-soprano	Wilhelmine Ritter	Minna Lammert

== Synopsis ==
Prelude

=== Scene 1 ===
At the bottom of the Rhine, the three Rhinemaidens, Woglinde, Wellgunde, and Floßhilde, play together. Alberich, a Nibelung dwarf, appears from a deep chasm and tries to woo them. The maidens mock his advances and he grows angry. He chases them, but they elude, tease and humiliate him. A sudden ray of sunshine pierces the depths, to reveal the Rhinegold. The maidens rejoice in the gold's gleam. Alberich asks what it is. They explain that the gold, which their father has ordered them to guard, can be made into a magic ring which gives power to rule the world, if its bearer first renounces love. The maidens think they have nothing to fear from the lustful dwarf, but Alberich, embittered by their mockery, curses love, seizes the gold and returns to his chasm, leaving them screaming in dismay.

Orchestral interlude

=== Scene 2 ===
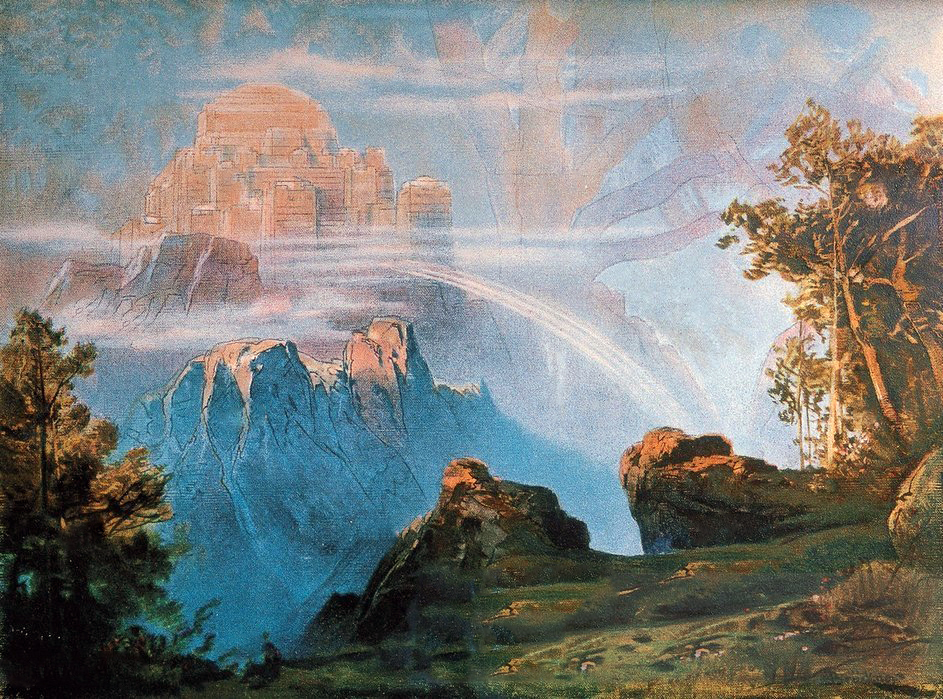
Wotan's fortress of Valhalla (Brückner, 1896)

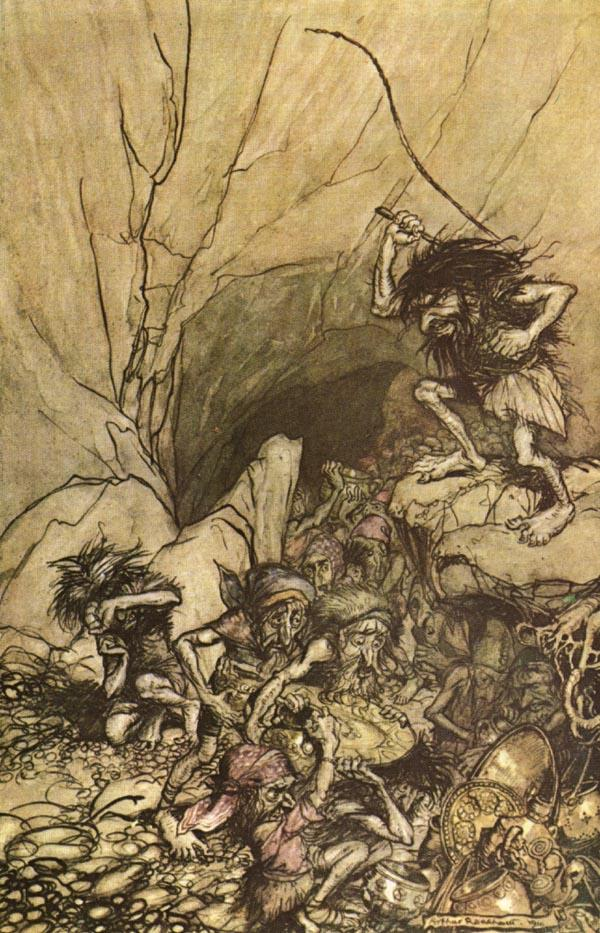
Alberich and the subjugated Nibelung dwarfs (illustration by Arthur Rackham, 1910)

Wotan, ruler of the gods, is asleep on a mountaintop, with a magnificent castle behind him. His wife, Fricka, wakes Wotan, who salutes their new home. Fricka reminds him of his promise to the giants Fasolt and Fafner, who built the castle, that he would give them Fricka's sister Freia, the goddess of youth and beauty, as payment. Fricka is worried for her sister, but Wotan trusts that Loge, the cunning demigod of fire, will find an alternative payment.

Freia enters in a panic, followed by Fasolt and Fafner. Fasolt demands that Freia be given up. He points out that Wotan's authority is sustained by the treaties carved into his spear, including his contract with the giants, which Wotan therefore cannot violate. Donner, god of thunder, and Froh, god of sunshine, arrive to defend Freia, but Wotan cannot permit the use of force to break the agreement. Hoping that Loge will arrive with the alternative payment he has promised, Wotan tries to stall.

When Loge arrives, his initial report is discouraging: nothing is more valuable to men than love, so there is apparently no possible alternative payment besides Freia. Loge was able to find only one instance where someone willingly gave up love for something else: Alberich the Nibelung has renounced love, stolen the Rhine gold, and made a powerful magic ring out of it. A discussion of the ring and its powers ensues, and everyone finds good reasons for wanting to own it. Fafner makes a counter-offer: the giants will accept the Nibelung's treasure in payment, instead of Freia. When Wotan tries to haggle, the giants depart, taking Freia with them as hostage and threatening to keep her forever unless the gods ransom her by obtaining and giving them the Nibelung's gold by the end of the day.

Freia's golden apples had kept the gods eternally young, but in her absence they begin to age and weaken. In order to redeem Freia, Wotan resolves to travel with Loge to Alberich's subterranean kingdom to obtain the gold.

Orchestral interlude – Abstieg nach Nibelheim (Descent into Nibelheim)

=== Scene 3 ===
In Nibelheim, Alberich has enslaved the rest of the Nibelung dwarves with the power of the ring. He has forced his brother Mime, a skillful smith, to create a magic helmet, the Tarnhelm. Alberich demonstrates the Tarnhelm's power by making himself invisible to better torment his subjects.

Wotan and Loge arrive and happen upon Mime, who tells them of the dwarves' misery under Alberich's rule. Alberich returns, driving his slaves to pile up a huge mound of gold. He boasts to the visitors about his plans to conquer the world using the power of the ring. Loge asks how he can protect himself against a thief while he sleeps. Alberich replies the Tarnhelm will hide him, by allowing him to turn invisible or change his form. Loge expresses doubt and requests a demonstration. Alberich complies by transforming himself into a giant snake; Loge acts suitably impressed, and then asks whether Alberich can also reduce his size, which would be very useful for hiding. Alberich transforms himself into a toad. Wotan and Loge seize him, tie his hands, and drag him up to the surface.

Orchestral Interlude - Aufstieg von Nibelheim (Ascent from Nibelheim)

=== Scene 4 ===
Back on the mountaintop, Wotan and Loge force Alberich to exchange his wealth for his freedom. He summons the Nibelungen, who bring up the hoard of gold. He then asks for the return of the Tarnhelm, but Loge says that it is part of his ransom. Alberich still hopes he can keep the ring, but Wotan demands it, and when Alberich refuses, Wotan tears it from Alberich's hand and puts it on his own finger. Crushed by his loss, Alberich lays a curse on the ring: until it returns to him, it will inspire restless jealousy in those who own it, and murderous envy in those who do not, thus condemning all the possessors of the ring.

The gods reconvene. Fasolt and Fafner return with Freia. Fasolt, reluctant to release her, insists that the gold be piled high enough to hide her from view. Wotan is forced to relinquish the Tarnhelm, to help cover Freia completely. However, Fasolt spots a remaining crack in the gold, through which one of Freia's eyes can be seen. Loge says that there is no more gold, but Fafner, who has noticed the ring on Wotan's finger, demands that Wotan add it to the pile, to block the crack. Loge protests that the ring belongs to the Rheinmaidens, and Wotan angrily declares that he intends to keep it for his own. As the giants seize Freia and start to leave, Erda, the earth goddess, appears and warns Wotan of impending doom, urging him to give up the cursed ring. Troubled, Wotan calls the giants back and surrenders the ring. The giants release Freia and begin dividing the treasure, but they quarrel over the ring itself. Fafner clubs Fasolt to death. Wotan, horrified, realizes that Alberich's curse has terrible power.

Donner summons a thunderstorm to clear the air, after which Froh creates a rainbow bridge that stretches to the gate of the castle. Wotan leads the gods across the bridge to the castle, which he names Valhalla. Loge, in an aside, remarks on their folly and considers burning them all, but he will think it over. Far below, the Rhinemaidens mourn the loss of their gold and condemn the gods as false and cowardly.

== Writing history ==
=== Text, sources, characters ===
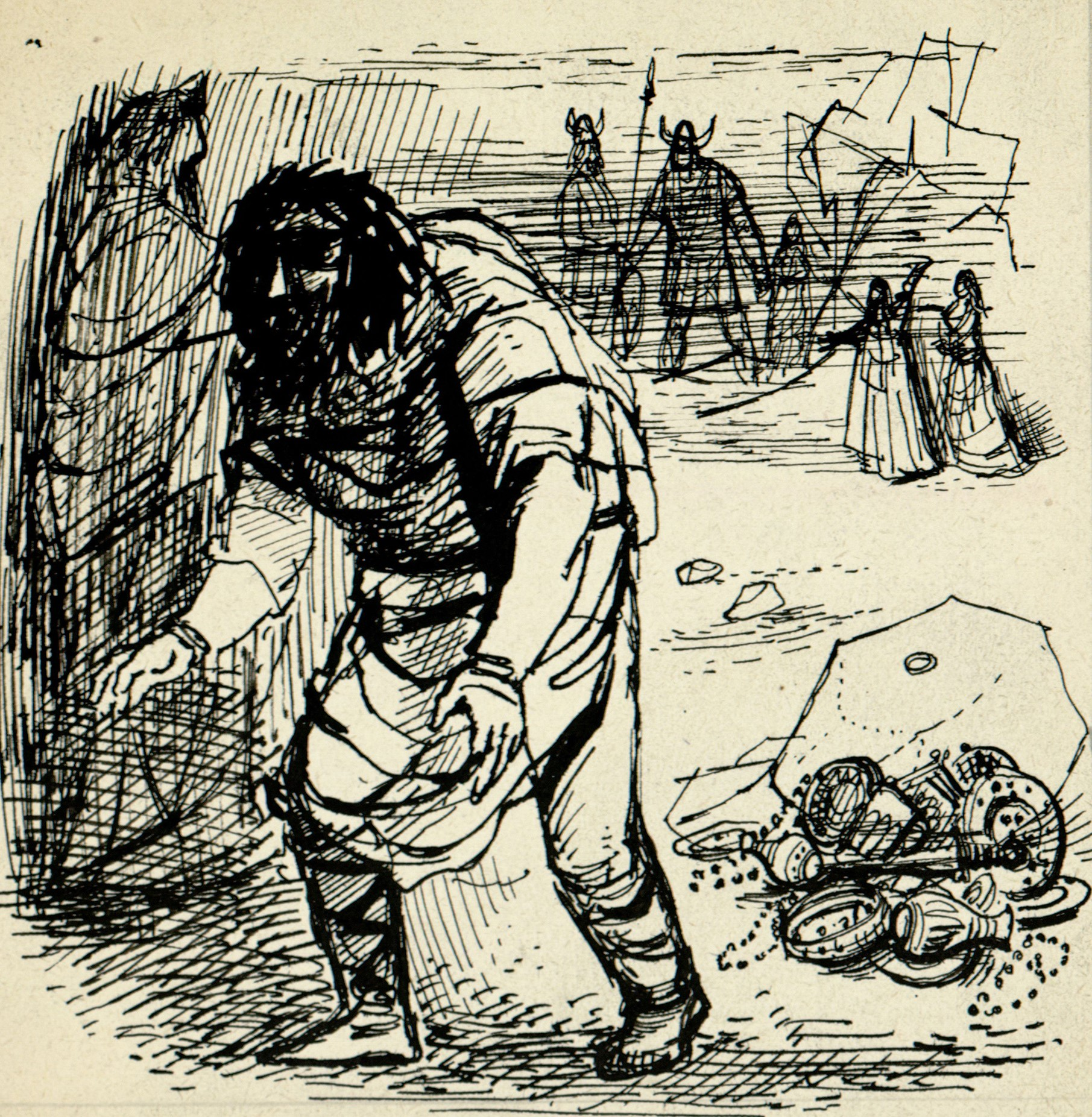
Libretto cover for Das Rheingold (Peter Hoffer)

Because Wagner developed his Ring scheme in reverse chronological order, the "poem" (libretto) for Das Rheingold was the last of the four to be written. He finished his prose plan for the work in March 1852, and on 15 September began writing the full libretto, which he completed on 3 November. In February 1853, at the Hotel Baur au Lac in Zürich, Wagner read the whole Ring text to an invited audience, after which all four parts were published in a private edition limited to 50 copies. The text was not published commercially until 1863.

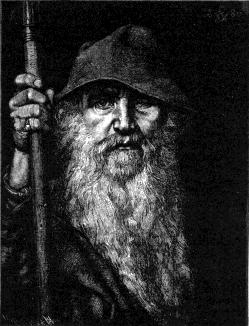
Wotan

Of the principal sources that Wagner used in creating the Ring cycle, the Scandinavian Eddas – the Poetic Edda and the Prose Edda – provided most of the material for Das Rheingold. These are poems and texts from 12th and 13th-century Iceland, which relate the doings of various Norse gods. Among these stories, a magic ring and a hoard of gold held by the dwarf Andvari (Wagner's Alberich) are stolen by the gods Odin (Wotan) and Loki (Loge) and used to redeem a debt to two brothers. One of these, Fafnir, kills his brother and turns himself into a dragon to guard the gold. The Eddas also introduce the gods Thor (Donner), Frey (Froh) and the goddesses Frigg (Fricka) and Freyja (Freia). The idea of Erda, the earth mother, may have been derived from the character Jord (meaning "Earth"), who appears in the Eddas as the mother of Thor.

A few Rhinegold characters originate from outside the Eddas. Mime appears in the Thidriks saga, as a human smith rather than as an enslaved Nibelung. The three Rhinemaidens do not appear in any of the sagas and are substantially Wagner's own invention; he also provided their individual names Woglinde, Wellgunde and Floßhilde. In his analysis of The Ring Deryck Cooke suggests the Rhinemaidens' origin may be in the Nibelungenlied, where three water sprites tease the characters Hagen and Gunther. Wagner may also have been influenced by the Rhine-based German legend of Lorelei, who lures fishermen on to the rocks by her singing, and by the Greek Hesperides myth in which three maidens guard a golden treasure.

Robert Jacobs, in his biography of the composer, observes that the "Nibelung Myth" on which Wagner based his entire Ring story was "very much a personal creation", the result of Wagner's "brilliant manipulation" of his sources. In the Rheingold text, Wagner used his imaginative powers to adapt, change and distort the stories and characters from the sagas. J.K. Holman, in his "Listener's Guide and Concordance" (2001), cites the Alberich character as typifying Wagner's ability to "consolidate selected aspects from diverse stories to create ... vivid, consistent and psychologically compelling portrait[s]". While some characters' importance is enhanced in Wagner's version, others, such as Donner, Froh, and Freia, who are major figures in the sagas, are reduced by Wagner to roles of largely passive impotence.

Wagner originally conceived the first scene of Das Rheingold as a prologue to the three scenes that follow it. As such, the structure replicates that of Götterdämmerung, and also that of the full Ring cycle.

=== Composition ===
As early as 1840, in his novella "A Pilgrimage to Beethoven", Wagner had anticipated a form of lyric drama in which the standard operatic divisions would disappear. In early 1851 he published his book-length essay Opera and Drama, in which he expounded his emerging ideas around the concept of Gesamtkunstwerk – "total work of art". In the new kind of musical drama, he wrote, the traditional operatic norms of chorus, arias and vocal numbers would have no part. The vocal line would, in Gutman's words, "interpret the text emotionally through artificially calculated juxtapositions of rhythm, accent, pitch and key relationships". The orchestra, as well as providing the instrumental colour appropriate to each stage situation, would use a system of leitmotifs, each representing musically a person, an idea or a situation. Wagner termed these "motifs of reminiscence and presentiment", which carry intense emotional experience through music rather than words. According to Jacobs, they should "permeate the entire tissue of the music drama". The Rheingold score is structured around many such motifs; analysts have used different principles in determining the total number. Holman counts 42, while Roger Scruton, in his 2017 philosophical analysis of the Ring, numbers them at 53.

Apart from some early sketches in 1850, relating to Siegfried's Death, Wagner composed the Ring music in its proper sequence. Thus, Das Rheingold was his first attempt to adopt the principles set out in Opera and Drama. According to his memoirs, Wagner's first inspiration for the music came to him in a half-dream, on 4 September 1853, while he was in Spezia in Italy. He records a feeling of "sinking in swiftly flowing water. The rushing sound formed itself in my brain into a musical sound, the chord of E flat major, which continually re-echoed in broken forms ... I at once recognised that the orchestral overture to the Rheingold, which must long have lain latent within me, though it had been unable to find definite form, had at last been revealed to me". Some authorities (for example Millington et al., 1992) have disputed the validity of this tale, which Nikolaus Bacht refers to as an "acoustic hallucination".

After an extended tour, Wagner was back in Zürich by late October and began writing down the Rheingold music on 1 November. He finished the first draft in mid-January 1854, and by the end of May had completed the full orchestral score. According to Holman, the result was "a stunning break from Wagner's earlier musical output" In the three years following his completion of the Rheingold score, Wagner wrote the music for Die Walküre, and for the first two acts of Siegfried. At that point, in 1857, he set Siegfried aside in order to work on Tristan und Isolde, and did not return to the Ring project for 12 years.

== Performances ==
=== Premiere, Munich, 22 September 1869 ===
Long before Das Rheingold was ready for performance, Wagner conducted excerpts of the music from scenes 1, 2 and 4, at a concert in Vienna on 26 December 1862. The work remained unstaged, but by 1869 Wagner's principal financial sponsor, King Ludwig of Bavaria, was pressing for an early performance in Munich. Wagner wanted to wait until the cycle was completed, when he would stage the work himself; also, his return to Munich would likely have precipitated a scandal, in view of his, at the time, affair with the married Cosima von Bülow. (Note: Wagner and Cosima were not married until 25 August 1870, although they were cohabiting in Switzerland.) Wagner was horrified at the idea of his work being presented in accordance with Ludwig's eccentric tastes. However, Ludwig, who possessed the copyright, was insistent that Rheingold be produced at the Munich Hofoper without further delay. Wagner did all he could to sabotage this production, fixed for August 1869, and persuaded the appointed conductor, Hans Richter to stand down after a troublesome dress rehearsal. Ludwig was unmoved; he denounced Wagner, sacked Richter, appointed another conductor, Franz Wüllner, and rescheduled the premiere for 22 September. Wagner was refused admission to the rehearsals at the theatre, and returned, angry and defeated, to his home in Tribschen.

Accounts differ as to the success or otherwise of the Munich premiere. Osborne maintains that the performance was successful, as does Holman, (Note: Holman wrongly dates the Rheingold Munich premiere to June 1870.) while Oliver Hilmes in his biography of Cosima describes it as "an artistic disaster". Cosima's diary entries for 24 and 27 September note that the performance was portrayed in the Munich press as a succès d'estime, or otherwise as "a lavishly decorated, boring work". Gutman maintains that much of the adverse comment on the Munich premiere derives from later Bayreuth propaganda, and concludes that, "in many ways, these Munich performances surpassed the level of the first Bayreuth festival". As to the public's reaction, the audience's main interest was in the novel scenery and stage effects; Wagner's new approach to composition largely passed them by.

=== Bayreuth premiere, 13 August 1876 ===
In 1876, with the Bayreuth Festspielhaus built, Wagner was ready to stage the first Bayreuth Festival with his own production of the now complete Ring cycle, beginning with a performance of Das Rheingold on 13 August. This event was preceded by months of preparation in which Wagner was deeply engaged; according to witnesses, he was "director, producer, coach, conductor, singer, actor, stage manager, stage hand and prompter". He searched Europe for the finest orchestral players, and selected a largely new cast of singers (Note: Franz Betz, who sang Wotan, and Max Schlosser (Mime) had appeared in the premiere of Die Meistersinger von Nürnberg in 1868.) – of the Munich cast, only Heinrich Vogl (Loge) was engaged, although Richter, deposed as conductor in Munich, was given the baton in Bayreuth.

The 13 August premiere was an event of international importance, and attracted a distinguished audience which included Kaiser Wilhelm I, Emperor Pedro II of Brazil and numerous representatives of the various European royal houses. King Ludwig, unwilling to face contact with his fellow-royals or the assembled crowd, attended the dress rehearsals incognito, but left Bayreuth before the opening night. (Note: Ludwig was so impressed by his preview that he arranged with Wagner to attend the third and final cycle of the festival. At the end, Wagner acknowledged Ludwig as the "sole benefactor and co-creator" of the work.) Most of Europe's leading composers were also present, including Tchaikovsky, Gounod, Bruckner, Grieg, Saint-Saëns and Wagner's father-in law Franz Liszt, together with a large corps of music critics and opera house managers. The huge influx of visitors overwhelmed the resources of the modest-sized town and caused considerable discomfort to some of the most distinguished of the guests; Tchaikovsky later described his sojourn at Bayreuth as a "struggle for existence". (Note: Tchaikovsky described the Ring music to his brother as "unbelievable chaos through which there flash from time to time remarkably beautiful and striking details". His overall view was that "there surely was not anything more boring or long winded as this interminable thing".)

Despite the careful preparation, the first Bayreuth performance of Das Rheingold was punctuated by several mishaps. Some scene changes were mishandled; at one point a backdrop was prematurely lifted to reveal a number of stagehands and stage machinery; early in scene 4, Franz Betz (as Wotan) mislaid the ring and had to go backstage to look for it; the gas lighting failed repeatedly, plunging the auditorium into darkness. Some innovations worked well – the wheeled machinery used by the Rhinemaidens to simulate swimming was successful, and the quality of the singing pleased even Wagner, who was otherwise in despair and refused to present himself to the audience despite their clamouring for him. The critics made much of the technical shortcomings, which were largely overcome during the course of the festival, although, to Wagner's fury, they failed to acknowledge this fact.

=== Revivals ===
==== Traditional productions ====
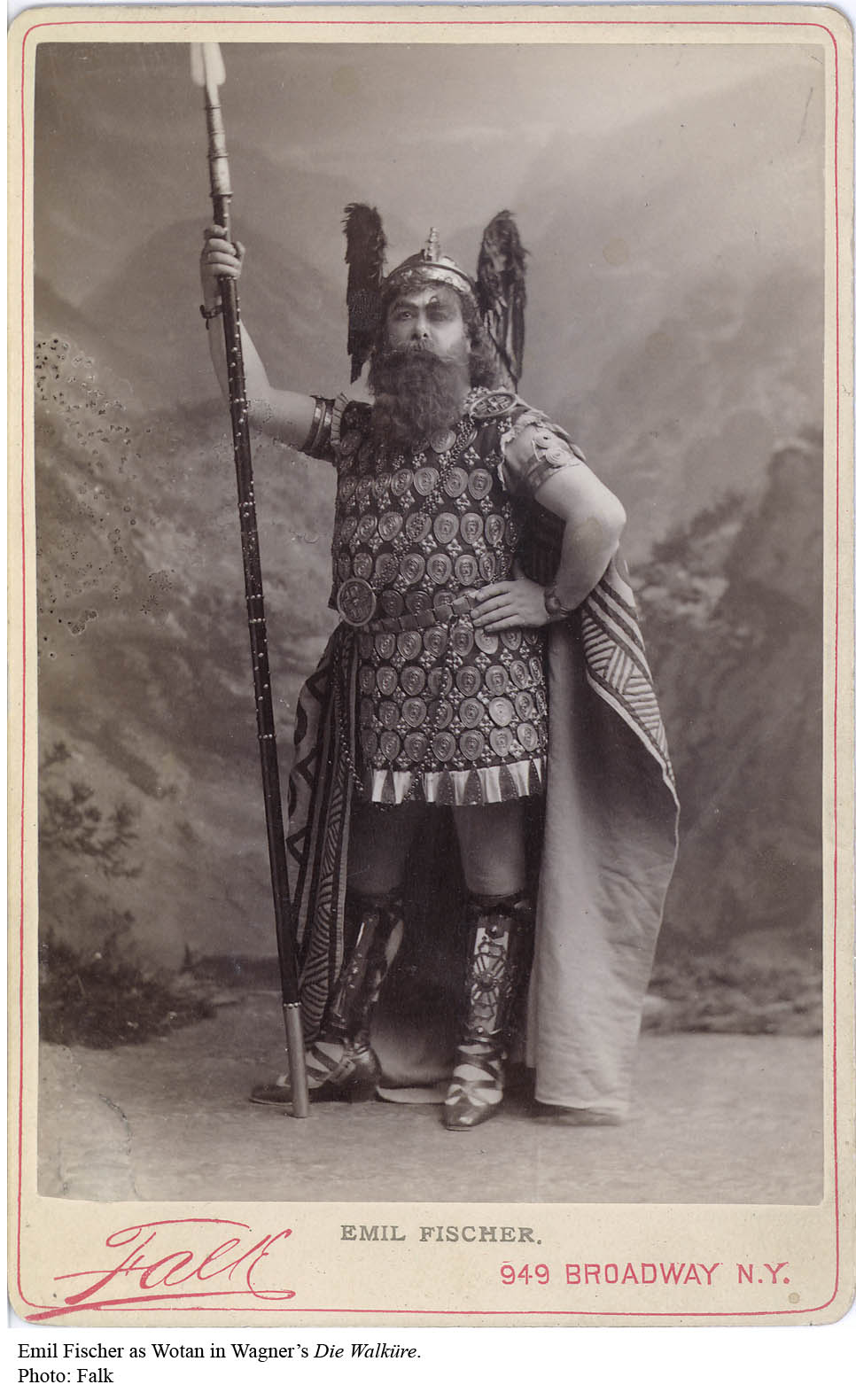
Emil Fischer as Wotan at the 1889 New York premiere

After the 1876 festival, Das Rheingold was not seen again at Bayreuth for 20 years, until Cosima revived the Ring cycle for the 1896 festival. Meanwhile, opera houses across Europe sought to mount their own productions, the first to do so being the Vienna State Opera, which staged Das Rheingold on 24 January 1878. In April 1878 Das Rheingold was produced in Leipzig, as part of the first full Ring cycle to be staged outside Bayreuth. London followed suit in May 1882, when Rheingold began a cycle at Her Majesty's Theatre, Haymarket, under the baton of Anton Seidl. In the years following the London premiere, Ring cycles were staged in many European capitals. In Budapest on 26 January 1889, the first Hungarian performance of Das Rheingold, conducted by the young Gustav Mahler, was briefly interrupted when the prompt-box caught fire and a number of patrons fled the theatre.

The American premiere of Das Rheingold was given by the New York Metropolitan Opera in January 1889, as a single opera, with Seidl conducting. The production used Carl Emil Doepler's original Bayreuth costume designs, and scenery was imported from Germany. According to The New York Times, "[t]he scenery, costumes and effects were all designed and executed with great art and caused admirable results." Of particular note was the performance of Joseph Beck who sang Alberich: "a fine example of Wagnerian declamatory singing, His delivery of the famous curse of the ring was notably excellent in its distinctness and dramatic force". On 4 March 1889, with largely the January cast, Seidl conducted Das Rheingold to begin the first American Ring cycle. Thereafter, Das Rheingold, either alone or as part of the Ring, became a regular feature of the international opera repertory, being seen in Saint Petersburg (1889), Paris (1901), Buenos Aires (1910), Melbourne (1913), (Note: In Melbourne, the British impresario Thomas Quinlan staged all four Ring operas, although not on consecutive evenings; he interspersed them with performances of operas by Verdi, Offenbach, Gounod and others. The complete Ring cycle as an entity was not staged in Australia until 1998.), and Rio de Janeiro (1921), as well many other major venues.

After the 1896 revival, Das Rheingold was being performed regularly at the Bayreuth Festival, although not every year, within a variety of Ring productions. Until the Second World War, under the successive artistic control of Cosima (from 1896 to 1907), her son Siegfried (1908 to 1930) and Siegfried's widow Winifred (1931 to 1943), these productions did not deviate greatly from the stagings devised by Wagner for the 1876 premiere. With few exceptions, this generally conservative, even reverential approach – which extended to all Wagner's operas – tended to be mirrored in performances outside Bayreuth.

==== New Bayreuth and experimentation ====
The Bayreuth Festival, suspended after the Second World War, resumed in 1951 under Wieland Wagner, Siegfried's son, who introduced his first Ring cycle in the "New Bayreuth" style. This was the antithesis of all that had been seen at Bayreuth before, as scenery, costumes and traditional gestures were abandoned and replaced by a bare disc, with evocative lighting effects to signify changes of scene or mood. The stark New Bayreuth style dominated most Rheingold and Ring productions worldwide until the 1970s, when a reaction to its bleak austerity produced a number of fresh approaches. The Bayreuth centenary Ring production of 1976, directed by Patrice Chéreau provided a significant landmark in the history of Wagner stagings: "Chéreau's demythologization of the tetralogy entailed an anti-heroic view of the work ... his setting of the action in an industrialized society ... along with occasional 20th century costumes and props, suggested a continuity between Wagner's time and our own". Many of this production's features were highly controversial: the opening of Das Rheingold revealed a vast hydro-electric dam in which the gold is stored, guarded by the Rhinemaidens who were portrayed, in Spotts's words, as "three voluptuous tarts" – a depiction, he says, which "caused a shock from which no one quite recovered". According to The Observer's critic, "I had not experienced in the theatre protest as furious as that which greeted Das Rheingold." Eventually this hostility was overcome; the final performance of this production, in 1980, was followed by an ovation that lasted ninety minutes.

==== Post-1980s ====
The iconoclastic centenary Ring was followed by numerous original interpretations, at Bayreuth and elsewhere, in the late 20th and early 21st centuries. The 1988 festival opened with Harry Kupfer's grim interpretation of Das Rheingold, in which Wotan and the other gods were represented as gangsters in mafioso sunglasses. This entire Ring, says Spotts, was "a parable of how the power-hungry cheat, lie, bully, terrorise and kill to get what they want". In August Everding's Chicago Reingold (which would become part of a full Ring cycle four years later), the Rhinemaidens were attached to elasticated ropes manipulated from the wings, which enabled them to cavort freely through the air, using lip sync to co-ordinate with off-stage singers. Edward Rothstein, writing in The New York Times, found the production "a puzzle ... cluttered with contraptions and conceits" which, he imagined, were visual motifs which would be clarified in later operas. Keith Warner, in his 2004 production for Covent Garden, portrayed, according to Barry Millington's analysis, "the shift from a deistic universe to one controlled by human beings". The dangers of subverted scientific progress were demonstrated in the third Rheingold scene, where Nibelheim was represented as a medical chamber of horrors, replete with vivisections and "unspeakable" genetic experiments.

From the late 1980s a backlash against the tendency towards ever more outlandish interpretations of the Ring cycle led to several new productions in the more traditional manner. Otto Schenk's staging of Das Rheingold, first seen at the New York Met in 1987 and forming the prelude to his full Ring cycle two years later, was described by The New York Times as "charmingly old fashioned", and as "a relief to many beleaguered Wagnerites". James Morris, who sang Wotan in the 1987 production, and James Levine, the original conductor, both returned in 2009 when Schenk brought his Ring cycle back to the Met for a final performance.

== Music ==
Das Rheingold was Wagner's first attempt to write dramatic music in accordance with the principles he had enunciated in Opera and Drama, hence the general absence in the score of conventional operatic "numbers" in the form of arias, ensembles and choruses. Rather than acting as the accompanist to the voices, the orchestra combines with them on equal terms to propel the drama forward. According to Barry Millington's analysis, Das Rheingold represents Wagner's purest application of the Opera and Drama principles, a rigorous stance that he would eventually modify. Even in Rheingold, as Jacobs indicates, Wagner was flexible when the dramatic occasion warranted it; thus, the Rhinemaidens sing in the disavowed ensembles, and there are several instances in which characters sing melodies that appear to be musically independent from the general flow. The music is continuous, with instrumental entr'actes linking the actions of the four discrete scenes.

=== Prelude ===
The prelude to Das Rheingold consists of an extended (136-bar) chord in E♭ major, which begins almost inaudibly in the lowest register of eight double-basses. The note of B♭ is added by the bassoons and the chord is further embellished as the horns enter with a rising arpeggio to announce the "Nature" motif, outlining the lower partials of an harmonic series with an E♭ fundamental. This is further elaborated in the strings; the lower-register instruments sustain the E♭ note throughout the prelude, while the chord is increasingly enhanced by the orchestra. The "Rhine" motif emerges, representing what Osborne describes as "the calm, majestic course of the river's character The composer Robert Erickson describes the prelude as drone music – "the only well-known drone piece in the concert repertory". Millington suggests that the protracted chord does not simply represent the depths of the Rhine, rather "the birth of the world, the act of creation itself".

=== First scene ===
When the prelude reaches its climax the curtain rises and the key shifts to A♭ as Woglinde sings a "greeting to the waters". The first two and last two notes of this short, lilting passage form a falling musical step which, in different guises, will recur throughout the opera, signifying variously the Rhinemaidens' innocence, their joy in the gold and conversely, in the minor key, Alberich's woe at his rejection by the maidens, and his enslavement of the Nibelungs. The first appearance of the gold is signified by a muted horn call in the lower register, played under a shimmer of undulating strings, conveying, says Holman, "the shining, innocent beauty of the Rhinegold in its unfashioned state." The motif for the ring itself first appears in the woodwind, as Wellgunde reveals that a ring fashioned from the gold would confer on its owner the power to win the wealth of the world. This is followed by what is sometimes known as the "renunciation" motif, when Woglinde sings that to fashion such a ring, the owner must first renounce love. Confusion arises because this same motif is used later in the Ring cycle to represent affirmation rather than rejection of love; Roger Scruton suggests the motif would be more appropriately labelled "existential choice". Alberich duly curses love, seizes the gold and departs, to the sounds of the despairing shrieks of the Rhinemaidens.

=== Second scene ===
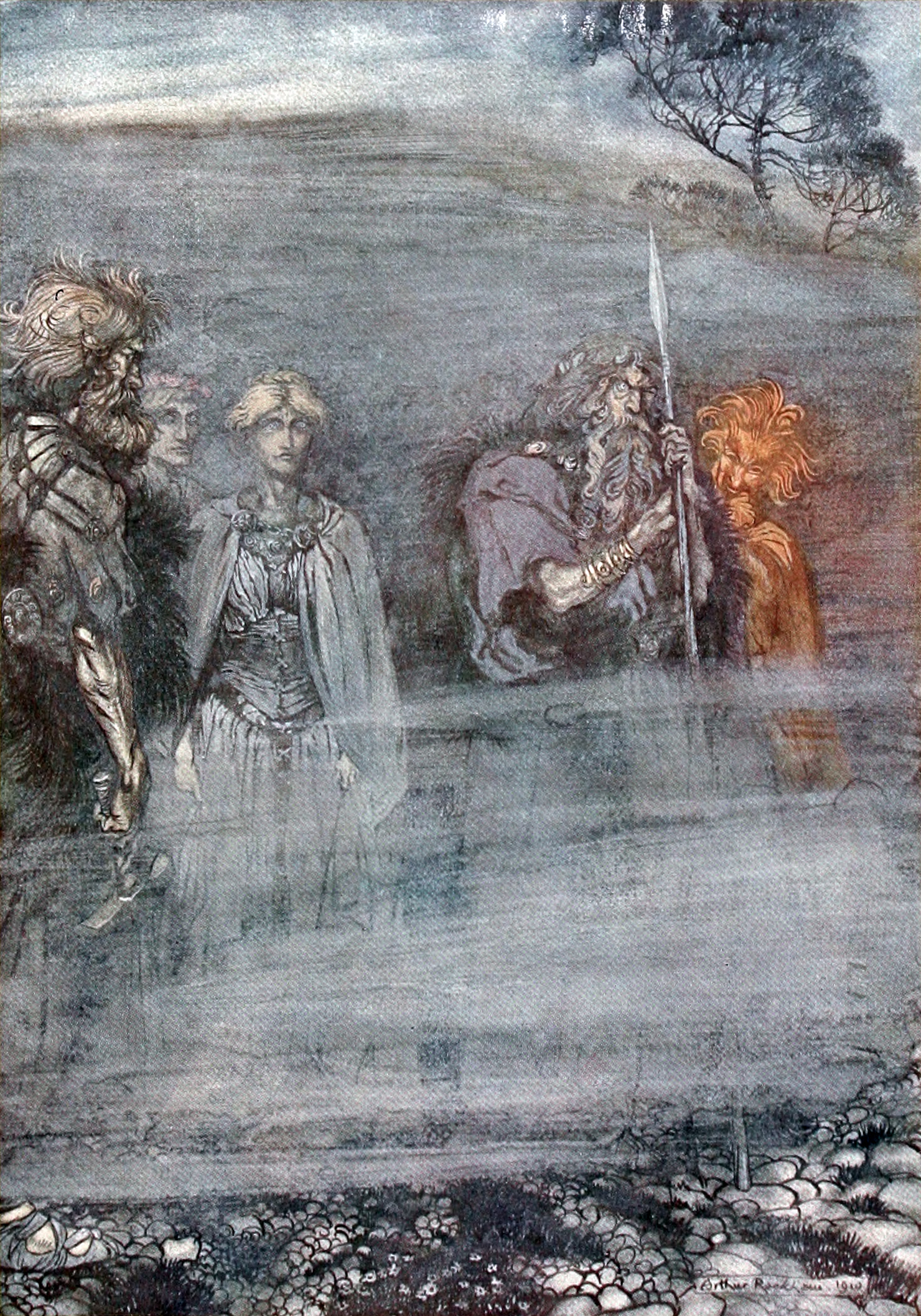
The gods begin to lose their youth on Freia's departure

During the first entr'acte, the Ring motif is transformed into the multipart and oft-reiterated "Valhalla" music – four intertwined motifs which represent the majesty of the gods and the extent of Wotan's power. Scene two begins on the mountaintop, in sight of the newly completed castle, where Fricka and Wotan bicker over Wotan's contract with the giants. This duologue is characterised by Fricka's "Love's longing" motif, in which she sighs for a home that will satisfy Wotan and halt his infidelities. Freia's distressed entrance is illustrated by "Love", a fragment that will recur and develop as the Ring cycle unfolds. The Giants' entrance is signified by heavy, stamping music that reflects both their simple nature and their brute strength. The "Golden Apples" motif, of "remarkable beauty" according to Scruton, is sung by Fafner as a threatening reminder to the gods that the loss of Freia means the loss of their youth and vigour; it is later used by Loge to mock the gods for their weakness after Freia's departure with the giants. The "Spear" motif, a rapidly descending scale, represents the moral basis of Wotan's power and the sanctity of the treaties engraved on it. The phrase of five descending notes known as "Woman's Worth", first sung by Loge, is described by Holman as one of the most pervasive and appealing motifs in the entire Ring cycle – he lists 43 occurrences of the motif throughout the cycle. Many of the Ring's characters – Wotan, Froh, Alberich, Fasolt and Erda in Das Rheingold – either sing this phrase or are orchestrally referenced by it.

=== Third scene ===
The descent of Wotan and Loge into Nibelheim is represented musically in the second entr'acte, which begins with the "renunciation" and "spear" motifs but is quickly overwhelmed with the insistent, rhythmic 9/8 beat of the Nibelung motif in B♭, briefly foreshadowed in Loge's scene 2 soliloquy. In the climax to the entr'acte this rhythm is hammered out on eighteen anvils. This motif is thereafter used, not just to represent the Nibelungs but also their enslavement in a state of relentless misery. During the scene's opening interaction between Alberich and Mime, the soft, mysterious "Tarnhelm" motif is heard on muted horns; this is later combined with the "serpent" motif as, at Loge's behest, Alberich uses the Tarnhelm to transform himself into a giant snake. The transition back to the mountaintop, following Alberich's entrapment, references a number of motifs, among them Alberich's woe, the ring, renunciation and the Nibelungs' enslavement.

=== Fourth scene ===
After Wotan seizes the ring from the captive Alberich, the dwarf's agonised, self-pitying monologue ("Am I now free?") ends with his declamation of the "Curse" motif – "one of the most sinister musical ideas ever to have entered the operatic repertoire", according to Scruton's analysis: "It rises through a half-diminished chord, and then falls through an octave to settle on a murky C major triad, with clarinets in their lowest register over a timpani pedal in F sharp". This motif will recur throughout the cycle; it will be heard later in this scene, when Fafner clubs Fasolt to death over possession of the ring. Tranquil, ascending harmonies introduce the reconvention of the gods and giants. The subsequent dispute over Wotan's reluctance to part with the ring ends with Erda's appearance; her motif is a minor-key variation of the "Nature" motif from the prelude. After her warning she departs to the sounds of the "Downfall" motif, an inversion of Erda's entry that resembles "Woman's Worth". The scene ends with a rapid succession of motifs: "Donner's Call", a horn fanfare by which he summons the thunderstorm; Froh's "Rainbow Bridge" which provides a path for the gods into Valhalla; the "Sword" motif, a C major arpeggio that will become highly significant in later Ring operas, and the haunting "Rhinemaidens' Lament", developed from the falling step which earlier signified the maidens' joy in the gold. Scruton writes of this lament: "And yet, ever sounding in the depths, is the lament of the Rhine-daughters, singing of a natural order that preceded the conscious will that has usurped it. This lament sounds in the unconsciousness of us all, as we pursue our paths to personality, sovereignty and freedom...". (Note: Cosima Wagner's diary entry for 12 February 1883 records that, on the night before he died, Wagner played the Rhinemaidens' lament on the piano, telling her: "I feel loving towards them, these subservient creatures of the deep, with all their yearning".) These are the last voices that are heard in the opera, "piercing our hearts with sudden longing, melting our bones with nostalgic desire", before the gods, "marching in empty triumph to their doom", enter Valhalla to a thunderous orchestral conclusion, made up from several motifs including "Valhalla", "Rainbow Bridge" and the "Sword".

=== Orchestral forces ===
Das Rheingold is scored for the following instrumental forces:

- Woodwind: Piccolo; 3 flutes; 3 oboes; cor anglais; 3 clarinets; bass clarinet; 3 bassoons
- Brass: 8 horns (5-8 doubling Wagner Tubas in Bb and F); 3 trumpets; bass trumpet; 2 tenor trombones; bass trombone; contrabass trombone (doubling bass trombone); contrabass tuba
- Percussion: 2 sets of timpani; cymbals; triangle; tam-tam
- Strings: 16 first violins; 16 second violins; 12 violas; 12 cellos; 8 double basses; 6 harps (plus a seventh off-stage)
- Off-stage: 18 anvils of varying sizes (tuned to 3 octaves of F); hammer; thunder machine

== Critical assessment ==
Although it is sometimes performed independently, Das Rheingold is not generally considered outside the structure of the Ring cycle. However, as Millington points out, it is a substantial work in its own right, and has several characteristics not shared by the other works in the tetralogy. It is comparatively short, with continuous music; no interludes or breaks. The action moves forward relatively swiftly, unencumbered, as Arnold Whittall observed, by the "retarding explanations" – pauses in the action to clarify the context of what is going on – that permeate the later, much longer works. Its lack of the conventional operatic devices (arias, choruses, ensembles) further enable the story to progress briskly.

Since it was written as a prelude to the main events, Das Rheingold is in itself inconclusive, leaving numerous loose ends to be picked up later; its function, as Jacobs says, is "to expound, not to draw conclusions". The fact that most of its characters display decidedly human emotions makes it seem, according to a recent writer, "much more a present-day drama than a remote fable". Nevertheless, Philip Kennicott, writing in The Washington Post describes it as "the hardest of the four installments to love, with its family squabbles, extensive exposition, and the odd, hybrid world Wagner creates, not always comfortably balanced between the mythic and the recognizably human." Certain presumptions are challenged or overturned; John Louis Gaetani, in a 2006 essay, notes that, in Loge's view, the gods are far more culpable than the Nibelungs, and that Wotan, for all his prestige as the ruler of the gods, "does much more evil than Alberich ever dreams of".

== Recording ==
Live performances of Das Rheingold from Bayreuth and elsewhere were recorded from 1937 onwards, but were not issued for many years. The first studio recording, and the first to be issued commercially, was Georg Solti's 1958 Decca version, part of his complete Ring cycle, 1958–1966, which marked the beginning of a new era in recorded opera. Since then Das Rheingold has been recorded, as part of the cycle, on many occasions, with regular new issues.

== Notes and references ==
=== Sources ===
- Bacht, Nikolaus (2006). Music, Theatre and Politics in Germany: 1848 to the Third Reich. Aldershot: Ashgate Publishing Ltd. ISBN 978-0-75465-521-3.
- Bailey, Robert (July 1977). "The Structure of the "Ring" and Its Evolution". 19th-Century Music. 1 (1): 48–61. doi:10.2307/746769. JSTOR 746769.
- Carr, Jonathan (1997). Mahler: a Biography. London and New York: The Overlook Press. ISBN 978-0-87951-802-8.
- Cooke, Deryck (1979). I Saw The World End. Oxford: Oxford University Press. ISBN 978-0-19-315318-9.
- DiGaetani, John Louis (2006). "Introduction: The Cycles in the Cycle". In John Louis DiGaetani (ed.). Inside the Ring: Essays on Wagner's Opera Cycle. Jefferson, North Carolina: McFarland. ISBN 978-0-78642-330-9.
- Donington, Robert (1963). Wagner's 'Ring' and its Symbols. London: Faber and Faber. OCLC 721210320.
- Erickson, Robert (1975). Sound Structure in Music. Berkeley: University of California Press. ISBN 978-0-52002-376-5.
- Grey, Thomas S. (2017). "Music as Natural Language in the Moral Order of Wagner's Ring". In Samson, Jim; Zon, Bennett (eds.). Nineteenth-Century Music: Selected Proceedings of the Tenth International Conference. London and New York: Routledge. ISBN 9-781-35155-630-9.
- Gutman, Robert W. (1971). Richard Wagner: The man, his mind and his music. Harmondsworth: Penguin Books. ISBN 9-780-14021-168-9.
- Heldt, Brigitte. "Wagner's Ring: Premiere in Munich". In DiGaetani (2006).
- Hilmes, Oliver (2011). Cosima Wagner: The Lady of Bayreuth. New Haven and London: Yale University Press. ISBN 978-0-300-17090-0.
- Holman, J. K. (2001). Wagner's Ring: A Listener's Companion & Concordance. Portland, OR: Amadeus Press. ISBN 978-1-57467-070-7.
- Jacobs, Robert L. (1980). Wagner (The Master Musicians Series). London: J. M. Dent & Sons. ISBN 978-0-460-03153-0. (First published 1935, revised 1965, 1974 and 1980)
- Kennedy, Michael; Rutherford-Johnson, Tim; Kennedy, Joyce (2013). The Oxford Dictionary of Music. Oxford: Oxford University Press. ISBN 978-0-19957-854-2.
- Knapp, J. Merrill (Summer 1977). "The Instrumentation Draft of Wagner's Das Rheingold". Journal of the American Musicological Society. 30 (2). University of California Press: 272–295. doi:10.2307/831220. JSTOR 831220.
- Mann, William (1964). Das Rheingold: English Translation/Introduction/Synopsis. London: Friends of Covent Garden. OCLC 504231637.
- Millington, Barry (1992). "The Music: Operas". In Barry Millington (ed.). The Wagner Compendium. London: Thames & Hudson. ISBN 978-0-50028-274-8.
- Millington, Barry; Deathridge, John; Bailey, Robert; Forbes, Elizabeth; Pachl, Peter P.; Sheren, Paul (2002). "(Wilhelm) Richard Wagner". Oxford Music Online. doi:10.1093/gmo/9781561592630.article.O905605. ISBN 978-1-56159-263-0. (subscription required)
- Millington, Barry (2006). The New Grove Guide to Wagner and his Operas. Oxford: Oxford University Press. ISBN 978-0-19-530588-3.
- Newman, Ernest (1949). Wagner Nights. London: Putnam. OCLC 3974782.
- Osborne, Charles (1992). The Complete Operas of Richard Wagner: A Critical Guide. London: Victor Gollancz. ISBN 978-0-575-05380-9.
- Sabor, Rudolph (1989). The Real Wagner. London: Andre Deutsch. ISBN 978-0-74740-178-0.
- Scruton, Roger (2017). The Ring of Truth: The Wisdom of Wagner's Ring of the Nibelung. London: Penguin Books. ISBN 978-0-141-98072-0.
- Skelton, Geoffrey (1994). Cosima Wagner's Diaries: an Abridgement. London: Pimlico Books. ISBN 978-0-71265-952-9.
- Spotts, Frederic (1994). Bayreuth: A History of the Wagner Festival. New Haven and London: Yale University Press. ISBN 978-0-300-05777-5.
- Steen, Michael (2009). The Lives and Times of the Great Composers. London: Icon Books. ISBN 978-1-84046-679-9.
- Vernon, David (2021). Disturbing the Universe: Wagner's Musikdrama. Edinburgh: Candle Row Press. ISBN 978-1527299245.
- Wagner, Richard (1895). "A Communication to My Friends" (PDF). Translated by Ellis, William Ashton. The Wagner Library. Archived (PDF) from the original on 12 October 2012.
- Wagner, Richard; Gray, Andrew (tr.) (1983). Whittall, Mary (ed.). Richard Wagner: My Life. Cambridge: Cambridge University Press. ISBN 978-0-52122-929-6.
- Whittall, Arnold (October 1983). "Wagner's Great Transition? From Lohengrin to Das Rheingold". Music Analysis. 2 (3): 269–280. doi:10.2307/854158. JSTOR 854158. (subscription required)
- Whittall, Arnold (1992). "Musical language". In Barry Millington (ed.). The Wagner Compendium. London: Thames & Hudson. ISBN 978-0-50028-274-8.
