= Siegfried (opera) =

1876 opera by Richard Wagner

- Music drama by Richard Wagner
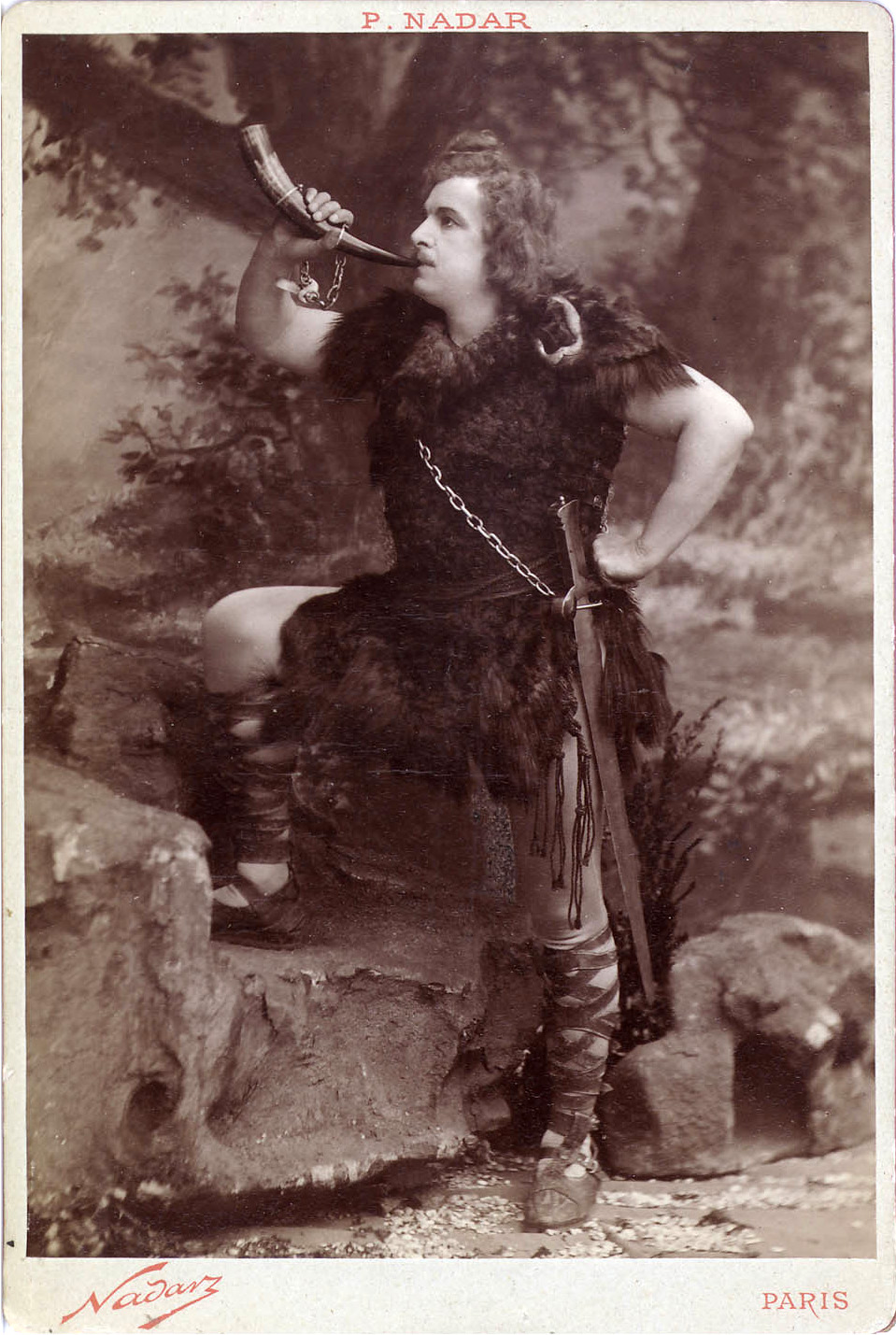
- Jean de Reszke as Siegfried (c. 1896)
- Librettist: Richard Wagner
- Language: German
- Based on: Nordic and German legends
- Premiere: 16 August 1876; Bayreuth Festspielhaus

Siegfried (German: [ˈziːk.fʀiːt]), WWV 86C, is the third of the four epic music dramas that constitute Richard Wagner's cycle Der Ring des Nibelungen (English: The Ring of the Nibelung). It premiered at the Bayreuth Festspielhaus on 16 August 1876, as part of the first complete performance of The Ring cycle.

The autograph manuscript of the work is preserved in the Richard Wagner Foundation.

== Background and context ==
Structure of the Ring cycle

1. Das Rheingold
2. Die Walküre
3. Siegfried
4. Götterdämmerung

The libretto of Siegfried was drafted by Wagner in November–December 1852, based on an earlier version he had prepared in May–June 1851 and originally entitled Jung-Siegfried (Young Siegfried), later changed to Der junge Siegfried. The musical composition was commenced in 1856, but not finally completed until 1871.

The libretto arose from Wagner's gradual reconception of the project he had initiated with his libretto Siegfrieds Tod (Siegfried's Death) which was eventually to be incarnated as Götterdämmerung, the final section of the Ring cycle. Having sketched music and worked with the text for Siegfrieds Tod in 1851, he realized that it would need a 'preface'. At this point he conceived that the prefatory opera, Der junge Siegfried, could act as a comic foil to the tragedy of Siegfrieds Tod. Preliminary musical sketches for Der junge Siegfried in 1851 were however quickly abandoned, although Wagner had written to his friend Theodor Uhlig that "the musical phrases are making themselves for these stanzas and periods, without my even having to take pains for them. It's all growing out of the ground as if it were wild." Shortly afterwards he wrote to Uhlig that he was now planning to tell the Siegfried story in the form of "three dramas, plus a prologue in three acts"—a clear prefiguring of the Ring cycle.

Full work was finally commenced on the music of Siegfried, as the composer henceforth referred to it, in 1856, when Wagner prepared concurrently two drafts, a complete draft in pencil and a version in ink on up to three staves in which he worked out details of instrumentation and vocal line. The composition of Acts I and II was completed by August 1857. Wagner then left off work on Siegfried to write the operas Tristan und Isolde and Die Meistersinger. He did not resume work on Siegfried until 1869, when he composed the third act. The final revision of the score was undertaken in February 1871. Performance was withheld until the first complete production of the Ring cycle, at Bayreuth in August 1876.

== Roles ==
Role	Voice type	Premiere cast, 16 August 1876 (Conductor: Hans Richter)
Siegfried	tenor	Georg Unger
Mime	tenor	Max Schlosser
Wotan (disguised as The Wanderer)	bass-baritone	Franz Betz
Alberich	baritone	Karl Hill
Fafner	bass	Franz von Reichenberg
Waldvogel (the woodbird)	coloratura soprano	Marie Haupt
Erda	contralto	Luise Jaide
Brünnhilde	high dramatic soprano	Amalie Materna

== Instrumentation ==
Siegfried is scored for the following instrumental forces:

- Woodwinds: 3 flutes (3rd doubling piccolo), 3 oboes, English horn, 3 clarinets, bass clarinet, 3 bassoons, contrabassoon
- Brass: 8 horns (4 doubling Wagner tubas), 3 trumpets, bass trumpet, 3 trombones, contrabass trombone, contrabass tuba
- Percussion: Timpani, snare drum, cymbals, triangle, glockenspiel, and an onstage tuned anvil used during the sword-forging scene
- Strings: 6 harps, 16 first violins; 16 second violins; 12 violas; 12 cellos; 8 double basses

== Synopsis ==
=== Act 1 ===
Prelude to Act 1

Scene 1

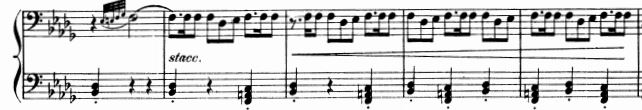
Leitmotif for the Nibelungs

A cave in rocks in the forest. An orchestral introduction includes references to leitmotifs including themes relating to the original hoard plundered by the Nibelung Alberich, and one in B-flat minor associated with the Nibelungs themselves. As the curtain rises, Alberich's brother, the dwarf Mime, is forging a sword ("Zwangvolle Plage!"). Mime is plotting to obtain the ring of power originally created by his brother Alberich. He has raised the human boy Siegfried as a foster child, to kill Fafner, who obtained the ring and other treasures in the opera Das Rheingold and has since transformed himself from a giant to a dragon. Mime needs a sword for Siegfried to use, but the youth has contemptuously broken every sword Mime has made. Siegfried returns from his wanderings in the forest driving before him a large bear that terrifies Mime, and immediately breaks the new sword. After a whining speech by Mime about ingratitude, and how Mime has brought him up from a mewling infant ("Als zullendes Kind"), Siegfried senses why he keeps coming back to Mime although he despises him: he wants to know his parentage. Mime is forced to explain that he encountered Siegfried's mother, Sieglinde, when she was in labor; she died giving birth to Siegfried. He shows Siegfried the broken pieces of the sword Nothung, which she had left in his custody. Siegfried orders him to reforge the sword; however, Mime is unable to accomplish this. Siegfried departs, leaving Mime in despair ("Aus dem Wald fort in die Welt zieh’n").

Scene 2

An old man (Wotan in disguise) arrives at the door and introduces himself as the Wanderer ("Heil dir, weiser Schmied!"). In return for the hospitality due a guest, he wagers his head on answering any three questions Mime may ask. The dwarf asks the Wanderer to name the races that live beneath the ground, on the earth, and in the skies. These are the Nibelungs, the Giants, and the Gods, as the Wanderer answers correctly. When Mime still refuses hospitality, the Wanderer demands that Mime answer his three questions, or yield his own head. The Wanderer asks Mime to identify: the race most beloved of Wotan, but most harshly treated; the name of the sword that can destroy Fafner; and the person who can repair the sword. Mime can answer only the first two questions: the Wälsungs (Siegmund and Sieglinde whose tale is told in the opera Die Walküre) and the sword Nothung. Wotan tells him that only "he who does not know fear" can reforge Nothung, and abstains from taking Mime's head, leaving it for that person.

Scene 3

Mime despairs as he imagines the ferocity of the dragon Fafner, while "the orchestra paints a dazzling picture of flickering lights and roaring flames" ("Verfluchtes Licht!"). Siegfried returns and is annoyed by Mime's lack of progress. Mime realizes that Siegfried is "the one who does not know fear" and that unless he can instill fear in him, Siegfried will kill him as the Wanderer foretold. He tells Siegfried that fear is an essential craft; Siegfried is eager to learn it, and Mime promises to teach him by taking him to Fafner ("Fühltest du nie im finst’ren Wald"). Since Mime was unable to forge Nothung, Siegfried decides to do it himself ("Nothung! Nothung! Neidliches Schwert!"). He succeeds by shredding the metal, melting it, and casting it anew. In the meantime, Mime brews a poisoned drink to offer Siegfried after the youth has defeated the dragon. After he finishes forging the sword, Siegfried demonstrates its strength by chopping the anvil in half with it ("Hoho! Hoho! Hohei! Schmiede, mein Hammer, ein hartes Schwert!" - Siegfrieds Schmiedelied - Siegfried's Forging Song).

=== Act 2 ===
Prelude to Act 2 - Fafners Ruhe (Fafner's Rest)

Scene 1

Deep in the forest. The Wanderer arrives at the entrance to Fafner's cave, near which Alberich secretly keeps vigil by a rocky cliff ("Im Wald und Nacht"). The two enemies recognize each other. Alberich boasts of his plans to regain the ring and rule the world. Wotan states that he does not intend to interfere, only to observe. He even offers to awaken the dragon so that Alberich can bargain with him. Alberich warns the dragon that a hero is coming to kill him, and offers to prevent the fight in exchange for the ring. Fafner dismisses the threat, declines Alberich's offer, and returns to sleep. Wotan mysteriously advises Alberich that all things follow their own necessary ways which no one will change. He then rides away on his horse, leaving Alberich alone. Alberich withdraws and hides himself again in the rocks.

Orchestral Interlude

Scene 2

Horncall from Act II of 'Siegfried' (Siegfried's leitmotif)

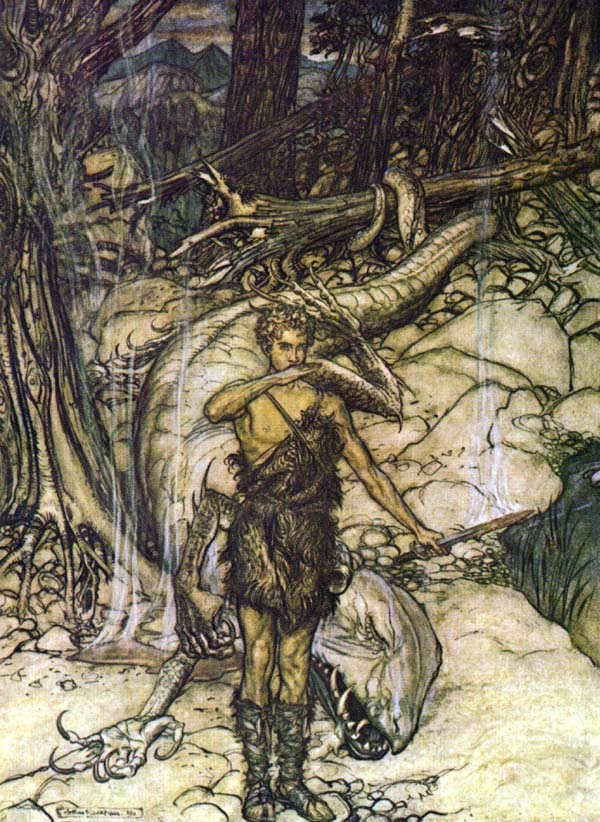
Siegfried tastes the dragon's blood (Rackham)

At daybreak, Siegfried and Mime arrive. After assuring Siegfried that the dragon will teach him what fear is, Mime withdraws. As Siegfried waits for the dragon to appear, he hears a woodbird singing from the trees (Waldweben - Forest Murmurs). He attempts to mimic the bird's song using a reed pipe, but is unsuccessful. He then plays a tune on his horn (Siegfrieds Hornruf - Siegfried's Horn Call), which unintentionally wakes Fafner in his cave. After a short exchange, they fight; Siegfried stabs Fafner in the heart with Nothung. Regretful about his own life Fafner in his last moments learns the boy's name and tells Siegfried to beware the might of the curse, which condemns every lord of the Ring to death, just as it has now brought death to him. When Siegfried withdraws his sword from Fafner's body, his hands are burned by the dragon's hot blood and he puts his finger in his mouth. On tasting the blood, he finds that he can understand the woodbird's song ("Hei! Siegfried gehört nun der Niblungen Hort!"). Following its instructions, he takes the ring and the magic helmet Tarnhelm from Fafner's hoard.

Scene 3

Outside the cave, Alberich and Mime meet and quarrel over the treasure ("Wohin schleichst du eilig und schlau"). Alberich hides as Siegfried comes out of the cave. Siegfried contemplates the ring but doesn't know what could be its use, viewing it just innocently as a valueless object of nature ("Was ihr mir nützt, weiß ich nicht"); nevertheless, on the forest bird's advice he decides to keep it. Then he complains to Mime that not even the dragon Fafner has taught him the meaning of fear. Mime congratulates him on having won his battle, and offers him the poisoned drink; however, the magic power of the dragon's blood allows Siegfried to read Mime's treacherous thoughts, and he stabs him to death ("Willkommen, Siegfried!"). Hidden nearby, Alberich is heard laughing spitefully at his brother's death. Siegfried puts Mime's body into the treasure cave and places Fafner's body in the cave entrance to block it. The woodbird now sings of a woman sleeping on a rock surrounded by magic fire ("Nun sing! Ich lausche dem Gesang"). Siegfried, wondering if he can learn fear from this woman, follows the bird towards the rock.

=== Act 3 ===
Prelude to Act 3

Scene 1

At the foot of Brünnhilde's rock. The Wanderer summons Erda, the earth goddess ("Wache, Wala!"). Erda, appearing confused, is unable to offer any advice ("Männerthaten umdämmern mir den Muth"). Wotan informs her that he no longer fears the end of the gods; indeed, he wills it, because he now recognizes that through his own demise the true heritage of his life will be left to the independent pair free from envy in their love, to Siegfried the Wälsung, who took Alberich's ring without succumbing to its corrupting influence thanks to his fearlessness, and Brünnhilde (Erda's and Wotan's child), who will work the deed that redeems the World ("Dir Unweisen ruf’ ich’s in’s Ohr"). Dismissed, Erda sinks back into the earth.

Scene 2

Siegfried arrives, and the Wanderer questions the youth ("Mein Vöglein schwebte mir fort"). Siegfried, who does not recognize his grandfather, answers insolently and starts down the path toward Brünnhilde's rock. The Wanderer blocks his path, but Siegfried mocks him, laughing at his floppy hat and his missing eye, and breaks his spear (the symbol and source of Wotan's authority and power) with a blow from Nothung. Wotan, accepting his fate, calmly gathers up the pieces and vanishes ("Zieh’ hin! Ich kann dich nicht halten!").

Orchestral Interlude

Scene 3

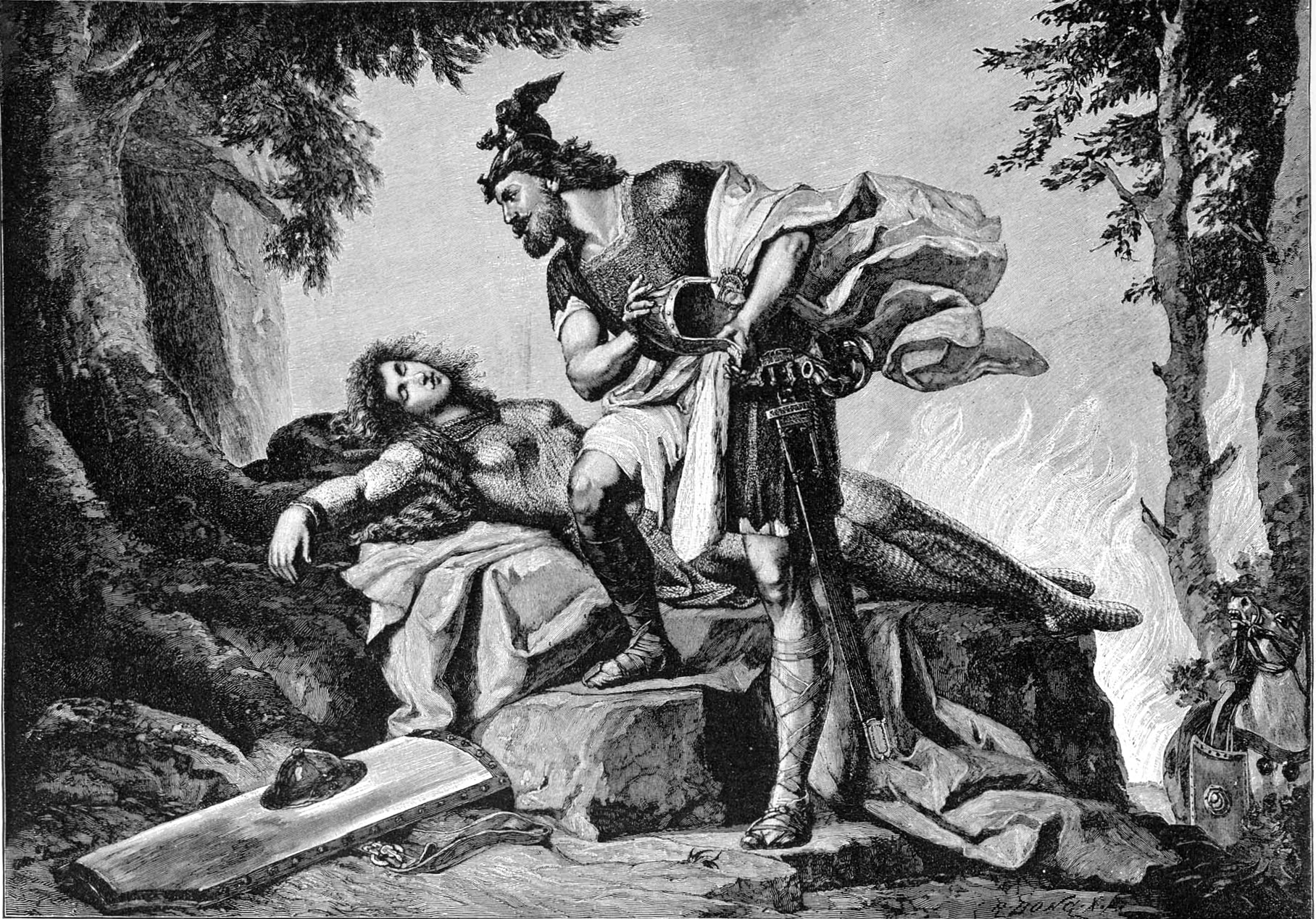
Siegfried awakens Brünnhilde - Otto von Richter, (1892)

Thanks to his fearlessness Siegfried passes through the ring of fire, emerging on Brünnhilde's rock ("Selige Öde auf sonniger Höh’!"). At first, he thinks the sleeping armored figure is a man. However, when he removes the armor, he finds a woman beneath. At the sight of the first woman he has ever seen and struck with the feeling of love, Siegfried at last experiences fear. In desperation, he kisses Brünnhilde, waking her from her magic sleep. Upon waking she hails the Sun and greets Siegfried as the World's Light ("Heil dir, Sonne! Heil dir, Licht!"). Afraid and hesitant at first to do so, Brünnhilde is eventually won over by Siegfried's love and renounces through her love for him the world of the gods and with it her own powers ("Ewig war ich, ewig bin ich"). Together, they solemnly sing praises to love, in comparison with which the glory of the gods itself seems dimmed and in which even dying can be jubilant: "radiant love, laughing death!" ("Leuchtende Liebe, lachender Tod!")

== Sources ==
Elements of the plot of Siegfried come from a variety of sources.

In a letter to Uhlig, Wagner recounted The Story of the Youth Who Went Forth to Learn What Fear Was, based on a fairy-tale of the Brothers Grimm. It concerns a boy so stupid he had never learned to be afraid. Wagner wrote that the boy and Siegfried are the same character. The boy is taught to fear by his wife, and Siegfried learns it when he discovers the sleeping Brünnhilde.

Siegfried's ability in Act Two to see through Mime's deceitful words seems to have been derived from a 19th-century street theatre version of the story of Faust.

Some elements of the story are derived from legends of Sigurd, notably the Völsunga saga and the Thidrekssaga. Scene 1 of Act III (between The Wanderer and Erda) has a parallel in the Eddic poem Baldrs draumar, in which Odin questions a völva about the future of the gods.
