= Anna Kaufmann =

German operatic soprano

Anna Kaufmann (born 1845 – died after 1870) was a German operatic soprano who was a principal artist at the Bavarian State Opera in Munich from 1869 to 1872. Just prior to her appointment, the great soprano Mathilde Mallinger had left the Bavarian State Opera and Kaufmann succeeded her in the roles of Elsa in Richard Wagner's Lohengrin, Elisabeth in Wagner's Tannhäuser, and Eva in Wagner's Die Meistersinger von Nürnberg among other parts. She notably created the roles of Woglinde in Wagner's Das Rheingold on September 22, 1869, and Fricka in Wagner's Die Walküre on June 26, 1869. Currently, no further biographical details about Kaufmann's life both before and after her time at the Bavarian State Opera have surfaced.
