= Nachbaur =

Nachbaur is a German surname. Notable people with the surname include:

- Don Nachbaur (born 1959), Canadian ice hockey player
- Franz Nachbaur (1835–1902), German opera singer
- Ryan Nachbaur (born 2004),

Agriculture specialist

== See also ==
- Ernst Stahl-Nachbaur (1886–1960), German actor
- 20288 Nachbaur, a main-belt asteroid
