= Max Schlosser =

Max Schlosser may refer to:

- Max Schlosser (zoologist)
- Max Schlosser (tenor)
