= Georg Unger =

German opera singer

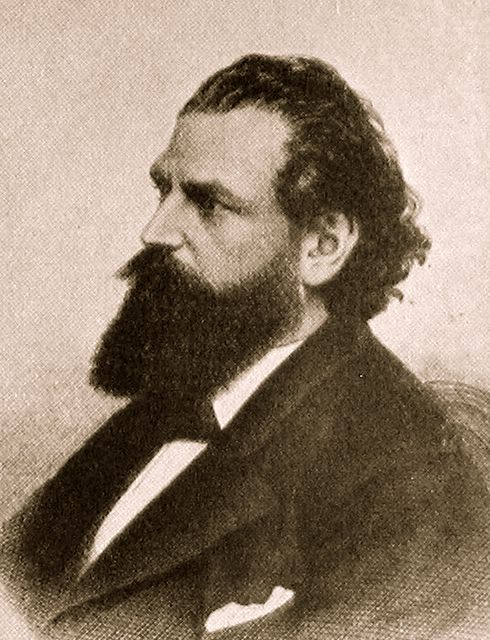
Georg Unger

Georg Unger (March 6, 1837 - February 2, 1887) was a German operatic tenor most famous for playing Siegfried in Der Ring des Nibelungen written by Richard Wagner.

Unger was born in Leipzig (Germany), and as a student studied Theology and music. He made his singing debut aged 37, going on to make appearances at Cassel, Zurich, Bremen, Neustrelitz, Brunn, Elberfeld and Mannheim.

He was recommended to Richard Wagner for the role of Siegfried by Hans Richter, and, after close supervision from a singing tutor, he performed the part in Siegfried and Götterdämmerung with great success at Bayreuth in 1876 and at other venues in the premiere of the complete cycle of Der Ring des Nibelungen, conducted by Richter. In the same cycle, Unger also played Froh in Das Rheingold.

He made regular appearances at Leipzig from 1877 to 1881. He was married to soprano Marie Haupt.
