= Kaspar Bausewein =

German opera singer

Kaspar Bausewein (15 November 1838, Aub – 18 November 1903, Munich) was a German operatic bass who was active at the Bavarian State Opera from 1858 through 1900. While there, he notably portrayed several characters in the world premieres of operas composed by Richard Wagner. He created Pogner in Die Meistersinger von Nürnberg (21 June 1868), Fafner in Das Rheingold (22 September 1869), Hunding in Die Walküre (26 June 1870) and Harald in Die Feen (29 June 1888).
