= Wilhelmine Ritter =

German opera singer

Wilhelmine Ritter was a German operatic mezzo-soprano. Little is known about the artist and the details about her birth and training are unknown. She was a member of the Bavarian State Opera in Munich from 1866 through 1871. While there she notably created the roles of Floßhilde in Richard Wagner's Das Rheingold on 22 September 1869 and Grimgerde (one of the Valkyries) in Wagner's Die Walküre on 26 June 1869. Her last performance at the house was as Orfeo in Christoph Willibald Gluck's Orfeo ed Euridice in 1871. She got married soon after and retired permanently from the stage. Currently no further biographical details about Ritter have surfaced.
