= Henriette Müller-Marion =

German opera singer

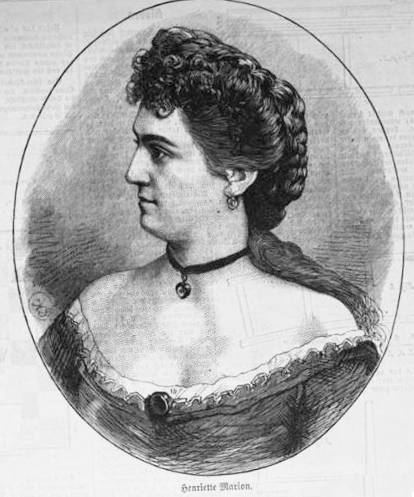
- Born: Henriette Marion; 5 February 1845; Wiesbaden
- Died: 11 July 1921 (aged 76); Munich
- Occupations: Operatic soprano; Voice teacher
- Organizations: Bavarian State Opera

Henriette Müller-Marion (born Henriette Marion, 5 February 1845 – 11 July 1921) was a German operatic soprano, composer and voice teacher who appeared at German court operas and in Belgium.

== Biography ==
Henriette Marion was born in Wiesbaden on 5 February 1845. She belonged, beginning in 1864, to the court theatres of Wiesbaden and Braunschweig. From 1867, she was a member of the Royal Opera Munich where she performed coloratura roles and lyric-dramatic roles. She is best remembered for creating roles in Wagner's Der Ring des Nibelungen at the Munch Court Theatre, Freia in Das Rheingold on 22 September 1896, and Ortlinde in Die Walküre on 26 June 1870.

She appeared later at the Cologne Opera, and at opera houses in Belgium, La Monnaie in Brussels, and in Liège, Ghent and at the French Opera of Antwerp. Her roles included Leonore in Beethoven's Fidelio, Donna Anna in Moart's Don Giovanni, Rachel in Halévy's La Juive", the title role in Bizet's Carmen, Selika in Meyerbeer's L'Africaine and Senta in Wagner's Der fliegende Holländer. She retired from the stage in Ghent in 1890, as Valentine in Meyerbeer'sLes Huguenots.

After her singing cereer, she worked as a voice teacher in Bonn and Munich. She composed songs and duets. She died in Munich on 11 July 1921.

== Literature ==
- Ludwig Eisenberg: Müller-Marion, Henriette, in Großes biographisches Lexikon der Deutschen Bühne im XIX. Jahrhundert. Verlag Paul List, Leipzig 1903, p. 1172
