= Marie Haupt =

German operatic soprano (1849–1928)

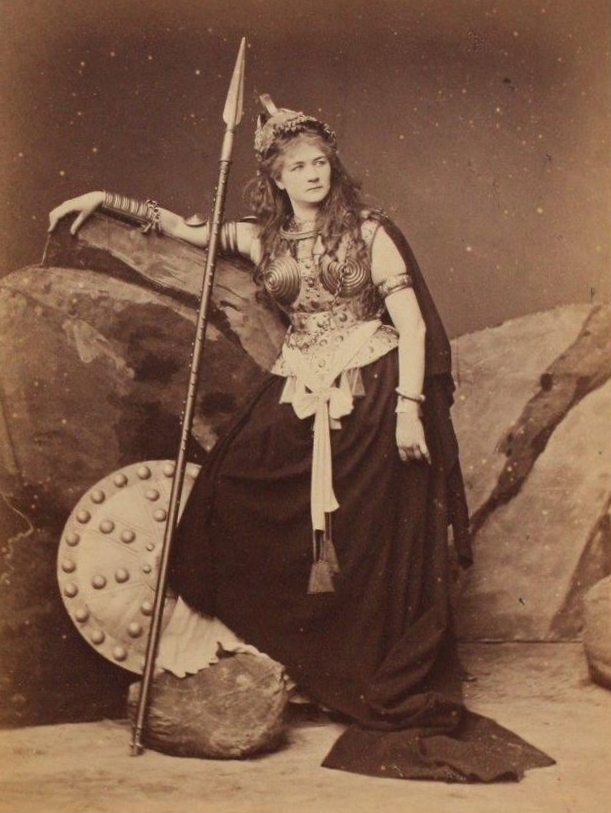
Marie Haupt

Marie Haupt (18 April 1849 – 1928) was a German operatic soprano who had an active career during the latter half of the 19th century. She is best remembered today for portraying several roles in the first complete presentation of Richard Wagner's The Ring Cycle at the very first Bayreuth Festival in 1876.

== Biography ==
Born in Danzig, Germany (now Gdańsk, Poland), Haupt studied in Berlin with the great prima donna Pauline Viardot and renowned pedagogue Eduard Mantius. She made her professional opera debut in 1870 at the Court Theater of Neustrelitz. Subsequent engagements took her to the Municipal Theater of Stettin (now Szczecin) and the Bavarian State Opera.

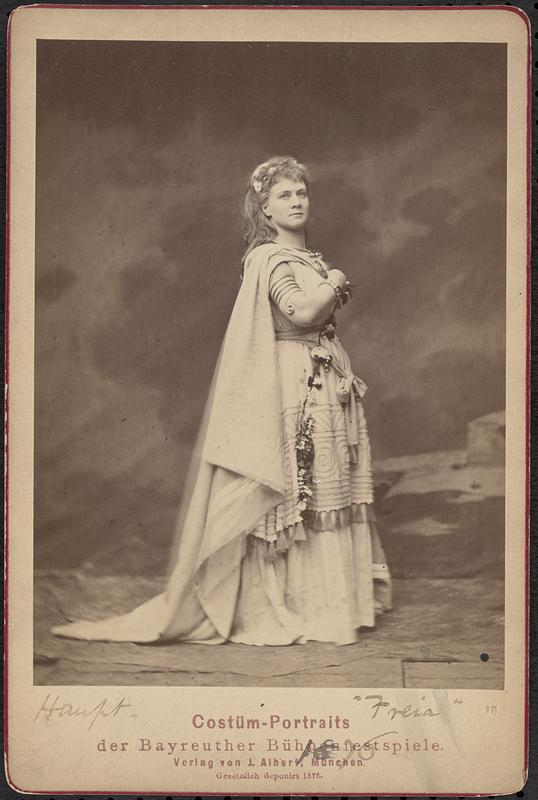
Haupt "Freia" 1876, 1876, Cabinet Card Collection, Boston Public Library

In 1873 Haupt became a principal soprano at the Court Theater of Kassel where she remained through 1877. She excelled in the coloratura soprano repertoire, portraying such roles as Ännchen in Der Freischütz, Elvira in I puritani, Frau Fluth in The Merry Wives of Windsor, and Marie in La fille du régiment. She also sang a few mezzo-soprano roles like Urbain in Les Huguenots and Venus in Tannhäuser. After marrying the famous Wagnerian tenor Georg Unger (1837–1887), she appeared on the stage as Marie Unger-Haupt.

Haupt's participation in the first presentation of the complete Ring Cycle at the Bayreuth Festival in 1876 was the pinnacle achievement of her career. This was the first time that the third opera in the ring, Siegfried, was heard and Haupt created the role of the Forestbird when it premiered on August 16, 1876. She also portrayed Freia in Das Rheingold (August 13) and Gerhilde in Die Walküre (August 14) during the 1876 Wagner performances.

From 1877 until her retirement from the stage in 1880, Haupt was committed to the opera house in Mainz. She died in Leipzig at the age of 79.
