= Franz Betz =

German opera singer

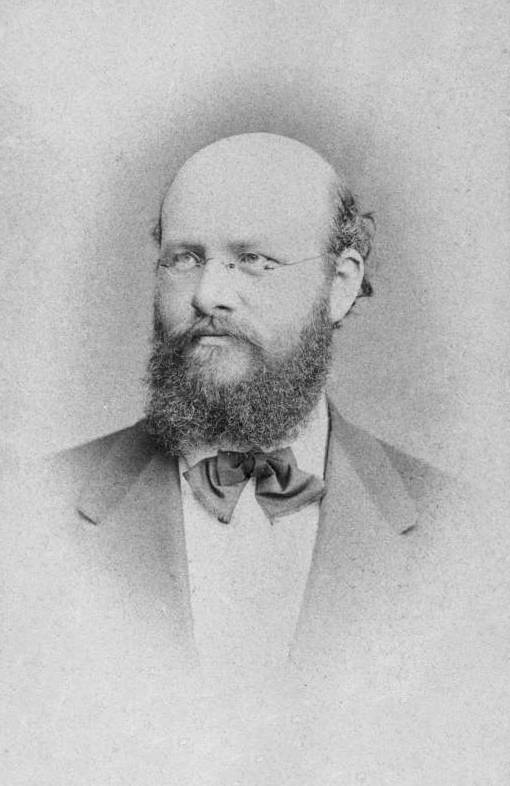
Franz Betz (1835–1900)

Franz Betz (19 March 1835 – 11 August 1900) was a German bass-baritone opera singer who sang at the Berlin State Opera from 1859 to 1897. He was particularly known for his performances in operas by Richard Wagner and created the role of Hans Sachs in Die Meistersinger von Nürnberg.

== Biography ==
Franz Betz was born in Mainz and trained as a singer in Karlsruhe. He made his debut in 1856 at the Court Theater of Hanover as The Herald in Wagner's Lohengrin, after which he sang as a guest performer in various other German opera houses. His 1859 success at the Berlin State Opera in the role of Don Carlo in Verdi's Ernani, led to a permanent contract with the company.

He became one of Wagner's most trusted singers, and sang the role of Hans Sachs in the world premiere of his Die Meistersinger von Nürnberg (National Theatre Munich, 1868). Betz sang the role more than a hundred times and was closely identified with the character. He also sang Wotan in Das Rheingold and Die Walküre and The Wanderer in Siegfried for the first complete performance of Der Ring des Nibelungen (Bayreuth Festspielhaus, 1876). In May 1872, he was one of the four soloists in the performance of Beethoven's Ninth Symphony to mark the laying of the foundation stone for the Bayreuth Festspielhaus.

From 1882 to 1890, he served as the first president of the Genossenschaft Deutscher Bühnen-Angehöriger (the German trade union for stage artists, technicians and administrative staff). He never sang in operas in either the United States or the United Kingdom, although he sang in concerts in London in 1882 and 1889. His singing in the 1889 concert when he was in his mid-fifties was described as "still without flaw".

Upon his retirement from the stage in 1897, Betz was made a Kammersänger of the Berlin State Opera. Franz Betz died on 11 August 1900 in Berlin and is buried in the Kaiser-Wilhelm-Gedächtnis-Friedhof there. He was married to the coloratura soprano, Johanna Betz (1837–1906).

== Sources ==
- Newman, Ernest, The Life of Richard Wagner (4 Vols). Alfred Knopf, 1946.
- Rosenthal, H. and Warrack, J., "Betz, Franz", The Concise Oxford Dictionary of Opera, 2nd Edition, Oxford University Press, 1979, p. 49. ISBN 0-19-311321-X
