= Franz Nachbaur =

German opera singer (1835–1902)

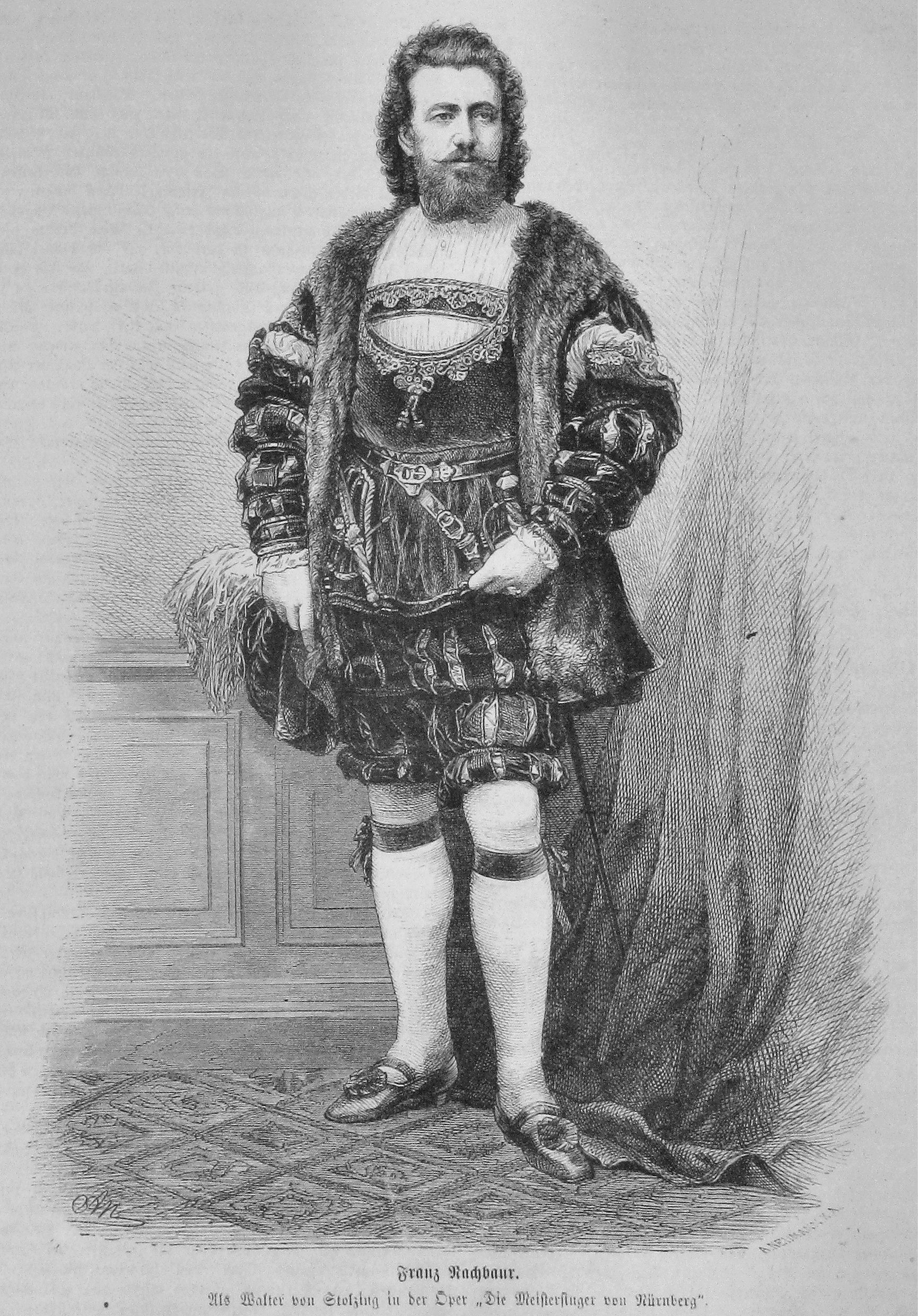
1873 sketch of Nachbauer

Franz Innozenz Stahl Nachbauer (March 25, 1835 – March 21, 1902) was a German opera tenor. Born in Giessen, he studied with Giovanni Battista Lamperti in Milan and with the celebrated baritone, Jan Krtitel Pisek, in Stuttgart. He made his debut on the stage in Passau in 1857 and was active until his retirement in 1890. He died in Munich, at age 66.

== Roles created ==
- Walther von Stolzing in Wagner's Die Meistersinger on 21 June 1868.
- Froh in Wagner's Das Rheingold on 22 September 1869.
