= Ferdinand Leeke =

German painter (1859–1923)

Ferdinand Leeke (7 April 1859 – 1923) was a German Painter, famous for his depictions of scenes from Wagnerian Operas. A native of Burg bei Magdeburg, Germany, he studied at the Munich Academy under Ludwig von Herterich (1843–1905) and Sándor Liezen-Mayer, a genre and historical painter, and with Alexander von Wagner (1838–1919), a Hungarian genre and landscape painter.

Around 1889, Siegfried Wagner, the son of the composer Richard Wagner, commissioned Leeke to paint a series of paintings showing scenes from ten operas by Wagner.

== Wagner Pictures ==
- Rienzi: Act IV, Scene II
- The Flying Dutchman: Act III, Finale
- Tannhauser: Act III, Scene I.
- Lohengrin: Act III, Finale
- The Rheingold: Scene II
- The Valkyrie: Act I.
- Siegfried: Act II
- Götterdämmerung: Act III
- Tristan and Isolde: Act II
- The Mastersingers of Nuremberg: Act III

== Gallery ==
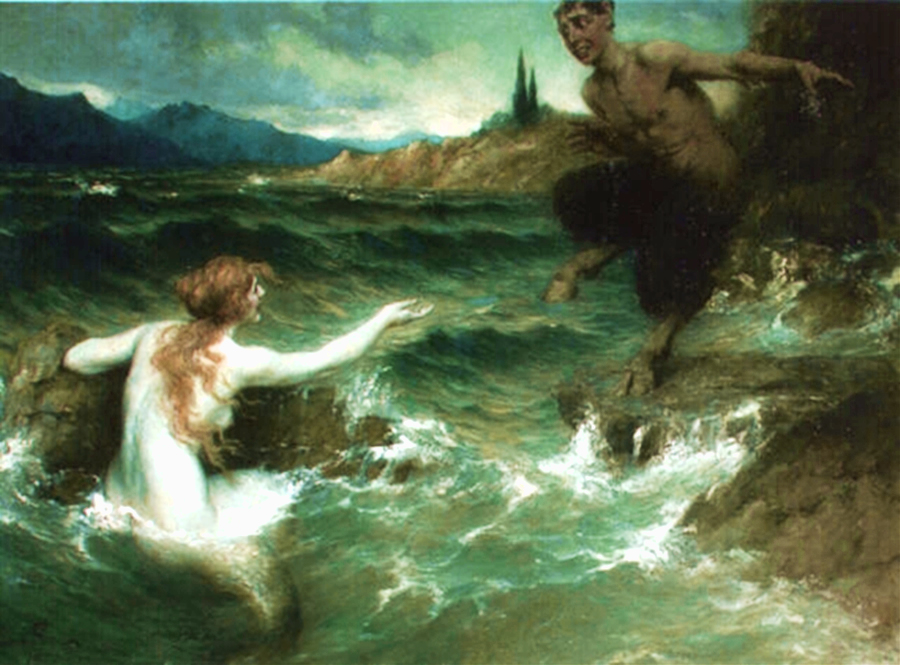
The Mermaid and the Satyr (1917)

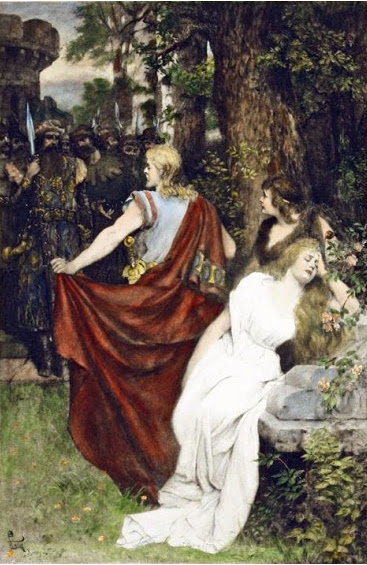
Tristan und Isolde

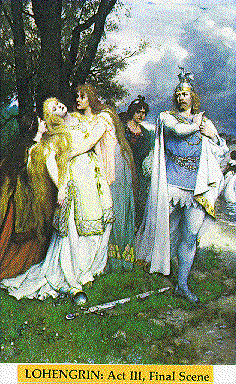
Lohengrin

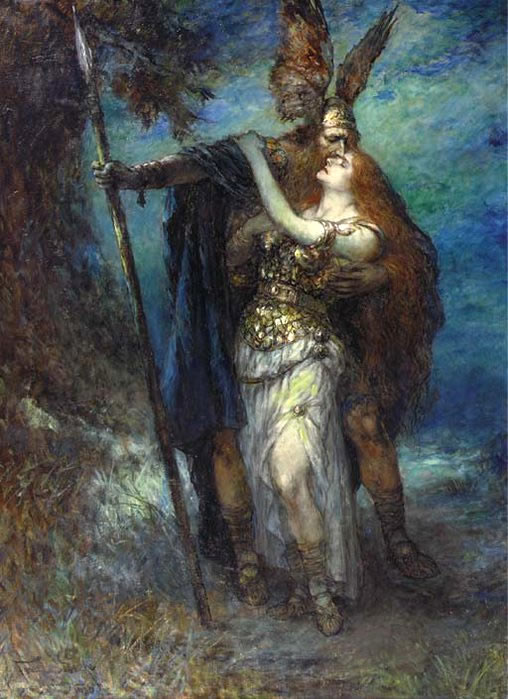
Wotan and Brünnhilde (1930)

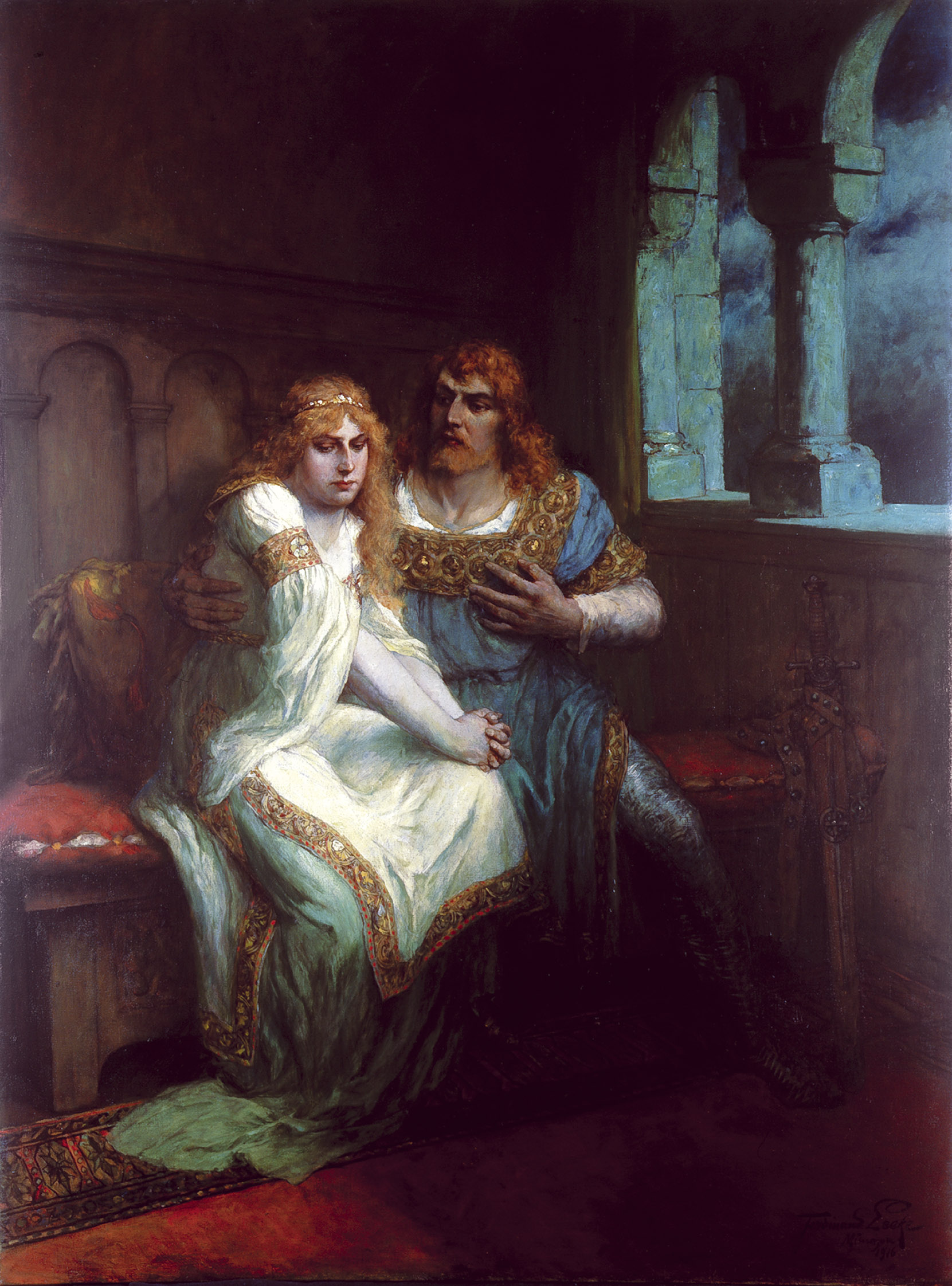
Lohengrin (1916)
