= John L. DiGaetani =

American academic (born 1943)

John Louis DiGaetani (born 1943) is a Professor of English at Hofstra University in Hempstead, New York.

He received his BA from the University of Illinois at Urbana-Champaign, his MA from Northern Illinois University, and his Ph.D. from the University of Wisconsin–Madison. DiGaetani's published works include studies on modern British literature, modern American literature, opera, and the connections between literature and music. He is also director of Hofstra's London Program.

He is the author of:

- The Definitive Diva: The Life and Career of Maria Callas
- Richard Wagner: New Light on a Musical Life
- Wagner Outside the Ring: Essays on the Operas, Their Performance, and Their Connections with Other Arts
- Stages of Struggle: Modern Playwrights and Their Psychological Inspirations
- Penetrating Wagner's "Ring"
- Richard Wagner and the Modern British Novel
- An Invitation to the Opera
- Puccini the Thinker
- A Search for a Postmodern Theater: Interviews with Contemporary Playwrights
- Inside the Ring: Essays on Wagner's Opera Cycle
- Wagner and Suicide
- A Companion to Pirandello Studies
- Carlo Gozzi: A Life
- Carlo Gozzi: Translations of "The Love of Three Oranges," "Turandot," and "The Snake Lady" with a Bio-Critical Introduction
