= Die Meistersinger von Nürnberg =

1868 opera by Richard Wagner

- Music drama by Richard Wagner
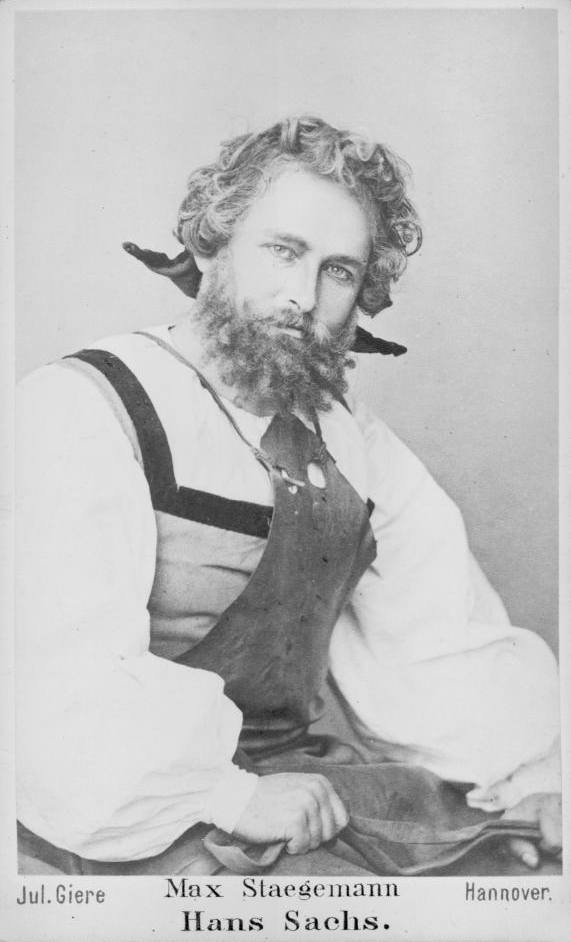
- Max Staegemann as Hans Sachs
- Translation: The Mastersingers of Nuremberg
- Librettist: Richard Wagner
- Language: German
- Premiere: 21 June 1868; National Theatre Munich in Munich

Die Meistersinger von Nürnberg (German: [diː ˈmaɪstɐˌzɪŋɐ fɔn ˈnʏʁnbɛːɐk]; "The Master-Singers of Nuremberg"), WWV 96, is a music drama, or opera, in three acts, by Richard Wagner. It is the longest opera commonly performed, taking nearly four and a half hours, not counting two breaks between acts, and is traditionally not cut. With Hans von Bülow conducting, it was first performed on 21 June 1868 at the National Theater in Munich, today home of Bavarian State Opera.

The story is set in Nuremberg in the mid-16th century. At the time, Nuremberg was a free imperial city and one of the centers of the Renaissance in Northern Europe. The story revolves around the city's guild of Meistersinger (Master Singers), an association of amateur poets and musicians who were primarily master craftsmen of various trades. The master singers had developed a craftsmanlike approach to music-making, with an intricate system of rules for composing and performing songs. The work draws much of its atmosphere from its depiction of the Nuremberg of the era and the traditions of the master-singer guild. One of the main characters, the cobbler-poet Hans Sachs, is based on a historical figure, Hans Sachs (1494–1576), the most famous of the master-singers.

Die Meistersinger von Nürnberg occupies a unique place in Wagner's oeuvre. It is the only comedy among his mature operas (he had come to reject his early Das Liebesverbot) and is also unusual among his works in being set in a historically well-defined time and place rather than in a mythical or legendary setting. It is the only mature Wagner opera based on an entirely original story, and in which no supernatural or magical powers or events feature. It incorporates many of the operatic conventions that Wagner had railed against in his essays on the theory of opera: rhymed verse, arias, choruses, a quintet, and even a ballet.

The autograph manuscript of the opera is preserved in the Germanisches Nationalmuseum.

== Composition history ==
Wagner's autobiography Mein Leben (My Life) described the genesis of Die Meistersinger. Taking the waters at Marienbad in 1845 he began reading Georg Gottfried Gervinus' Geschichte der deutschen Dichtung (History of German Poetry). This work included chapters on master song and on Hans Sachs.

I had formed a particularly vivid picture of Hans Sachs and the mastersingers of Nuremberg. I was especially intrigued by the institution of the Marker and his function in rating master-songs ... I conceived during a walk a comic scene in which the popular artisan-poet, by hammering upon his cobbler's last, gives the Marker, who is obliged by circumstances to sing in his presence, his come-uppance for previous pedantic misdeeds during official singing contests, by inflicting upon him a lesson of his own.

Gervinus' book also mentions a poem by the real-life Hans Sachs on the subject of Protestant reformer Martin Luther, called "Die Wittenbergisch Nachtigall" (The Wittenberg Nightingale). The opening lines for this poem, addressing the Reformation, were later used by Wagner in Act III Scene 5 when the crowd acclaims Sachs: "Wacht auf, es nahet gen den Tag; ich hör' singen im grünen Hag ein wonnigliche Nachtigall." (Awake, the dawn is drawing near; I hear, singing in the green grove, a blissful nightingale)

In addition to this, Wagner added a scene drawn from his own life, in which a case of mistaken identity led to a near-riot: this was to be the basis for the finale of Act II.

Out of this situation evolved an uproar, which through the shouting and clamour and an inexplicable growth in the number of participants in the struggle soon assumed a truly demoniacal character. It looked to me as if the whole town would break out into a riot...Then suddenly I heard a heavy thump, and as if by magic the whole crowd dispersed in every direction...One of the regular patrons had felled one of the noisiest rioters ... And it was the effect of this which had scattered everybody so suddenly.

This first draft of the story was dated "Marienbad 16 July 1845". Wagner later said, in Eine Mitteilung an meine Freunde (1851) (A Communication to my Friends) that Meistersinger was to be a comic opera to follow a tragic opera, i.e. Tannhäuser. Just as the Athenians had followed a tragedy with a comic satyr play, so Wagner would follow Tannhäuser with Meistersinger: the link being that both operas included song-contests.

=== Influence of Schopenhauer ===
In 1854, Wagner first read Schopenhauer, and was struck by the philosopher's theories on aesthetics. In this philosophy, art is a means for escaping from the sufferings of the world, and music is the highest of the arts since it is the only one not involved in representation of the world (i.e. it is abstract). It is for this reason that music can communicate emotion without the need for words. In his earlier essay Oper und Drama (Opera and Drama) (1850–1) Wagner had derided staples of operatic construction: arias, choruses, duets, trios, recitatives, etc. As a result of reading Schopenhauer's ideas about the role of music, Wagner re-evaluated his prescription for opera, and included many of these elements in Die Meistersinger.

Although Die Meistersinger is a comedy, it also elucidates Wagner's ideas on the place of music in society, on renunciation of Wille (Will), and on the solace that music can bring in a world full of Wahn (delusion, folly, self-deception). It is Wahn which causes the riot in Act II – a sequence of events arising from a case of mistaken identity, which can be seen as a form of self-delusion. Commentators have observed that in his famous Act III monologue Wahn, Wahn, überall Wahn (Madness! Madness!, Everywhere madness!), Sachs paraphrases Schopenhauer's description of the way that Wahn drives a person to behave in ways that are self-destructive:

in Flucht geschlagen, wähnt er zu jagen; hört nicht sein eigen Schmerzgekreisch,
wenn er sich wühlt ins eig'ne Fleisch, wähnt Lust sich zu erzeigen!

driven into flight he believes he is hunting, and does not hear his own cry of pain:
when he tears into his own flesh, he imagines he is giving himself pleasure!

Following the completion of Tristan und Isolde, Wagner resumed work on Die Meistersinger in 1861 with a quite different philosophical outlook from that which he held when he developed his first draft. The character of Hans Sachs became one of the most Schopenhauerian of Wagner's creations. Wagner scholar Lucy Beckett has noted the remarkable similarity between Wagner's Sachs and Schopenhauer's description of the noble man:

We always picture a very noble character to ourselves as having a certain trace of silent sadness... It is a consciousness that has resulted from knowledge of the vanity of all achievements and of the suffering of all life, not merely of one's own. (Schopenhauer: The World as Will and Representation)

The other distinctive manifestation of Sachs's character – his calm renunciation of the prospect of becoming a suitor for Eva's love – is also deeply Schopenhauerian. Sachs here denies the Will in its supposedly most insistent form, that of sexual love. Wagner marks this moment with a direct musical and textual reference to Tristan und Isolde: Mein Kind, von Tristan und Isolde kenn' ich ein traurig Stück. Hans Sachs war klug und wollte nichts von Herrn Markes Glück. ("My child, I know a sad tale of Tristan and Isolde. Hans Sachs was clever and did not want anything of King Marke's lot.")

=== Completion and premiere ===
Having completed the scenario, Wagner began writing the libretto while living in Paris in 1862, and followed this by composing the overture. The overture was publicly performed in Leipzig on 2 November 1862, conducted by the composer. Composition of Act I was begun in spring of 1863 in the Viennese suburb of Penzing, but the opera in its entirety was not finished until October 1867, when Wagner was living at Tribschen near Lucerne. These years were some of Wagner's most difficult: the 1861 Paris production of Tannhäuser was a fiasco, Wagner gave up hope of completing Der Ring des Nibelungen, the 1864 Vienna production of Tristan und Isolde was abandoned after 77 rehearsals, and finally in 1866 Wagner's first wife, Minna, died. Cosima Wagner was later to write: "When future generations seek refreshment in this unique work, may they spare a thought for the tears from which the smiles arose."

The premiere was given at the Königliches Hof- und National-Theater, Munich, on 21 June 1868. The production was sponsored by Ludwig II of Bavaria and the conductor was Hans von Bülow. Franz Strauss, the father of the composer Richard Strauss, played the French horn at the premiere, despite his often-expressed dislike of Wagner, who was present at many of the rehearsals. Wagner's frequent interruptions and digressions made rehearsals a very long-winded affair. After one 5 hour rehearsal, Franz Strauss led a strike by the orchestra, saying that he could not play any more. Despite these problems, the premiere was a triumph, and the opera was hailed as one of Wagner's most successful works. At the end of the first performance, the audience called for Wagner, who appeared at the front of the Royal box, which he had been sharing with King Ludwig. Wagner bowed to the crowd, breaking court protocol, which dictated that only the monarch could address an audience from the box.

== Roles ==
Roles, voice types, premiere cast
| Role | Voice type | Premiere cast, 21 June 1868 Conductor: Hans von Bülow |
|---|---|---|
| Eva, Pogner's daughter | soprano | Mathilde Mallinger |
| David, Sachs's apprentice | tenor | Max Schlosser |
| Walther von Stolzing, young knight from Franconia | tenor | Franz Nachbaur |
| Sixtus Beckmesser, town clerk, mastersinger | baritone | Gustav Hölzel |
| Hans Sachs, cobbler, mastersinger | bass-baritone | Franz Betz |
| Veit Pogner, goldsmith, mastersinger | bass | Kaspar Bausewein |
Supporting roles:
| Magdalena, Eva's nurse | soprano | Sophie Dietz |
| Kunz Vogelgesang, furrier, mastersinger | tenor | Karl Samuel Heinrich |
| Balthasar Zorn, pewterer, mastersinger | tenor | Bartholomäus Weixlstorfer |
| Augustin Moser, tailor, mastersinger | tenor | Michael Pöppl |
| Ulrich Eisslinger, grocer, mastersinger | tenor | Eduard Hoppe |
| Fritz Kothner, baker, mastersinger | baritone | Karl Fischer |
| Nachtwächter, or Nightwatchman | bass | Ferdinand Lang |
| Konrad Nachtigall, tinsmith, mastersinger | bass | Eduard Sigl |
| Hermann Ortel, soapmaker, mastersinger | bass | Franz Thoms |
| Hans Foltz, coppersmith, mastersinger | bass | Ludwig Hayn |
| Hans Schwarz, stocking weaver, mastersinger | bass | Leopold Grasser |
Citizens of all guilds and their wives, journeymen, apprentices, young women, people of Nuremberg

== Instrumentation ==
Overture
Performed by the Skidmore College Orchestra.

Die Meistersinger von Nürnberg is scored for the following instruments:

- piccolo, 2 flutes, 2 oboes, 2 clarinets, 2 bassoons
- 4 horns, 3 trumpets, 3 trombones, tuba
- timpani, bass drum, cymbals, triangle, glockenspiel
- harp
- 1st and 2nd violins, violas, violoncellos, and double basses

on-stage

- more trumpets and horns, stierhorn, lute, military drums, organ (Act I)

== Synopsis ==
Nuremberg, towards the middle of the sixteenth century. (Note: Hans Sachs refers to himself as a widower in the course of the drama, which is set on June 23 and 24 (St. John's Eve and St. John's Day). The historic Sachs's first wife died in 1560, and he remarried on September 2, 1561; therefore, the drama can be fairly precisely set on either June 23/24, 1560 or June 23/24, 1561.)

=== Act 1 ===
Prelude

Scene 1: Interior of Katharinenkirche (St. Catherine's Church) (Note: St Catherine's was destroyed in 1945 during World War II.) in Nuremberg, Saint John's Eve or Midsummer's Eve, June 23

After the prelude, a church service is just ending with a singing of Da zu dir der Heiland kam (When the Saviour came to thee), an impressive pastiche of a Lutheran chorale, as Walther von Stolzing, a young knight from Franconia, addresses Eva Pogner, whom he had met earlier, and asks her if she is engaged to anyone. Eva and Walther have fallen in love at first sight, but she informs him that her father, the goldsmith and mastersinger Veit Pogner, has arranged to give her hand in marriage to the winner of the guild's song contest on Saint John's Day (Midsummer's Day), tomorrow. Eva's maid, Magdalena, gets David, Hans Sachs's apprentice, to tell Walther about the mastersingers' art. The hope is for Walther to qualify as a mastersinger during the guild meeting, traditionally held in the church after Mass, and thus earn a place in the song contest despite his utter ignorance of the master-guild's rules and conventions.

Scene 2

As the other apprentices set up the church for the meeting, David warns Walther that it is not easy to become a mastersinger; it takes many years of learning and practice. David gives a confusing lecture on the mastersingers' rules for composing and singing. (Many of the tunes he describes were real master-tunes from the period.) Walther is confused by the complicated rules, but is determined to try for a place in the guild anyway.

Scene 3

The first mastersingers file into the church, including Eva's wealthy father Veit Pogner and the town clerk Beckmesser. Beckmesser, a clever technical singer who was expecting to win the contest without opposition, is distressed to see that Walther is Pogner's guest and intends to enter the contest. Meanwhile, Pogner introduces Walther to the other mastersingers as they arrive. Fritz Kothner the baker, serving as chairman of this meeting, calls the roll. Pogner, addressing the assembly, announces his offer of his daughter's hand for the winner of the song contest. When Hans Sachs argues that Eva ought to have a say in the matter, Pogner agrees that Eva may refuse the winner of the contest, but she must still marry a mastersinger. Another suggestion by Sachs, that the townspeople, rather than the masters, should be called upon to judge the winner of the contest, is rejected by the other masters. Pogner formally introduces Walther as a candidate for admission into the master guild. Questioned by Kothner about his background, Walther states that his teacher in poetry was Walther von der Vogelweide whose works he studied in his own private library in Franconia, and his teachers in music were the birds and nature itself. Reluctantly the masters agree to admit him, provided he can perform a master-song of his own composition. Walther chooses love as the topic for his song and therefore is to be judged by Beckmesser alone, the "Marker" of the guild for worldly matters. At the signal to begin (Fanget an!), Walther launches into a novel free-form tune (So rief der Lenz in den Wald), breaking all the mastersingers' rules, and his song is constantly interrupted by the scratch of Beckmesser's chalk on his chalkboard, maliciously noting one violation after another. When Beckmesser has completely covered the slate with symbols of Walther's errors, he interrupts the song and argues that there is no point in finishing it. Sachs tries to convince the masters to let Walther continue, but Beckmesser sarcastically tells Sachs to stop trying to set policy and instead, to finish making his (Beckmesser's) new shoes, which are overdue. Raising his voice over the masters' argument, Walther finishes his song, but the masters reject him and he rushes out of the church.

=== Act 2 ===
Evening. On the street corner by Pogner's and Sachs's houses. A linden tree (tilia or lime-tree or basswood) stands outside Pogner's house, a Flieder-tree (syringa or lilac-tree) before Sachs's. Apprentices are closing the shutters.

Scene 1

The apprentices sing joyfully about St. John's Day, also called Midsummer Day, and its accompanying garlands of flowers and ribbons ("Johannistag! Johannistag!"). David informs Magdalena of Walther's failure. In her disappointment, Magdalena leaves without giving David the food she had brought for him. This arouses the derision of the other apprentices, and David is about to turn on them when Sachs arrives and hustles his apprentice into the workshop.

Scene 2

Pogner arrives with Eva, engaging in a roundabout conversation: Eva is hesitant to ask about the outcome of Walther's application, and Pogner has private doubts about whether it was wise to offer his daughter's hand in marriage for the song contest. As they enter their house, Magdalena appears and tells Eva about the rumours of Walther's failure. Eva decides to ask Sachs about the matter.

Scene 3

As twilight falls, Hans Sachs takes a seat in front of his house to work on new shoes for Beckmesser. He muses about Walther's song, which has made a deep impression on him (Was duftet doch der Flieder, known as the Flieder Monologue).

Scene 4

Eva approaches Sachs, and they discuss tomorrow's song contest. Eva is unenthusiastic about Beckmesser, who appears to be the only eligible contestant. She hints that she would not mind if Sachs, a widower, were to win the contest. Though touched, Sachs protests that he would be too old a husband for her. Upon further prompting, Sachs describes Walther's failure at the guild meeting. This causes Eva to storm off angrily, confirming Sachs's suspicion that she has fallen in love with Walther. Eva is intercepted by Magdalena, who informs her that Beckmesser is coming to serenade her. Eva, determined to search for Walther, tells Magdalena to pose as her (Eva) at the bedroom window.

Scene 5

Just as Eva is about to leave, Walther appears. He tells her that he has been rejected by the mastersingers, and the two prepare to elope. However, Sachs has overheard their plans. As they are passing by, he illuminates the street with his lantern, forcing them to hide in the shadow of Pogner's house. Walther makes up his mind to confront Sachs, but is interrupted by the arrival of Beckmesser.

Scene 6

As Eva and Walther retreat further into the shadows, Beckmesser begins his serenade. Sachs interrupts him by launching into a full-bellied cobbling song, and hammering the soles of the half-made shoes. Annoyed, Beckmesser tells Sachs to stop, but the cobbler replies that he has to finish tempering the soles of the shoes, whose lateness Beckmesser had publicly complained about (in Act I). Sachs offers a compromise: he will be quiet and let Beckmesser sing, but he (Sachs) will be Beckmesser's "marker", and mark each of Beckmesser's musical/poetical errors by striking one of the soles with his hammer. Beckmesser, who has spotted someone at Eva's window (Magdalena in disguise), has no time to argue. He tries to sing his serenade, but he makes so many mistakes (his tune repeatedly places accents on the wrong syllables of the words) that from the repeated knocks Sachs finishes the shoes. David wakes up and sees Beckmesser apparently serenading Magdalena. He attacks Beckmesser in a fit of jealous rage. The entire neighborhood is awakened by the noise. The other apprentices rush into the fray, and the situation degenerates into a full-blown riot. In the confusion, Walther tries to escape with Eva, but Sachs pushes Eva into her home and drags Walther into his own workshop. Quiet is restored as abruptly as it was broken. A lone figure walks through the street – the nightwatchman, calling out the hour.

=== Act 3 ===
Prelude, a meditative orchestral introduction using music from two key episodes to be heard in act 3: Sachs's scene 1 monologue "Wahn! Wahn!" and the "Wittenberg Nightingale" quasi-chorale sung by the townspeople to greet Sachs in scene 5. The music of the prelude also quotes Sachs cobbling song from act 2, which according to Wagner's description is “as though the man were turning his gaze from his handiwork heavenwards and losing himself in tender reveries.”

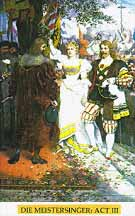
Act 3, painting by Ferdinand Leeke

Scene 1: Sachs's workshop

As morning dawns, Sachs is reading a large book. Lost in thought, he does not respond as David returns from delivering Beckmesser's shoes. David finally manages to attract his master's attention, and they discuss the upcoming festivities – it is Saint John's day, Hans Sachs's name day. David recites his verses for Sachs, and leaves to prepare for the festival. Alone, Sachs ponders last night's riot. "Madness! Madness! Everywhere madness!" (Wahn! Wahn! Überall Wahn!) His attempt to prevent an elopement had ended in shocking violence. Nevertheless, he is resolved to make madness work for him today.

Scene 2

Sachs gives Walther an interactive lesson on the history and philosophy of music and mastersinging, and teaches him to moderate his singing according to the spirit (if not the strict letter) of the masters' rules. Walther demonstrates his understanding by composing two sections of a new Prize Song in a more acceptable style than his previous effort from Act I. Sachs writes down the new verses as Walther sings them. A final section remains to be composed, but Walther postpones the task. The two men leave the room to dress for the festival.

Scene 3

Beckmesser, still sore from his drubbing the night before, enters the workshop. He spots the verses of the Prize Song, written in Sachs's handwriting, and infers (erroneously) that Sachs is secretly planning to enter the contest for Eva's hand. The cobbler re-enters the room and Beckmesser confronts him with the verses and asks if he wrote them. Sachs confirms that the handwriting is his, but does not clarify that he was not the author but merely served as scribe. However, he goes on to say that he has no intention of wooing Eva or entering the contest, and he presents the manuscript to Beckmesser as a gift. He promises never to claim the song for his own, and warns Beckmesser that it is a very difficult song to interpret and sing. Beckmesser, his confidence restored by the prospect of using verses written by the famous Hans Sachs, ignores the warning and rushes off to prepare for the song contest. Sachs smiles at Beckmesser's foolishness but expresses hope that Beckmesser will learn to be better in the future.

Scene 4

Eva arrives at the workshop. She is looking for Walther, but pretends to have complaints about a shoe that Sachs made for her. Sachs realizes that the shoe is a perfect fit, but pretends to set about altering the stitching. As he works, he tells Eva that he has just heard a beautiful song, lacking only an ending. Eva cries out as Walther enters the room, splendidly attired for the festival, and sings the third and final section of the Prize Song. The couple are overwhelmed with gratitude for Sachs, and Eva asks Sachs to forgive her for having manipulated his feelings. The cobbler brushes them off with bantering complaints about his lot as a shoemaker, poet, and widower. At last, however, he admits to Eva that, despite his feelings for her, he is resolved to avoid the fate of King Marke (a reference to the subject of another Wagner opera, Tristan und Isolde, in which an old man tries to marry a much younger woman), thus conferring his blessing upon the lovers. David and Magdalena appear. Sachs announces to the group that a new master-song has been born, which, following the rules of the mastersingers, is to be baptized. As an apprentice cannot serve as a witness for the baptism, he promotes David to the rank of journeyman with the traditional cuff on the ear (and by this also "promoting" him as a groom and Magdalena as a bride). He then christens the Prize Song the Morning Dream Song (Selige Morgentraumdeut-Weise). After celebrating their good fortune with an extended quintet (Selig, wie die Sonne meines Glückes lacht) – musically capping the first four scenes of act 3 – the group departs for the festival.

Scene 5

Almost an act in itself, this scene occupies about 45 minutes of the two hours of act 3 and is separated from the preceding four scenes by Verwandlungsmusik, a transforming interlude. Meadow by the Pegnitz River. It is the Feast of St. John.

Various guilds enter boasting of their contributions to Nürnberg's success; Wagner depicts three of them: the Cobblers, whose chorus Sankt Krispin, lobet ihn! uses the signature cry streck! streck! streck!; the Tailors, who sing the chorus Als Nürnberg belagert war with the goat cry meck! meck! meck!; and the Bakers, who cut the tailors off with Hungersnot! Hungersnot!, or Famine, famine!, and its beck! beck! beck!, or bake, bake, bake!

This leads into the Tanz der Lehrbuben (Dance of the Apprentices). The mastersingers themselves then grandly arrive: the Procession of the Masters. The crowd sings the praises of Hans Sachs, the most beloved and famous of the mastersingers; here Wagner provides a rousing chorus, Wach' auf, es nahet gen den Tag, using words written by the historical Sachs himself, in a chorale-like four-part setting, relating it to the chorales of the "Wittenberg Nightingale" (a metaphor for Martin Luther).

"Morgenlich leuchtend im rosigen Schein" (Walther's Prize song)
Sung by Leo Slezak in 1910 for Edison Records

The prize contest begins. Beckmesser attempts to sing the verses that he had obtained from Sachs. However, he garbles the words (Morgen ich leuchte) and fails to fit them to an appropriate melody, and ends up singing so clumsily that the crowd laughs him off. Before storming off in anger, he yells that the song was not even his: Hans Sachs tricked him into singing it. The crowd is confused. How could the great Hans Sachs have written such a bad song? Sachs tells them that the song is not his own, and also that it is in fact a beautiful song which the masters will love when they hear it sung correctly. To prove this, he calls a witness: Walther. The people are so curious about the song (correctly worded as Morgenlich leuchtend im rosigen Schein) that they allow Walther to sing it, and everyone is won over in spite of its novelty.

They declare Walther the winner, and the mastersingers want to make him a member of their guild on the spot. At first Walther is tempted to reject their offer, but Sachs intervenes once more and explains that art, even ground-breaking, contrary art like Walther's, can only exist within a cultural tradition, which tradition the art sustains and improves. Walther is convinced; he agrees to join. Pogner places the symbolic master-hood medal around his neck, Eva takes his hand, and the people sing once more the praises of Hans Sachs, the beloved mastersinger of Nuremberg.

== Reception ==
Die Meistersinger was enthusiastically received at its premiere in 1868, and was judged to be Wagner's most immediately appealing work. Eduard Hanslick wrote in Die Neue Freie Presse after the premiere: "Dazzling scenes of colour and splendour, ensembles full of life and character unfold before the spectator's eyes, hardly allowing him the leisure to weigh how much and how little of these effects is of musical origin."

Within a year of the premiere the opera was performed across Germany at Dresden, Dessau, Karlsruhe, Mannheim, Weimar, Hanover, and in Vienna, with Berlin following in 1870. It was one of the most popular and prominent German operas during the Unification of Germany in 1871, and in spite of the opera's overall warning against cultural self-centeredness, Die Meistersinger became a potent symbol of patriotic German art. Hans Sachs's final warning at the end of Act III on the need to preserve German art from foreign threats was a rallying point for German nationalism, particularly during the Franco-Prussian War.

Beware! Evil tricks threaten us; if the German people and kingdom should one day decay, under a false, foreign^{1} rule, soon no prince would understand his people; and foreign mists with foreign vanities they would plant in our German land; what is German and true none would know, if it did not live in the honour of German masters. Therefore I say to you: honour your German masters, then you will conjure up good spirits! And if you favour their endeavours, even if the Holy Roman Empire should dissolve in mist, for us there would yet remain holy German Art!

— Hans Sachs's final speech from Act III of Die Meistersinger
^{1} The word translated here as "foreign" ("welsch") is a catch-all term denoting "French and/or Italian." Wagner here referred to the court of Frederick the Great, where French rather than German was spoken.

Die Meistersinger was soon performed outside Germany as well, spreading throughout Europe and around the world:

- Bohemia: 26 April 1871, Prague
- Livonia: 4 January 1872, Riga
- Denmark: 23 March 1872, Copenhagen (in Danish)
- Netherlands: 12 March 1879, Rotterdam
- United Kingdom: 30 May 1882, London, Drury Lane Theatre under Hans Richter.
- Hungary: 8 September 1883, Budapest (in Hungarian)
- Switzerland: 20 February 1885, Basel
- Belgium: 7 March 1885, Brussels (in French)
- United States: 4 January 1886, New York, Metropolitan Opera House under Anton Seidl.
- Sweden: 2 April 1887, Stockholm (in Swedish)
- Italy: 26 December 1889, Milan (in Italian)
- Spain: 6 March 1894, Madrid, under Juan Goula (in Italian)
- Poland: 3 March 1896, Poznan
- France: 30 December 1896, Lyon (in French), Opéra National de Lyon
- Russia: 15 March 1898, St. Petersburg (in German)
- Argentina: 6 August 1898, Buenos Aires, Teatro de la Opera
- Portugal: January 1902, Lisbon
- Brazil: 3 August 1905, Rio de Janeiro
- South Africa: 1913, Johannesburg
- Finland: 17 November 1921, Helsinki
- Monaco: February 1928, Monte Carlo
- Yugoslavia: 15 June 1929, Zagreb
- Australia: March 1933, Melbourne
- Romania: December 1934, Bucharest

At the reopening of the Bayreuth Festival in 1924 following its closure during World War I Die Meistersinger was performed. The audience rose to its feet during Hans Sachs's final oration, and sang "Deutschland über Alles" after the opera had finished.

Die Meistersinger was frequently used as part of Nazi propaganda. On 21 March 1933, the founding of the Third Reich was celebrated with a performance of the opera in the presence of Adolf Hitler. The prelude to Act III is played over shots of old Nuremberg at the beginning of Triumph of the Will, the 1935 film by Leni Riefenstahl depicting the Nazi party congress of 1934. During World War II, Die Meistersinger was the only opera presented at the Bayreuth festivals of 1943–1944.

The association of Die Meistersinger with Nazism led to one of the most controversial stage productions of the work. The first Bayreuth production of Die Meistersinger following World War II occurred in 1956, when Wieland Wagner, the composer's grandson, attempted to distance the work from German nationalism by presenting it in almost abstract terms, by removing any reference to Nuremberg from the scenery. The production was dubbed Die Meistersinger ohne Nürnberg (The Mastersingers without Nuremberg).

== Criticisms of Beckmesser as a possible antisemitic trope ==
Beckmesser has been widely criticized as an antisemitic stereotype, ever since the idea was put forward by Theodor Adorno. Wagner scholar Barry Millington advanced the idea that Beckmesser represents a Jewish stereotype, whose humiliation by the Aryan Walther is an onstage representation of Wagner's antisemitism. Millington argued in his 1991 "Nuremberg Trial: Is There Anti-Semitism in Die Meistersinger?" that common antisemitic stereotypes prevalent in 19th-century Germany were a part of the "ideological fabric" of Die Meistersinger and that Beckmesser embodied these unmistakable antisemitic characteristics. Millington's article spurred significant debate among Wagner scholars including Charles Rosen, Hans Rudolph Vaget, Paul Lawrence Rose, and Karl A. Zaenker.

In a 2009 interview, Katharina Wagner, the composer's great-granddaughter and co-director of the Bayreuth Festival, was asked whether she believed Wagner relied on Jewish stereotypes in his operas. Her response was, "With Beckmesser he probably did." Nike Wagner, another of the composer's great-granddaughters, contends that Beckmesser is principally the victim of sadism, "which is inseparable from the syndrome that also produces violent fascism".

Scholars Dieter Borchmeyer, Udo Bermbach and Hermann Danuser support the thesis that with the character of Beckmesser, Wagner did not intend to allude to Jewish stereotypes, but rather to criticize (academic) pedantism in general. They point out similarities to the figure of Malvolio in Shakespeare's comedy Twelfth Night.

Although the score calls for Beckmesser to rush off in a huff after his self-defeating attempt to sing Walther's song, in some productions he remains and listens to Walther's correct rendition of his song, and shakes hands with Sachs after the final monologue.

A related view holds that Beckmesser was designed to parody the renowned critic Eduard Hanslick, who valorized the music of Brahms and held Wagner's music in low regard. We know that the original name of the Beckmesser character was "Veit Hanslich," and we know that Wagner invited Hanslick to his initial reading of the libretto, though whether then the character still had the "Hanslich" name when Hanslick heard it is unclear. This second interpretation of Beckmesser may dovetail with the antisemitism interpretation above, as Wagner attacked Hanslick as "of gracefully concealed Jewish origin" in his revised edition of his essay Jewishness in Music.
