= Max Schlosser (tenor) =

German opera singer

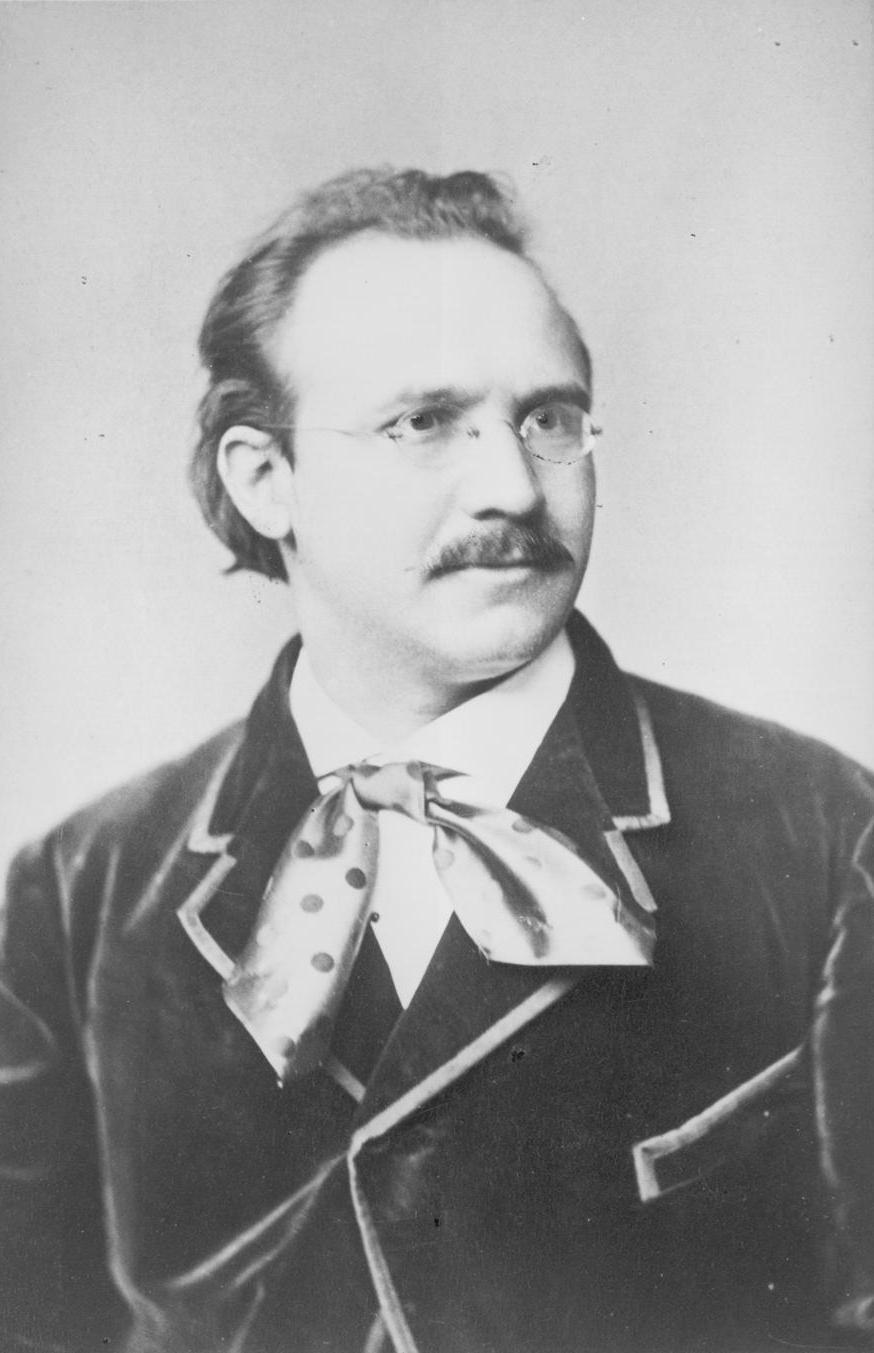
- Born: 17 October 1815; Amberg, Bavaria, Germany
- Died: 2 September 1916 (aged 100); Utting am Ammersee, Bavaria, Germany
- Occupation: Operatic tenor
- Organizations: Munich court opera; Bayreuth Festival

Max Karl Schlosser (17 October 1835 – 2 September 1916) was a German opera singer.

A tenor for most of his career, he later sang as a baritone and is remembered today for his character roles in Wagner's stage works. He created the roles of David in Die Meistersinger von Nürnberg (1868), Mime in Das Rheingold (1869), and The Messenger in the posthumous premiere of Wagner's early opera Die Feen (1888). Schlosser also performed as Mime at the Bayreuth Festival in the first complete performance of the Ring cycle in 1876 and in the cycle's first complete performance in London in 1882.

Schlosser was born in Amberg, Bavaria. He initially sang in operettas in Zürich, St Gallen and Augsburg to little success, and retired briefly to become a baker. However, in 1868 he took up his singing career again and was engaged by the Munich Hofoper. He remained with the company until 1904 when he gave his farewell performance singing the Nightwatchman in Die Meistersinger von Nürnberg. Other roles in his repertory included Count Almaviva in Rossini's The Barber of Seville, Max in Weber's Der Freischütz, Lionel in Flotow's Martha, and the baritone role of Beckmesser in Die Meistersinger.

He died in Utting am Ammersee shortly before his 80th birthday.
