= Invisibility in fiction =

Plot device

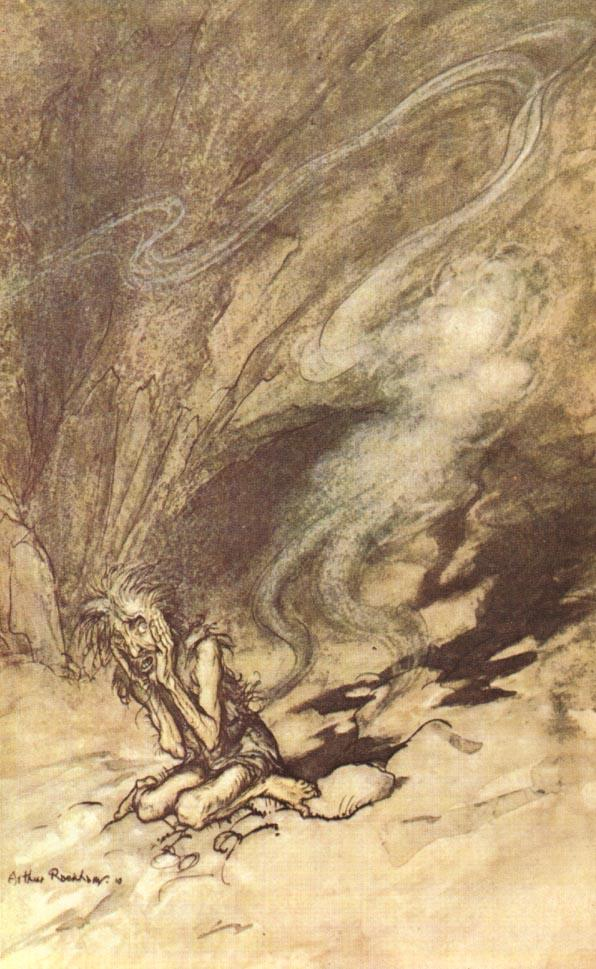
Alberich puts on the Tarnhelm and vanishes; illustration by Arthur Rackham to Richard Wagner's Das Rheingold

Invisibility in fiction is a common plot device in stories, plays, films, animated works, video games, and other media, found in both the fantasy and science fiction genres. In fantasy, invisibility is often invoked and dismissed at will by a person, with a magic spell or potion, or a cloak, ring or other object. Alternatively, invisibility may be conferred on an unsuspecting person by a sorcerer, witch, or curse. In science fiction, invisibility is often conferred on the recipient as part of a complex technological or scientific process that is difficult or impossible to reverse, so that switching back and forth at frequent intervals is less likely to be depicted in science fiction. Depending on whether the science fiction is hard science fiction or soft science fiction, the depictions of invisibility may be more rooted in actual or plausible technologies (such as depictions of technologies to make a vessel not appear on detection equipment), or more on the fictional or speculative end of the spectrum.

== Processes ==
Invisibility can be achieved by any number of different mechanisms, including perfect transparency without refraction, mechanisms that reroute light particles so that the subject is not apparent to viewers, and mind control techniques that cause the viewer's minds to simply edit out the subject. In the case of magic, often no attempt at explaining the mechanism is even used. In addition, there are many instances of imperfect invisibility such as cloaking devices in science fiction or the near-invisibility of fantastical creatures that are "out of phase" with this reality. In paranormal fiction, there can also be partial invisibility in that some people, such as psychics, may see invisible creatures or objects while others do not.

== Special effects ==
Strictly speaking, invisibility does not show up and so itself is not the subject of any special effects techniques, but the interaction of invisible subjects with the visible world does call for special effects, especially in the case of invisible people wearing visible clothing. Early films and television shows used wires and puppetry to simulate the existence of an invisible person, along with some scenes that used a matte process to delete certain elements in favor of the background. In The Invisible Man the initial shots swathed the actor's head in a black velvet hood and shot this against a black velvet background. Later, CGI techniques and green screens allowed for greater variety, such as showing rain drops on invisible man Chevy Chase in Memoirs of an Invisible Man.

== Historical examples ==
- One of the first known fictional depictions of Invisibility is the Ring of Gyges described by Plato. According to the legend, Gyges of Lydia was a shepherd in the service of King Candaules of Lydia. After an earthquake, a cave was revealed in a mountainside where Gyges was feeding his flock. Entering the cave, Gyges discovered that it was in fact a tomb with a bronze horse containing a corpse, larger than that of a man, who wore a golden ring, which Gyges pocketed. He discovered that the ring gave him the power to become invisible by adjusting it. Gyges then arranged to be chosen as one of the messengers who reported to the king as to the status of the flocks. Arriving at the palace, Gyges used his new power of invisibility to seduce the queen, and with her help he murdered the king, and became king of Lydia himself. King Croesus, famous for his wealth, was Gyges' descendant.
- In the Buddhist tradition, Maudgalyayana – one of the Sakyamuni Buddha's closest disciples – was credited with having the power to make himself invisible, and using this power to save himself from murderous robbers.
- A Cloak of invisibility appears in such a Fairy tales as The Twelve Dancing Princesses. A more common trope is the cap of invisibility. The cap of invisibility has appeared in Greek myth: Hades was ascribed possession of a cap or helmet that made the wearer invisible. In some versions of the Perseus myth, Perseus borrows this cap from the goddess Athena and uses it to sneak up on the sleeping Medusa when he kills her. The thief Autolycus, grandfather of Odysseus, had a helmet to make him invisible. A similar helmet, the Tarnhelm, is found in Norse mythology – from which it was taken into Richard Wagner's Der Ring des Nibelungen where it is used by Alberich in Das Rheingold. In the Second Branch of the Mabinogi, one of the important texts of Welsh mythology, Caswallawn (the historical Cassivellaunus) murders Caradog ap Bran and other chieftains left in charge of Britain while wearing a cloak of invisibility.
- The 14th Century Sir Launfal is provided by his fairy lover Tryamour with an invisible servant called Gyfre. Launfal then defeats the giant Valentyne, thanks to this invisible servant, who picks up his helmet and shield when Valentyne knocks them down.
- After gaining magical power through his pact with the Devil, Doctor Faustus – as depicted in Christopher Marlowe's play – travels to Rome. Armed with his new powers and attended by Mephastophilis, he goes to the Pope's court, makes himself invisible, and plays a series of tricks. He disrupts the Pope's banquet by stealing food and boxing the Pope's ears .
- According to legend the seventh century St. Aidan protected a stag from a pack of hunting dogs by miraculously turning it invisible.

== Superhero fiction ==
The supernatural ability to turn invisible has become a popular superpower in superhero media, one of the most notable users being Marvel Comics' Invisible Woman, a member of the Fantastic Four.

The power of invisibility is occasionally linked to the ability to create force fields, as seen with Invisible Woman and Disney Pixar's Violet Parr.

== Films ==
The power to become invisible through scientific methods appeared in 1900s cinema. These films were influenced in some degree by H.G. Wells novel The Invisible Man (1897). The earliest known film featuring an invisible man is Sherlock Holmes Baffled (1900). Other early examples includes Les Invisibles (1906) in which a scientist creates a concoction which makes whoever who drinks it disappear from view. Other early examples include Le voleur invisible (1909) and The Invisible Wrestler (1911). The 1908 film The Invisible Fluid by Biograph Company features a scientist who creates a fluid that a young boy takes to help steal a cash register and evade police. There are other silent films with invisible men characters derived from Wells' novel rather than fantasy-oriented narratives. The concept of invisibility has been seen in non-science fiction films usually as a temporary element, such as cloaks of invisibility in films like Fritz Lang's Die Nibelungen (1924).

Universal Pictures made Wells' novel into a film series in the early 1930s. Universal would also explore invisibility in three of their film serials: The Vanishing Shadow (1934), Flash Gordon (1936), and The Phantom Creeps (1939). In the late 1930s, Universal began making sequels to their horror films along with Joe May's The Invisible Man Returns (1940). Film critic Kim Newman described that Universal's later Invisible Man films setting how the next Invisible Man films were going to play out with characters becoming invisible through a scientific formula, all while other plot elements happen such as crime-oriented stories or spy stories. The series also added a key plot element to the majority of later "invisible man" themed films that being invisible drives the invisible person insane. This is seen in later films such as The Invisible Man Appears (1949), The Invisible Maniac (1990) and Hollow Man (2000).

Universal had made several remakes of their older horror film properties with the remake of The Mummy (1999) and The Wolfman (2010) and after the financial failure of The Mummy (2017), they had licensed their properties to the independent company Blumhouse Productions for The Invisible Man (2020).

== Television shows ==
- The Invisible Man
- Danny Phantom
- Dynamo Duck
- Fantomcat
- Gemini Man
- Mutant X
- Simon Bellamy in Misfits
- Claude in Heroes
- Ord (when he gets scared) in Dragon Tales
- Ea in Invisible Woman Ea (Japan, 1998)
- Pinky with magic power in Noozles
- Invisi-Spray in Phil of the Future
- Reloy in Stitch!
- Ben Tennyson's alien transformations Ghostfreak and Big Chill are both able to become invisible. Zs'Skayr, an Ectonurite who is Ghostfreak's genetic donor, shares this ability as well.
- Susan "Sue" Storm in Fantastic Four (1967–1970), The New Fantastic Four (1978), Fantastic Four (1994–1996), and Fantastic Four: World's Greatest Heroes.
- Castle, in the episode "Clear and Present Danger", Castle and Beckett investigate the murder of a man who was killed by an invisible man.
- The Invisible Man (cartoon series)
- Toru Hagakure, a character in My Hero Academia, has a Quirk called Invisibility that makes her entire body invisible. As a result, her hero outfit consists of solely of gloves and boots to maximize her stealth.
- Translucent in The Boys (2019)

== Literature ==
- The Wondrous Bird's Nest (1672–1675) by Hans Jakob Christoffel von Grimmelshausen
- What Was It? A Mystery (1859) by Fitz James O'Brien
- The Crystal Man (1881) by Edward Page Mitchell
- The Damned Thing (1893) by Ambrose Bierce
- The Invisible Man (1897) by H. G. Wells
- The Plattner Story (1897) by H. G. Wells
- The Secret of Wilhelm Storitz (fr.: Le Secret de Wilhelm Storitz) (written around 1897, published 1910) by Jules Verne.
- The Murderer Invisible (1931) by Philip Wylie
- The Hobbit (1937) by J. R. R. Tolkien
- The Lord of the Rings by J. R. R. Tolkien
- Koko kaupungin Vinski (1954) by Aapeli
- Danny Dean, The Invisible Boy (דנידין הילד הרואה ואינו נראה) (1961–2001), Israeli series of children's books comprising 29 volumes he:דנידין הרואה ואינו נראה
- Memoirs of an Invisible Man (1987) by H.F. Saint
- Fade (1988) by Robert Cormier
- Mina ja George (1996) by Tõnu Trubetsky
- Neverwhere (1996) by Neil Gaiman
- Thessalonica (1997) by Harry Turtledove
- Harry Potter (1997–2007) by J. K. Rowling
- The Glamour by Christopher Priest
- Invisible! (2000) by Robert Swindells
- Things Not Seen (2001) by Andrew Clements
- The Invisible Detective (2003) by Justin Richards
- The Visible Man (2011) by Chuck Klosterman
- Ring of Gyges
- Tarnhelm
- Percy Jackson & the Olympians series by Rick Riordan

== Comic books ==
- Shizuka in Translucent by Kazuhiro Okamoto.
- Martian Manhunter of DC Comics' Justice League is a Martian with shapeshifting abilities that enable him to become invisible and intangible.
- Invisible Kid of DC Comics' Legion of Super-Heroes is the name of two heroes (Lyle Norg and Jacques Foccart), with both deriving invisibility from a special serum.
- Calvin of Calvin and Hobbes imagines himself to turn invisible.
- Doraemon and his 'invisibility cloak' gadget.
- Näkymätön Viänänen by Jorma "Jope" Pitkänen

== Video games ==
- Optic Camo soldiers, Fennek Stealth scouts and Akula MBTs in Act of War: Direct Action and High Treason
- Several Brotherhood of Nod units, such as Stealth tank, Vertigo bomber, and Nod harvester in Command & Conquer 3: Tiberium Wars
- The Nanosuit in the Crysis series allows the player to have active camouflage hence being invisible.
- In Deus Ex, the player is able to activate an invisibility cloak, which is effective against human NPCs. There is also a cloak which diverts microwaves, rendering the player invisible to cameras, automated turrets and bots.
- In The Elder Scrolls IV: Oblivion, a player can enchant multiple objects with a percentage of invisibility which creates 100% invisibility when worn. When combined with 100% stealth, this renders the player completely unable to be seen or heard by enemies. Enchanted invisibility is distinctly different from chameleon which only allows limited camouflage.
- The Chinese Stealth Suit of Fallout 3 allows the player to turn invisible whilst crouching. Stealth Boys offer the same effect.
- Active Camouflage power in the Halo series
- Nova, Samuro, Valeera, and Zeratul are playable characters with baseline stealth ability in Heroes of the Storm
- In Lego Jurassic World, the Indominus rex can become completely invisible whilst Owen Grady can use an invisibility cloak to become invisible (actually transparent and merely hidden to the Indominus' eyesight).
- Stealth Camo in the series Metal Gear Solid
- Smoke and Reptile possess a special move to turn invisible in the Mortal Kombat series
- Sombra in Overwatch
- Potion and Boo's Sheet powerup in Paper Mario: The Thousand-Year Door
- Predator Cloaking Device in Predator and AVP video games
- Rain features an invisible world revealed by the rain.
- Ghosts, Wraiths, Observers, Dark Templar, and Infested Kerrigan/Duran in StarCraft
- Vanish Cap powerup in Super Mario 64
- Luigi turns invisible with Flower Power in Super Mario 64 DS
- Cloaking device powerup in Perfect Dark
- Spy cloak in Team Fortress and Team Fortress 2
- In Tom Clancy's Ghost Recon: Future Soldier the player activates the cloak automatically by crouching, if the player gets too close to an enemy. He will be compromised.

== Miscellaneous ==
- Dungeons & Dragons and many other role-playing games use several methods of invisibility, including magic potions, spells or devices.

== Metaphorical use of the concept ==
- As detailed in disambiguation page "The Invisible Man", this has been the title of numerous works. Some of them deal with the fictional depiction of literal invisibility, while others use the title metaphorically in reference to members of discriminated or marginalized groups in society.
- Fictional depictions of the phenomena of "invisible women" due ageism and a societal focus on youth culture show women becoming socially "invisible" after a certain age (e.g., older than the late 40s or the 50s). In some novels and short stories, women at or beyond these age categories may get less invitations to social activities, dates, and events. In Whitney Otto's novel Now You See Her, an older woman who works in an office becomes more and more "invisible" to her coworkers.

== See also ==
- Category:Fictional characters who can turn invisible
