= The Invisible Man (disambiguation) =

The Invisible Man is an 1897 novel by H. G. Wells.

The Invisible Man or Invisible Men or variation, may also refer to:

- Invisible person, a science fiction concept

== Literature ==
- Griffin (The Invisible Man), the title character in Wells' novel
- Invisible Man, a 1952 novel by Ralph Ellison
- "The Invisible Man", a short story by G. K. Chesterton
- The invisible man : the life and liberties of H.G. Wells a biography of Wells by Michael Coren
- A Láthatatlan Ember (The Invisible Man) or Slave of the Huns, a 1901 Hungarian novel by Géza Gárdonyi

== Film ==
- The Invisible Man (1933 film), a 1933 film based on the original story starring Claude Rains
- The Invisible Man Returns, a 1940 film starring Vincent Price
- The Invisible Man's Revenge, a 1944 film
- The Invisible Man Appears, a 1949 film loosely based on the original story
- Abbott and Costello Meet the Invisible Man, a 1951 film starring Bud Abbott and Lou Costello
- Invisible Man (1954 film), A Japanese adaptation directed by Motoyoshi Oda and produced by Toho
- The Invisible Man vs. The Human Fly, a 1957 film loosely based on the original story
- The Invisible Man (1984 film), a Soviet film adaptation
- The Invisible Man (2020 film), a modern adaptation of both the novel by H. G. Wells and the 1933 film of the same name

== Television ==
=== Episodes ===
- "Invisible Man", Inspector Chingum season 1, episode 7 (2019)
- "Invisible Man", Married season 1, episode 6 (2014)
- "Invisible Man", The Bill series 25, episode 64, part one of On the Streets (1999)
- "Invisible Man", Winning Time: The Rise of the Lakers Dynasty season 1, episode 7 (2022)
- "The Invisible Man", Father Brown series 3, episode 3 (2015)
- "The Invisible Man", Frontline season 1, episode 9 (1994)
- "The Invisible Man", Joe's Life episode 6 (1993)
- "The Invisible Man", Knots Landing season 14, episode 10 (1993)
- "The Invisible Man", NBC Matinee Theater season 2, episode 207 (1957)
- "The Invisible Man", Packed to the Rafters season 3, episode 5 (2010)
- "The Invisible Man", Providence season 3, episode 14 (2001)
- "The Invisible Man", Sneaky Pete season 3, episode 5 (2019)
- "The Invisible Man", Tales of the Wizard of Oz episode 64 (1961)
- "The Invisible Man", The Army Game series 3, episode 15 (1960)
- "The Invisible Man", The Best Man: The Final Chapters episode 4 (2022)
- "The Invisible Man", The Champions episode 2 (1968)

=== Shows ===
- The Invisible Man (1958 TV series), a British television series loosely based on the original story
- The Invisible Man (1975 TV series), a short-lived American television series starring David McCallum
- The Invisible Man (1984 TV series), a 1984 BBC adaptation of the original novel
- The Invisible Man (2000 TV series), a Sci-Fi Channel series
- The Invisible Man (2005 TV series), a French animated series
- The Invisible Man (game show), a Russian game show

== Music ==
- The Invisible Man (album), a 2001 album by Mark Eitzel
- The Invisible Man, the English name of Michael Cretu's 1985 album Die Chinesische Mauer
- "The Invisible Man" (song), a 1989 song by Queen
- "The Invisible Man", a song by Elvis Costello and the Attractions from the 1983 album Punch the Clock
- "The Invisible Man", a song by Marillion from the 2004 album Marbles
- "The Invisible Man", a 1984 single by The Trudy
- "Invisible Man" (song), a 1997 song by 98 Degrees
- "Invisible Man", a song by The Breeders from the 1993 album Last Splash
- "Invisible Man", a song by Theory of a Deadman from the 2002 album Theory of Deadman
- "Invisible Man", a song by The Third Rail (band) from the 1967 album Id Music
- The Invisible Men, songwriting and producer trio of Jason Pebworth, George Astasio and Jon Shave
- Invisible Men, a 1983 album by Anthony Phillips

== Other uses ==
- The Invisible Man (painting), a 1933 oil on canvas work by Salvador Dalí
- "The Invisible Man", season 3, episode 8 (2014) of the American comedy Web series Talking Marriage with Ryan Bailey

== See also ==
- Invisible Woman (disambiguation)
- Invisible Girl (disambiguation)
- Invisible Boy (disambiguation)
- Invisible Kid (disambiguation)
- Memoirs of an Invisible Man, a science-fiction novel by H. F. Saint, and its 1992 film adaptation
- Seven Invisible Men (2005 film), Lithuanian drama film
- Hollow Man, a film based on the concept of an invisible man
- Adrishyam: The Invisible Heroes, an Indian Hindi-language web-series
