= The Invisible Man (film series) =

American film series

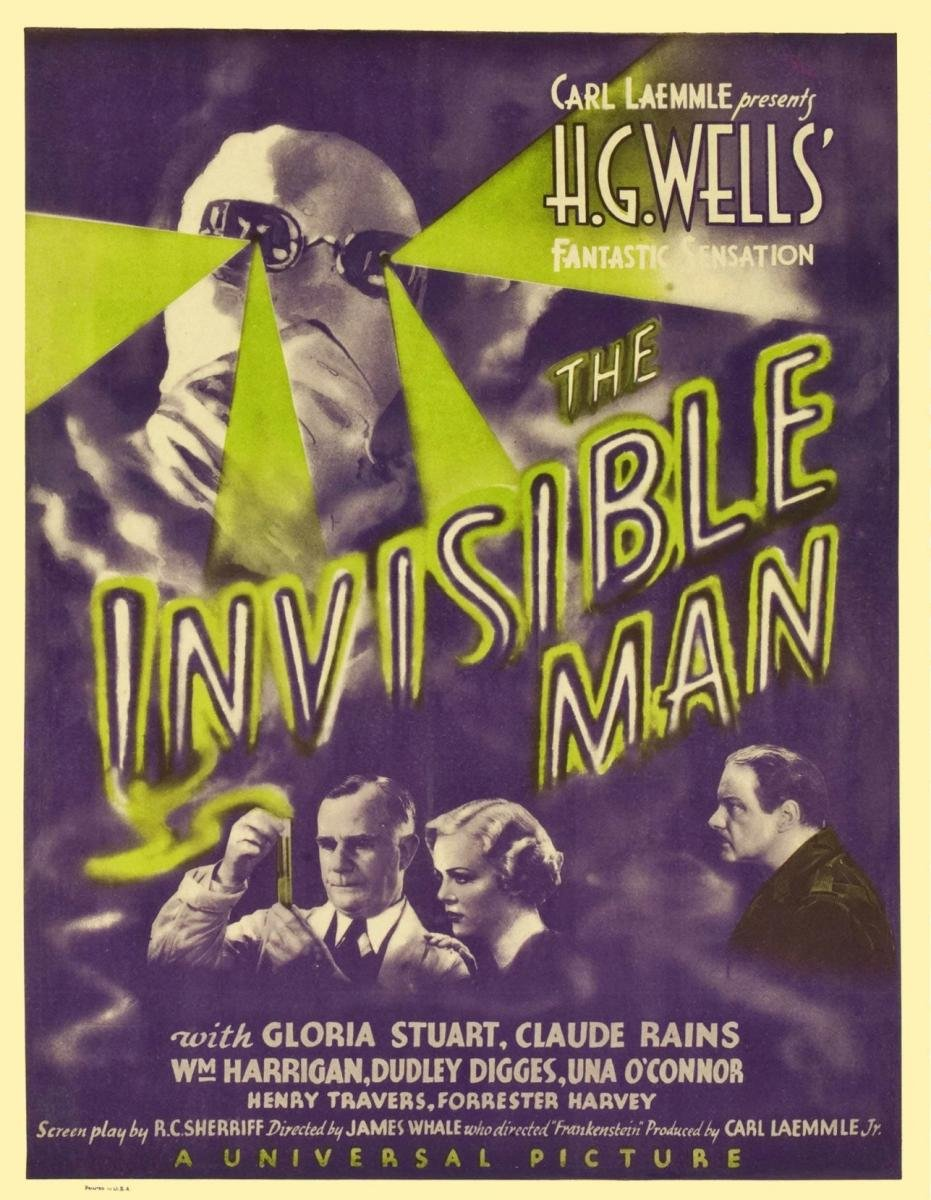
- Original work: The Invisible Man by H. G. Wells

Films and television
- Film(s): The Invisible Man; The Invisible Man Returns; The Invisible Woman; Invisible Agent; The Invisible Man's Revenge; Abbott and Costello Meet the Invisible Man

The Invisible Man is a film series by Universal Pictures. The series consists of The Invisible Man (1933), The Invisible Man Returns (1940), The Invisible Woman (1940), Invisible Agent (1942), The Invisible Man's Revenge (1944) and Abbott and Costello Meet the Invisible Man (1951). The film series borrows elements from H. G. Wells's novel The Invisible Man (1897), but it focuses primarily on the idea of a serum that causes someone to go invisible and its side-effects.

The series has been described as fragmented, with very few films in the series being connected. This is different from other Universal series of the time, such as Frankenstein and The Mummy. Some films in the Invisible Man series, such as The Invisible Man Returns and Invisible Agent, attempt to connect to the first film through characters who were related to Griffin. Others bear no relation to the original film beyond the inclusion of a plot involving a mad scientist and a person who becomes invisible as a result of their experiments. Retrospective critics and film historians have commented that other films in the series borrow stories from previous films, with The Invisible Man Returns, The Invisible Man's Revenge and Abbott and Costello Meet the Invisible Man having the same stories as Charlie Chan in London (1934), The Walking Dead (1936) and The Invisible Man's Revenge respectively.

From retrospective critiques, writers and authors such as Donald F. Glut and William K. Everson found the original 1933 film to be the highlight of the series, while the other films varied in overall quality. The Invisible Man Returns, The Invisible Woman and Invisible Agent all received Academy Award nominations for Best Special Effects. Various television series and films would follow featuring Invisible Man-styled characters, with the series establishing that the Invisible Man would often be driven to insanity due to his invisibility, a new trait in the series that would be applied to later films such as The Invisible Man Appears (1949), The Invisible Maniac (1990) and Hollow Man (2000).

== Films ==
Universal's The Invisible Man film series includes The Invisible Man (1933), The Invisible Man Returns (1940), The Invisible Woman (1940), Invisible Agent (1942), The Invisible Man's Revenge (1944) and Abbott and Costello Meet the Invisible Man (1951). Film historian Ken Hanke described The Invisible Man franchise as one of Universal's "most fragmented series". The authors of Universal Horror wrote that attempts to connect the series to the first film "proved awkward" unlike Universal's The Mummy and Frankenstein series. Critic Kim Newman echoed this, saying that the Invisible Man sequels were not really sequels or reboots of the first film. Examples of these connections include The Invisible Man Returns where the character Geoffrey Radcliffe (Vincent Price) receives the invisibility formula from Dr. Frank Griffin (John Sutton), a relative of Jack Griffin, and Invisible Spy where Frank Raymond is Griffin's grandson. In The Invisible Man's Revenge, the screenplay does not connect Robert Griffin with the previous Griffins who either created, understood and or operated with the invisibility formula.

Some installments were described as being rewrites of previous entries or other films entirely. Hanke described The Invisible Man Returns's story being "more than slightly similar" to Charlie Chan in London (1934). In Phil Hardy's book Science Fiction, a review stated that the Invisible Man's Revenge was basically a rewrite of The Walking Dead (1936). Abbott and Costello was described by the authors of Universal Horrors as being a semi-remake of Returns with the title character rewritten as a boxer framed for murder. Hanke described The Invisible Woman as being "curious offshoot" of the series, being directed by A. Edward Sutherland, who specialized in comedy films.

=== The Invisible Man ===
Dr. Jack Griffin who is covered in bandages and has his eyes obscured by dark glasses, the result of a secret experiment that makes him invisible, taking lodging in a small village until his landlady discovers he is invisible. Griffin returns to the laboratory of his mentor, Dr. Cranley who soon learns that Griffin's discovery has driven him insane, leading him to prove his superiority over other people by performing harmless pranks at first and eventually turning to murder.

=== The Invisible Man Returns ===
Geoffrey Radcliffe is condemned for a murder he did not commit by the colliery owner Richard Cobb. Radcliffe requests doctor Frank Griffin to inject him with the invisibility formula, even Griffin warns him it could drive him mad. Radcliffe is able to expose Cobb without succumbing to insanity or murder.

=== The Invisible Woman ===
Wealthy lawyer Richard Russell funds inventor Professor Gibbs creation of an invisibility machine. They test it first on Kitty Carroll, a department store model who uses her new power to get revenge former boss, Mr. Growley who fired her, all while gangsters are out to steal the invisibility machine.

=== Invisible Agent ===
Frank "Raymond" Griffin, a younger relative of the inventor of the original invisibility formula is sent to attack the Nazis. Raymond uses the invisibility formula and with the help of Maria Sorensen who may or may not be in league with . When Nazi agents try to coerce the secret formula out of Raymond, he eludes them by becoming transparent himself.

=== The Invisible Man's Revenge ===
Dr. Peter Drury tests his new formula for invisibility on the escaped fugitive Robert Griffin. After taking it, Griffin seizes the opportunity to head to London to take revenge on the Herrick family, who he believes have abandoned him on an African safari.

=== Abbott and Costello Meet the Invisible Man ===
Bud Alexander and Lou Francis are private-eyes and meet champion boxer Tommy Nelson, who is wanted for the murder of his manager. With the help of Dr. Philip Gray, the detectives use a new invisibility serum to try clear his name.

== Production ==
Following the success of Dracula (1931), Richard L. Schayer and Robert Florey suggested to Universal Pictures that an adaptation of H.G. Wells's The Invisible Man as early as 1931. Though promoted as being based on H.G. Wells' novel The Invisible Man, the screenplay only follows the basics of the original novel. After going through several potential directors, including Florey, Cyril Gardner, E. A. Dupont, with James Whale eventually being chosen. Shooting of the film began in June 1933 and concluded in late August.

Universal Pictures first announced the development of The Invisible Man Returns in March 1939, around the time Son of Frankenstein (1939) was performing well at the box office. Hanke described the film's story being "more than slightly similar" to the 1934 film Charlie Chan in London. Though not a horror film, The Invisible Woman was originally written as a more serious horror film, about a mad scientist turning a woman invisible. The story was then passed on to Robert Lees and Fred Naldo who specialized in comedy. Gertrude Purcell, who had written the screenplay for the western comedy Destry Rides Again (1939) was hired to add a woman's perspective on the story.

Invisible Agent was announced under the title The Invisible Spy in early 1942. Actor Jon Hall who was Frank "Raymond" Griffin in Invisible Agent now portrays Robert Griffin, a killer who seeks revenge on men who framed him. A retrospective review in Phil Hardy's book Science Fiction commented that the film was basically a rewrite of the 1936 film The Walking Dead.

Universal first announced the plan for The Invisible Man's Revenge on June 10, 1943, with the hopes of having Claude Rains performing in the lead. Prior to the first day of shooting The Invisible Man's Revenge, Universal's attorneys made a deal with H. G. Wells for the rights to make two more Invisible Man sequels between July 1943 and October 1951. Abbott and Costello Meet the Invisible Man was described by the authors of Universal Horrors as being a semi-remake of The Invisible Man Returns with the title character rewritten as a boxer framed for murder. Several lines of dialog from The Invisible Man Returns and some special effects were reused in the film.

== Crew ==
Crew
Crew	The Invisible Man	The Invisible Man Returns	The Invisible Woman	Invisible Agent	The Invisible Man's Revenge	Abbott and Costello Meet the Invisible Man	Ref(s)
Director	James Whale	Joe May	A. Edward Sutherland	Edwin L. Marin	Ford Beebe	Charles Lamont	
Producers	Carl Laemmle, Jr.	—N/a	—N/a	—N/a	Ford Beebe	Howard Christie	
Screenwriters	R.C. Sherriff	Curt Siodmak; Lester K. Cole	Robert Lees; Gertrude Purcell; Frederic I. Rinaldo	Curt Siodmak	Bertram Millhauser	John Grant; Robert Lees; Frederic I. Rinaldo	
Cinematographer	Arthur Edeson	Milton Krasner	Elwood Bredell	Les White	Milton Krasner	George Robinson	
Editors	Ted Kent	Frank Gross	Frank Gross	Edward Curtiss	Saul A. Goodkind	Virgil Vogel	
Visual Effects Supervisor	Frank D. Williams	John P. Fulton	John Hall; John P. Fulton	John P. Fulton	John P. Fulton	David S. Horsley	

== Reception ==
In his book Classic Movie Monsters (1978), Donald F. Glut referred to the original as a classic, while finding the series in the 1940s were more in the line of b films or programmers that were still "all entraining thrillers" specifically those with special effects by John P. Fulton. William K. Everson discussed the series in his book More Classics of the Horror Film (1986) finding the first two films as "relatively tame today in terms of shock and sensation, but dramatically and pictorially they survive rather well", the Invisible Agent as having the best single shot in the series where the invisible man portrayed by Jon Hall slowly having water sprinkle on his face as sinister expression is revealed, while The Invisible Man's Revenge, was the least menacing feature of all of the films. James L. Neibaur discussed the series in his book The Monster Movies of Universal Studios (2017), stating that outside the 1933 film The Invisible Man, "none of its sequels were particularly impressive" finding The Invisible Man's Revenge "average", The Invisible Woman "amusing" and Invisible Agent benefitting from the appearance of Peter Lorre in the cast, and The Invisible Man's Revenge "pedestrian". Peter Hutchings responded to the negative retrospective reception of 1940s Universal horror product, saying "is often intertwined with a prejudice against the sequel itself as a particular cinematic format, with the sequelisation process seeming to mark the moment where innovation ends and exploitation begins."

Three films in the series led to Academy Award nominations for Best Special Effects. These included Fulton, Bernard B. Brown and William Hedgcock for The Invisible Man Returns, Fulton and John Hall for The Invisible Woman, and Fulton and Brown for Invisible Agent.

== Legacy ==
Unlike other Universal properties, The Invisible Man did not receive any remakes from companies such as Hammer Film Productions. In Japan, Daiei Film made their own Invisible Man films. The first was The Invisible Man Appears (1949), one of Japan's first science fiction films. The film resembles The Invisible Man's Revenge as its plot revolves around using the Invisible Man for a heist. Special effects involving the invisible man unravelling himself from bandages and objects moving themselves across the rooms were described by Newman as being "lifted" from the 1933 film. Daiei Film generally did not make many science fiction films until the 1950s with Warning from Space (1956) and another Invisible Man themed film with The Invisible Man vs. The Human Fly (1957). Universal's film series added a key plot element of invisibility driving the invisible person insane that would be in many of the later Invisible Man-themed films. This is seen in films such as The Invisible Man Appears (1949), The Invisible Maniac (1990) and Hollow Man (2000).

Television series were later developed such as a 1958 British series The Invisible Man which featured a bandaged clad character named Peter Brady who fought crime and sought a cure for his own invisibility. The Invisible Man and Gemini Man were made in the 1970s which were more oriented towards spy fiction, borrowing Invisible Agent's style of the Invisible Man as a patriotic hero.

A remake entered development as of February 2016, when Johnny Depp was announced to star with Ed Solomon writing the script, and Alex Kurtzman and Chris Morgan producing. Kurtzman and Morgan moved on to other projects the following November. In 2019, Universal announced and began production on the remake, written and directed by Leigh Whannell and produced by Jason Blum under his Blumhouse Productions banner. It featured Oliver Jackson-Cohen as the titular character.

When a trailer was released that December, Robert Moran of The Sydney Morning Herald commented that it was "met with the kind of confusion that could rattle a filmmaker, not to mention a studio. It seems monster movie fans, long-attuned to the bandage-wrapped antics of The Invisible Man of yore, weren't expecting Whannell's allegory on domestic violence trauma". Whannell commented on his change from the norm on the style, explaining that he knew there was going to be some backlash as he was "modernizing it and centering it not around the Invisible Man but his victim". Whannel compared his Invisible Man to the popular image of the character: "The iconic image of the Invisible Man is one of a floating pair of sunglasses, you know? I knew I had to move it away from that". The Invisible Man was released on February 28, 2020.

== See also ==
- Invisibility in fiction
- Dracula (Universal film series)
- The Wolf Man (franchise)
