= Cap of invisibility =

Object in classical mythology

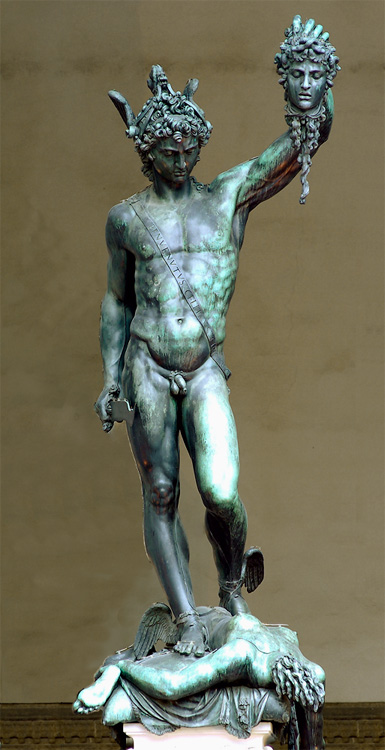
Cellini's Perseus (1545–54), wearing the Cap of Invisibility and carrying the head of Medusa

In classical mythology, the Cap of Invisibility (Ἅϊδος κυνέη (H)aïdos kyneē in Greek, lit. dog-skin of Hades) is a helmet or cap that can turn the wearer invisible, also known as the Cap of Hades or Helm of Hades. Wearers of the cap in Greek myths include Athena, the goddess of wisdom, the messenger god Hermes, and the hero Perseus. Those wearing the Cap become invisible to other supernatural entities, akin to a cloud of mist sometimes used to remain undetectable.

== Origins ==
One ancient source that attributes a special helmet to the ruler of the underworld is the Bibliotheca (2nd/1st century BC), in which the Uranian Cyclopes give Zeus the lightning bolt, Poseidon the trident, and a helmet (kyneê) to Hades (or Pluto) in their war against the Titans.

In classical mythology the helmet is regularly said to belong to the god of the underworld. Rabelais calls it the Helmet of Pluto, and Erasmus the Helmet of Orcus. The helmet becomes proverbial for those who conceal their true nature by a cunning device: "the helmet of Pluto, which maketh the politic man go invisible, is secrecy in the counsel, and celerity in the execution."

== Users ==
=== Hades ===
As the name implies, Hades owned the helmet. It was forged for him by Elder Cyclopes after he and his brothers Zeus and Poseidon freed them from Tartarus. He then used this helmet to great effect during the Titanomachy and was instrumental in routing the Titans.

=== Athena ===
Athena, the goddess of wisdom, battle, and handicrafts, wore the Cap of Invisibility in one instance during the Trojan War. She used it to become invisible to Ares when she aided Diomedes, his enemy. Her assistance even enabled Diomedes to injure the god of war with a spear.

=== Hermes ===
The messenger god Hermes wore the Cap during his battle with Hippolytus, the giant.

=== Perseus ===
In some stories, Perseus received the Cap of Invisibility (along with the Winged Sandals) from Athena when he went to slay the Gorgon Medusa, which helped him escape her sisters. In other myths, however, Perseus obtained these items from the Stygian nymphs. The Cap of Invisibility was not used to avoid the Gorgons' petrifying gazes, but rather to escape from the immortal Stheno and Euryale later on after he had decapitated Medusa.

== See also ==
- Bident – another mystical object associated with Hades
- Cloak of invisibility
- Cloaking device
- Mambrino – a fictional Moorish king who possessed a golden helmet that would make the wearer invulnerable
- Ring of Gyges
- Tarnhelm
