= Invisible Boy =

Invisible Boy or variant, may refer to:

- Invisible person, a SF concept
- The Invisible Boy (a.k.a. S.O.S Spaceship), a 1957 U.S. science fiction film
- The Invisible Boy (2014 film), an Italian superhero film
- Boy (The Invisibles), alter-ego of Lucille Butler, a DC Comics character created by Grant Morrison, see List of The Invisibles characters
- Danny Dunn, Invisible Boy (a.k.a. Invisible Boy) a 1974 juvenile science fiction adventure novel by Raymond Abrashkin and Jay Williams
- Invisible Boy (short story), a 1945 short story by Ray Bradbury, collected in the 1953 Bradbury anthology The Golden Apples of the Sun

== See also ==
- The Invisible Man (disambiguation)
- Invisible Girl (disambiguation)
- The Last Invisible Boy, 2008 children's novel by Evan Kuhlman
