= Quantitative Invisibility =

In computer-aided design (CAD)/CAM, quantitative invisibility (QI) is the number of solid bodies that obscure a point in space as projected onto a plane. Often, CAD engineers project a model into a plane (a 2D drawing) in order to denote edges that are visible with a solid line, and those that are hidden with dashed or dimmed lines.

== Algorithm ==
Tracking the number of obscuring bodies gave rise to an algorithm that propagates the quantitative invisibility throughout the model. This technique uses edge coherence to speed calculations in the algorithm. However, QI really only works well when bodies are larger solids, non-interpenetrating, and not transparent.

A technique like this falls apart when applied to soft organic tissue as found in the human body, because there is not always a clear delineation of structures. Also, when images become too cluttered and intertwined, the contribution of this algorithm is marginal. Arthur Appel of the graphics group at IBM Watson Research coined the term quantitative invisibility and used it in several of his papers.
