= Illusion optics =

Illusion optics is an electromagnetic theory that can change the optical appearance of an object to be exactly like that of another virtual object, i.e. an illusion, such as turning the look of an apple into that of a banana. Invisibility is a special case of illusion optics, which turns objects into illusions of free space. The concept and numerical proof of illusion optics was proposed in 2009 based on transformation optics in the field of metamaterials. It is a scientific disproof of the idiom 'Seeing is Believing'.

Illusion optics proves that the optical responses or properties of a space containing any objects can be changed to be exactly those of a virtual space but containing arbitrary virtual objects (illusions) by using a passive illusion optics device composed of materials or metamaterials with specific parameters and shape. For example, a dielectric spoon was numerically shown to exhibit the scattering properties of a metallic cup by using an illusion optics device in the seminal paper. Such illusion effects do not rely on the direction and form of incident waves. However, due to dispersion limitation of specific material parameters, the functionality of illusion optics device only works in a narrow band of frequency.

== Difference with optical illusions ==
Unlike optical illusions that utilize the misinterpretation of the human brain to create illusionary perception different from the physical measurement, illusion optics changes the optical response or properties of objects. Illusion optic devices make these changes happen. Although both these terms deal with illusions, Illusion optics deal with the refraction and reflection of light, whereas while optical illusions are basically mind tricks.

== History ==
Illusion optics was recorded in 1968 when Soviet physicist Victor Veselago discovered that he can make objects appear in different areas through negatively refracting flat slab. When light is negatively refracted, the light is directed towards the direction it entered and deflected away from the line of refraction. Normal refraction occurs when light passes through the line of refraction. Veselago used this theory to work the slab into a lens, which he recorded in his experiments. He discovered that unlike a normal lens, the objects resolution does not depend on the limits of the wavelengths passing through the lens. Veselago's work has been more prominent in recent years due to the advancement in metamaterials, which are engineered materials that have special internal physical properties and have the ability to negatively refract light.

== Devices ==
An illusion device is how illusion optics works—without a device there is no way to define how light is refracted and deflected. Based on a study on circular objects with illusion optic properties, (i.e. negative refraction indexes) there are three basics of an illusion device: the invisibility cloak, real object, and illusion object. The invisibility cloak is basically the medium on which light waves refract. Invisibility cloaks allow for an object to be undetected while confined in the area of the cloak. In other words, the viewer does not see the real object. In illusion optics, devices are not limited to only invisibility cloaks. For example, in Veselago's experiments, and lens was used to steer eyes away from the real object and direct them towards the illusion object. The real object refers to any object that is being refracted upon. In this case, while the real object is under the invisibility cloak, light waves are directed around it so the viewer only sees past the cloak. In Veselago's experiments, the real object is being refracted so the viewer sees a mirrored view of it. The illusion object is how the light waves come together and produces what the viewer sees as “normal.” The invisibility cloak refracts the reflected background light around the object and directs it into the viewer. The viewer only perceives there to be a background. With Veselago's experiments, the illusion object is displayed, but is only an image and is not the real object.

== Metamaterials ==
Artificial metamaterials are important to how illusion optic devices are created. The properties of these materials allow it to bend light waves negatively, so as to have negative permittivity and negative permeability. There are two pieces of metamaterials which hold different properties: the complementary medium and the restoring medium. The complementary medium is the illusion media used to scatter wavelengths away from the object that is being refracted. The restoring medium focuses waves and directs scattered waves together. Transformation optics is an important to creating metamaterials. The intermolecular geometry used in this field is crucial to creating the material properties.
