= Invisible Woman (disambiguation) =

Invisible Woman is a fictional character that appears in comic books published by Marvel Comics.

Invisible Woman or The Invisible Woman may also refer to:

== Film ==
- The Invisible Woman (1933 film), a 1933 French comedy film
- The Invisible Woman (1940 film), a 1940 science fiction comedy film
- The Invisible Woman (1969 film), a 1969 drama film
- The Invisible Woman (1983 film), a 1983 science fiction comedy television film
- The Invisible Woman (2013 film), a 2013 drama film

== Literature ==
- The Invisible Woman, a 1924 novel by Herbert Quick
- Invisible Woman, a 1982 collection of poems by Joyce Carol Oates
- The Invisible Woman, a 1990 book by Claire Tomalin
- Daheim unterwegs (known as Invisible Woman in English), the 1998 autobiography of Ika Hügel-Marshall
- An Invisible Woman, a 2004 novel by Anne Strieber
- Invisible Women: Forgotten Artists of Florence, a 2009 book by Jane Fortune
- Invisible Women: Exposing Data Bias in a World Designed for Men, a 2019 book by Caroline Criado Perez

== Television ==
=== Episodes ===
- "Invisible Woman", a 2005 episode of Doctors (2000 TV series)
- "The Invisible Woman", a 2002 episode of Six Feet Under
- "The Invisible Woman", a 2002 episode of The Invisible Man (2000 TV series)
- "The Invisible Woman", a 2020 episode of Bull (2016 TV series)

=== Shows ===
- A Mulher Invisível, a Brazilian Emmy-winning comedy series

== Other uses ==
- Invisible Woman (Marvel Rivals), a Marvel Rivals character based on the Marvel Comics character of the same name

== See also ==
- Invisible Girl (disambiguation)
- The Invisible Man (disambiguation)
