= Näkymätön Viänänen =

Comic

Näkymätön Viänänen (Savonian dialect Finnish for "The invisible Väänänen") is a Finnish comic strip drawn by Jorma "Jope" Pitkänen. Pitkänen has been drawing the strip since 1973 and the strip is still active.

The main character is Viänänen (a Savonian version of the common Finnish surname Väänänen), who is invisible. Only his trademark cap can be seen, but he is also often holding a bottle of beer in the process of drinking from it. The reason for Viänänen's invisibility has never been explained, and it seems to be used only for comical effect - the plot of the strip ignores Viänänen's invisibility completely.

Viänänen lives in a cottage somewhere in the deep countryside of Savonia, together with his wife Lempi, their infant son, and various farm animals. The whole family, including the animals, speak Finnish in the Savonian dialect. The plot of the strip usually touches on Finnish politics - Viänänen is a right-wing supporter of agrarians' rights, and is sympathetic with the True Finns party, and his political views often clash with the decisions of the Finnish government, and the European Union. Viänänen also sometimes gets in trouble with the police, because of his habit of making moonshine on his farm, which is illegal under Finnish law.
