= Invisible Girl =

Invisible Girl or The Invisible Girls or variant, may refer to:

== Music ==
- "Invisible Girl", a song on the 2010 Gabriella Cilmi album Ten
- Invisible Girl (album), the 2009 album by The King Khan & BBQ Show, or the title song
- The Invisible Girls, a 1970s British rock band

== Other uses ==
- Invisible Girl (novel), 2020 thriller novel by Lisa Jewell
- The Invisible Girl (film), a 2022 thriller drama film
- "The Invisible Girl" (story), a short story by Mary Shelley published in The Keepsake for 1830
- Invisible person, a science fiction concept
- Invisible Woman, a fictional character that appears in comic books published by Marvel Comics, whose original name was Invisible Girl
- Toru Hagakure or Invisible Girl, a fictional character in the manga My Hero Academia

== See also ==
- Invisible Woman (disambiguation)
- Invisible Boy (disambiguation)
