= Ortnit =

13th-century Middle High German epic poem

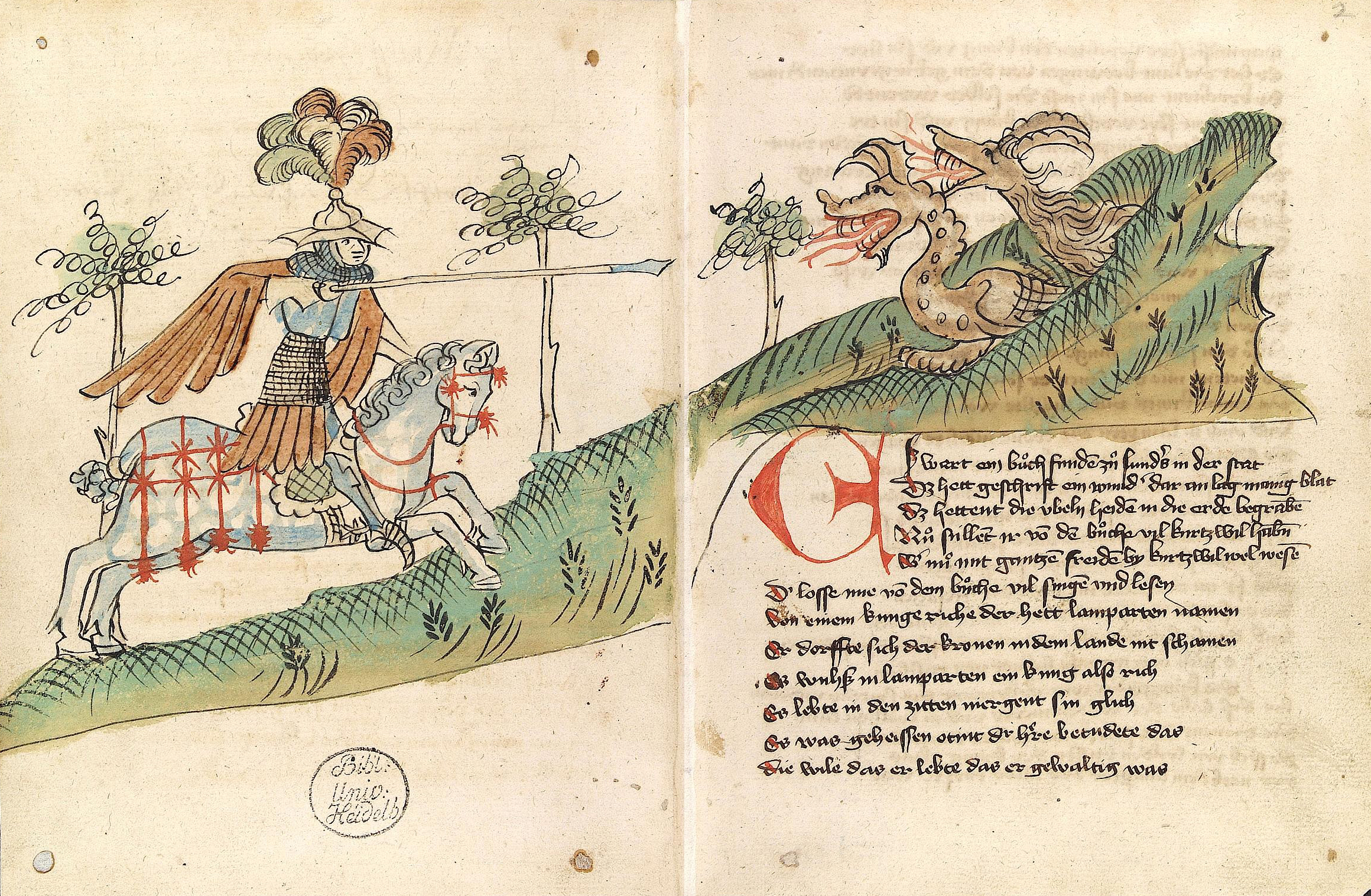
- Ortnit attacking the dragons on the first page of Ortnit. From Heidelberg, Universitätsbiblothek, Cpg 365, folios 1v and 2r.
- Full title: Ortnit
- Language: Middle High German
- Date: Various versions c. 1230–1590
- Provenance: Germany
- Manuscript(s): Two distinct versions preserved in 11 MSS; another version preserved in two fragments
- First printed edition: in the Strassburg Heldenbuch (Johann Prüss, 1479)
- Genre: Heroic epic
- Verse form: Hildebrandston; later, Heunenweise
- Length: c. 450–600 strophes
- Sources: Oral tradition

Ortnit or Otnit is a Middle High German heroic epic about the eponymous king Ortnit. First written down in strophic form around 1230 by an anonymous author, it circulated in a number of distinct versions.

In the earliest version, King Ortnit sets out on an expedition to make the daughter of the heathen King Machorel his bride. He is greatly assisted by the cunning of the dwarf Alberich, who can only be seen by the wearer of a magic ring, and by the martial prowess of the Russian king Ilyas, Ortnit's uncle. In the second part of the story, Machorel, enraged by Ortnit's abduction of his daughter, sends him, in a feigned gesture of reconciliation, two dragon eggs. When these hatch, the dragons terrorise the land. After a year's delay, Ortnit sets out to kill the dragons, but falls asleep and is killed by them.

In most of the surviving versions, this is followed by the story of Wolfdietrich, who avenges Ortnit's death and marries his widow. Though the two stories have distinct origins, they were possibly combined and integrated at an early stage. The earliest surviving versions, Ortnit A and Wolfdietrich A may be the work of a single author.

The bride-quest and dragon motifs come from older oral traditions, but a strong crusading element in the journey to the Levant and defeat of a heathen army reflects the concerns of the 13th century. There is no consensus about the origins of the figure of Ortnit himself.

With a dozen manuscripts, six printed editions and a theatrical adaptation, the story remained popular right up until the early 17th century.

== Versions ==
The story of Ortnit survives in eight narrative versions, grouped in four main traditions:

Ortnit A (also Ortnit AW, after the two manuscripts) is the oldest version, written around 1230, containing 597 strophes. A later adaptation in the Dresden Heldenbuch condenses the text to about a third of the length.

Ortnit C survives only in two fragments containing around 60 strophes of Ortnit with material close to that of Ortnit A.

Ortnit D, written around 1300, combines material from version C and a further, unknown version. Version D survives in four different variants from the 15th and 16th centuries:

- a 560 strophes, five manuscripts
- e 497 strophes, four manuscripts, including the manuscript version of the Strassburg Heldenbuch
- y 443 strophes, one manuscript
- z 555 strophes, the six printed editions of the Strassburg Heldenbuch.

A verse drama in rhyming couplets by Jakob Ayrer published in 1618, Vom dem keiser Ottnit, was er biss and sein Endt erstritten und ausgericht, auff das Getreulichst der Histori nach is based on Ortnit D.

Wolfdietrich B is not accompanied by a separate Ortnit tale. Instead, the stories are integrated: Wolfdietrich meets Ortnit, defeats him in battle and gains his friendship; Ortnit later kills two giants and a dragon but is then killed in his sleep by a second dragon.

== The story ==
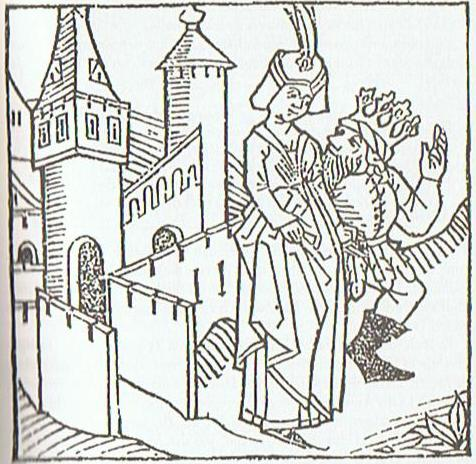
Alberich seduces the Lombard queen. Woodcut from the printed Heldenbuch, c. 1480.

=== Ortnit A ===
I. (Strophes 1–69) In his castle at Garda, King Ortnit of Lambarten (Lombardy) tells his vassals that he means to seek a wife, and one of them, his uncle Ilyas, King of Russia, mentions the beautiful daughter of Machorel of Muntabur (Mount Tabor), a heathen king. In spite of the fact that Machorel kills any suitor for his daughter, intending to marry her himself once his wife is dead, Ortnit sets his heart on her.

II. (70–212) Delayed from setting out by winter weather, he is given a ring by his mother, who tells him it will lead to adventure. Following her instructions, he rides off into the wilderness until he encounters what he takes to be a child, who can only be seen by the one wearing the ring. After they have argued and fought - the child is unexpectedly strong - the child reveals himself to be the dwarf Alberich and Ortnit's natural father (having stepped in when Ortnit's parents were unable to conceive). He gives Ortnit a suit of golden armour with magical properties and vows to accompany him.

III. (213–287) Ortnit and his army set sail from Messina and, after 10 days at sea, arrive off the coast of Tyre, Machorel's capital. Alberich gives Ortnit a magic stone which allows him to speak and understand any language, and this enables him to pose as a merchant to secure permission to dock. Ortnit wants to take the city immediately, riding through the open gates, but Alberich insists this would be dishonourable. Instead, Alberich goes to Muntabur and gives Machorel a formal challenge: to give his daughter to Ortnit or be attacked. Machorel refuses and flies into a rage.

IV. (288–346) That night Alberich steals hundreds of small boats from the harbour and the army uses these to land. At dawn, the alarm is given in the city and fierce fighting ensues. Alberich notices that all the city gates are open and the heathens may escape and burn the ships. Leaving Ilyas to continue the main battle, Ortnit gives chase. Returning, successful, he finds that Ilyas has lost all his men, and he re-engages to avenge their deaths. With the battle over, Ilyas is shown a cellar where the remaining heathen warriors are hiding and he beheads all of them in revenge, but Ortnit prevents him from killing the women and children. Attending to the wounded, Ortnit laments the many men he has lost.

V. (347–483) At dawn, they set off for Muntabur. On arrival they pitch their tents outside the castle, but are too close and are shot at from the ramparts. That night, however, Alberich steals into the castle and throws the bows and arrows into the moat. Believing this to be the work of the devil, the heathens pressure the queen to let Ortnit have her daughter. But the king rejects the suggestion angrily. The next day, battle is joined. Distressed at the battle and the danger to her father's life, the princess prays to Apollo and Muhammad. Alberich pretends to be a messenger from (the Christian) God but even so cannot persuade the girl to marry Ortnit, until she challenges him to prove he is stronger than her gods, whereupon he shatters her shrine and throws it into the moat. The princess relents in order to spare her father, and sends her ring to Ortnit. Battle ceases and the heathens withdraw into the castle. Alberich sneaks in and brings out the princess to Ortnit, who rides off with her. As soon as her father discovers she is missing he rides in pursuit of Ortnit with his army. In the ensuing battle, the heathen army is completely destroyed, though Machorel escapes to the safety of the castle. Ortnit sets sail and, after the princess has been baptized, they marry.

VI. (484–526) Machorel is visited by a huntsman, who has stolen two eggs from a dragon's cave and offers to take them to Lombardy to hatch so that they can then devastate Ortnit's land. Machorel agrees and sends the huntsman to Lombardy with gifts. Ortnit and his wife are delighted at these signs of reconciliation. After he has shown these to Ortnit, the huntsman reveals that one gift, an elephant, must be left to grow before being given. Ortnit orders the huntsman to be shown to a suitable cave in the mountains and given provisions. As the dragons grow the provisions start to become inadequate and dragons start to devastate the land in their search for food. After a year, in which knights have failed to defeat the dragons, Ortnit decides that he must take on the task himself.

VII. (527–575) During an emotional parting from his wife, who tries to dissuade him, Ortnit tells her that if he fails to return, the knight who comes back with his armour, his ring and the dragon's tongue, will have avenged his death. Alberich refuses to accompany Ortnit, but warns him not to fall asleep. After a day and night wandering at random without finding the dragon, he sits down to rest but is overcome by sleep. When the dragon approaches, Ortnit's hound attempts to wake him, but without success. The dragon gulps him down whole, and, returning to its lair, feeds him to its young, who suck Ortnit out through his armour.

VIII. (576–597) The hound returns to court, and the queen eventually realises that Ortnit is not following it and must be dead. This is confirmed when a vassal follows the hound to where Ortnit was killed. For two years the queen mourns and, is spite of the urging of the court, refuses to remarry unless it's to the knight who avenges Ortnit. For her refusal she is deprived of her wealth and imprisoned in a tower. The margrave takes pity on her and offers to avenge Ortnit, but only once he has a grown son to be his heir. Meanwhile, he sends food and wine to her in the tower. The story concludes with the remark that we will have to wait a long time for the dragon to be killed, as the killer has not yet been born, he who will later be the grandfather of Dietrich of Verona.

=== Ortnit D ===
This version follows that of Ortnit A up to the point where the dragons are terrorising the country, at which point it concludes. It is followed in the manuscript and prints with the story of Hugdietrich's bride quest, which then leads into the story of Wolfdietrich, which, in this version, includes Ortnit's pursuit of the dragon and his death.

After telling of Wolfdietrich's youth, the story introduces the emperor Ortnit, who is told by one of his courtiers of Hugdietrich, King of Greece, and his three sons, who do no fealty to Ortnit. Ortnit sends twelve counts to Hugdietrich to demand tribute. Although the sons threaten to resist violently any claim for tribute, Hugdietrich, in order to save lives, pays in gold. However, Wolfdietrich warns that when he is full grown he will challenge Ortnit.

After Wolfdietrich has married Sigeminne, he decides to follow up his earlier threat to challenge Ortnit. He defeats Ortnit in battle, the two are then reconciled. When Sigeminne is abducted, Ortnit offers to help and they succeed in rescuing her.

Ortnit returns home to find his land being terrorised by two dragons and two giants, Velle and his wife Runze. After killing the giants, he sets out to kill the dragons, but after he has killed the first with the help of an elephant, he mysteriously falls asleep. He wakes up to find himself being carried off by the dragon, and in spite of his attempts to resist he is smashed against a tree and killed.

== Origins ==
While the earliest manuscripts of Ortnit date from the 14th century, the language of the poem suggests composition around 1230 in an Upper German dialect. The name Machorel and the castle of Muntabur seem to be borrowed from the campaign of 1217 in the Fifth Crusade against Sultan al-Malek al-Adel and his fortress at Mount Tabor.

Attempts to derive the story or the figure of Ortnit from Germanic myth or historical personages have not been successful. The many German bride-quest stories, which include Ortnit, König Rother, Orendel and Salman und Morolf, have their roots in late Merovingian history: chronicles contain a number of self-contained bride-quest stories, based ultimately on the Frankish King Clovis I's wooing of Clotilde in 492. All involve a hero travelling to a foreign country to win a bride.

The name Ortnit is cognate with the name Hertnið shared by five different characters in the Þiðreks saga, one of whom is defeated in a battle against a dragon. This suggests a variety of possibly unconnected Ortnit/Hertnið stories were circulating in Northern Germany. The figure of Ortnit's uncle, Ilias, is thought to be derived from the Russian folk hero Ilya Muromets. Northern Germany is the obvious location for the integration of such a character into an Ortnit story.

A parallel with the chanson de geste Huon de Bordeaux has also been noted: in Huon the hero is aided by Auberon, a dwarf with supernatural powers, whose name is cognate with Alberich.

Taken together, all these suggest a geographical origin in Northwest Germany, but the story seems to have been constructed from a variety of elements, not simply retelling an "Ortnit-saga". It is unclear whether the bride-quest and dragon-killing stores first became linked in the Northwest or in Southern Germany, though it seems possible that Ortnit's failure to kill the dragon was necessitated only when his story was linked with Wolfdietrich.

== Form and structure ==
Ortnit and Wolfdietrich are both written in a strophic form called the Hildebrandston (similar to the Nibelungenstrophe used in the Nibelungenlied and Kudrun). It consists of four long-lines: each long-line has three feet with a feminine ending, a caesura, then three feet with a rhymed masculine ending.

Ortnit A
3. Iz wuhse in Lambarten || ein gewaltich kunec reich
dem waz bei den zeiten || dehein kunec gleich
uber elle lant ze Walhen || daz bezaichent daz
die wuile und das er lebte || daz er gewalticlichen saz.

Translation:

There grew up in Lombardy a rich and powerful king.
In his day there was no king his equal
in all the lands of Italy. This is shown by the fact
that as long as he lived he was powerful ruler.

The strophes are marked in the manuscripts by a Lombardic capital.

In the printed Heldenbücher, the Hildebrandston is transformed into the Heunenweise, an eight-line strophe: the long-line is split at the caesura and unrhymed line-endings are given rhymes, with the resulting rhyme scheme ABABCDCD. This necessarily involved considerable rewriting of the text:

Ortnit D, Augsburger Heldenbuch, 1491
2. Ez saß do in lamparten
Ein edeler künig reych
Auff einer burg hieß garten
Man fandt nit seinem geleych
Man nannt in her otniten
Als ichs vernomen han
Man fandt zuo den gezeyten
Kein fürsten so lobesan

Translation:

There ruled in Lombardy
A rich and noble king
In a castle called Garte
His equal was not to be found
He was called Lord Otnit
As I have heard tell
You could find in those days
No prince so praiseworthy.

== Editions ==
- Mone, Franz Joseph, ed. (1821). Otnit. Berlin: Reimer.
- Holtzmann, Adolf, ed. (1865). Der grosse Wolfdietrich. Heidelberg: Mohr.
- von Keller, Adelbert, ed. (1865). Ayrers Dramen. Vol. 2. Stuttgart: Literarischer Verein in Stuttgart. pp. 1025–1185.
- Amelung, Arthur; Jänicke, Oskar, eds. (1871). Deutsches Heldenbuch, dritter Teil: Ortnit und die Wolfdietriche. Berlin: Weidmann. (Includes editions of all versions of the poem, with detailed introductions.)
- von Keller, Adelbert, ed. (1867). Das deutsche Heldenbuch Nach dem mutmasslich ältesten Drucke. Stuttgart: Literarischer Verein in Stuttgart. (Reprinted Georg Olms, Hildesheim, 1966)
- Lunzer, Justus, Edler von Lindhausen (1906). Ortneit und Wolfdietrich nach der Wiener Piaristenhandschrift. Tübingen: Laupp. pp. 1–57. (MS y, Lienhart Scheubels Heldenbuch)
- Schneider, Hermann, ed. (1931). Wolfdietrich. Altdeutsche Textbibliothek, 28. Vol. 1.: der Echte Teil des Wolfdietrich der Ambraser Handschrift (Wolfdietrich A). Tübingen: Niemeyer.
- Fuchs, Edward A. H., ed. (1935). Studies in the Dresdener Heldenbuch: An Edition of Wolfdietrich K. Chicago: University of Chicago. (MS k in current usage, not the Heidelberg MS K.)
- Kofler, Walter, ed. (1999). Das Strassburger Heldenbuch: Rekonstruktion der Textfassung des Diebolt von Hanowe. Göppingen: Kümmerle. ISBN 3874529134.
- Kofler, Walter, ed. (2001). Ortnit und Wolfdietrich D. Kritischer Text nach Ms. Carm. 2 der Stadt- und Universitätsbibliothek Frankfurt am Main. Stuttgart: Hirzel. ISBN 978-3777611297.
- Kofler, Walter, ed. (2006). Das Dresdener Heldenbuch und die Bruchstücke des Berlin-Wolfenbütteler Heldenbuchs: Edition und Digitalfaksimile. Stuttgart: Hirzel. ISBN 9783777614359. (Ortnit C)
- Kofler, Walter, ed. (2009a). Ortnit und Wolfdietrich A. Stuttgart: Hirzel. ISBN 978-3777616438.
- Fuchs-Jolie, Stephan; Millet, Victor; Peschel, Dietmar, eds. (2013). Otnit. Wolf Dietrich. Frühneuhochdeutsch / Neuhochdeutsch. Stuttgart: Reclam. ISBN 978-3-15-019139-2.

== Translations ==
- Weber, Henry William; Jamieson, Robert; Scott, Walter (1814). "Das Heldenbuch – The Book of Heroes". Illustrations of Northern Antiquities from the earlier Teutonic and Scandinavian Romances; being an abstract of the Book of Heroes and Nibelungen Lay; with translations from the old German, Danish, Swedish, and Icelandic languages; with notes and dissertations. Edinburgh: Longman, Hurst, Rees, Orme, and Brown. pp. 45–136. (Prose translation of Wolfdietrich A, with some passages of verse.)
- Guerber, H. A. (1896). Legends Of The Middle Ages Narrated With Special Reference To Literature And Art. New York, Cincinnati, Chicago: American Book Company. pp. 94–109. (A retelling rather than a translation. Reprinted several times under various titles.)
- Ortnit and Wolfdietrich. Two Medieval Romances. Translated by Thomas, J. W. Columbia, South Carolina: Camden House. 1986. ISBN 0938100408.
- Kudrun: With the Book of King Otnit and the Book of Wolf Dietrich. Translated by Whobrey, William T. Indianapolis: Hackett. 2025. ISBN 9781647922108

== See also ==
- Wolfdietrich
