= Evan Kuhlman =

American writer

- Education: University of Notre Dame
- Occupation: Author
- Writing career
- Genre: Children's literature

Evan Kuhlman is an American author of children's novels. Prior to becoming a full-time writer, Kuhlman attended the University of Notre Dame and worked as a restaurant manager and a reporter. Kuhlman has written for various publications such as Glimmer Train and the Notre Dame Review.

== Bibliography ==
=== Books ===
- Wolf Boy (2006)
- The Last Invisible Boy (2008)
- Brother From a Box (2012)
- Great Ball of light (2015)

=== Plays ===
- The Bread Man

== Awards ==
- Short-Story Award for New Writers
- Deutscher Jugendliteraturpreis for Kinderbuch (2011, nomination)
