= Memoirs of an Invisible Man =

1987 novel by H. F. Saint

- First edition
- Author: H. F. Saint
- Cover artist: James Steinberg
- Genre: Science fiction Novel
- Publisher: Atheneum Books (Hardcover, Paperback), Dell Publishing (Paperback)
- Publication date: 1987
- Publication place: United States
- Media type: Print (Hardcover) Print (Paperback)
- Pages: 396 pp
- ISBN: 0-689-11735-3
- OCLC: 15053005
- LC Class: PS3569.A38 M4 1987

Memoirs of an Invisible Man is a 1987 science fiction novel by H. F. Saint.

== Synopsis ==
Nicholas Halloway is a 34-year-old Manhattan securities analyst who writes a narrative memoir (presumably this book) of his life starting on the day of an accident which renders him invisible. He recounts his involvement in a romantic affair with Anne Epstein, a woman who has taken interest in his aptitude for business and is a reporter for the Times. He escorts her to MicroMagnetics where scientists are holding a press conference for research on the magnetic containment of a nuclear process. While there, Nick sees a group of Marxist student protesters who demonstrate nuclear catastrophe by attempting to explode a cat. To get everyone away from the MicroMagnetics presentation, they cut off power to the laboratory where nuclear equipment is operating. The control computers lose function and in a flash of eerie light, everything in a fifty-foot radius becomes invisible, including Nick.

Nick later wakes up in astonishment, believing at first that his limbs were blown off, and later that he is a ghost; he finally realizes the truth. Federal intelligence agents control the site and they soon discover Nick's presence. They lose his trust by attempting to capture him. He overhears that they plan to give him to scientists and enlist him for military espionage, disregarding his personal liberty for national security. He loots miscellaneous invisible items, shoots an agent, and sets fire to the building in the process of escaping.

He returns to his apartment and discovers that food remains visible after he eats it, becoming invisible only after being fully digested. He may remain invisible for the rest of his life, and must surmount obstacles that would not affect a visible person, including driving, working, sheltering, etc. While avoiding government agents, he arranges a fake identity and authorizes funds to make himself a millionaire. He places himself in the care of Alice Barlow, a woman in her late twenties.

== Characters ==
- Nicholas Halloway is the protagonist of the story who lives in Manhattan and was a securities analyst before he became invisible. Throughout the course of the novel, he must avoid detection by the U.S. Government and live out his life as an invisible citizen.
- Alice Barlow is a graphic artist who does book covers. Nick meets her at a party that he is secretly attending where she is part of a conversation about ghosts; he leaves with her (telling her that he is himself a ghost) and begins a romantic relationship with her that becomes (for Nick) dangerously serious.
- Anne Epstein is a journalist and love interest of Nick, and plays a small role of setting up the events that lead to the explosion at MicroMagnetics. When Alice is taken by Jenkins, Nick seeks Anne's help in exposing Jenkins' activities via the press. She later ends up marrying her fiancé instead.
- David Jenkins is a colonel in charge of intelligence assessment who tries to persuade Nick to turn himself in and possibly work with or for him; when Nick refuses, Jenkins is determined to capture him.
- Clellan, Tyler, Gomez, and Morrissey are subordinates of Colonel Jenkins and work on locating Nick and securing the invisible MicroMagnetics site. Tyler gets shot twice by Nick on his escape. They attempt to track Nick throughout the novel.

== Development ==
Harry F. Saint was a 45-year-old Wall Street businessman who had not written anything since a short story to Esquire when he was still a graduate student at Haverford College two decades before. Eventually Saint decided to write a book that had a chance of doing well financially, and the concept of an invisible man came to him at some point – "I must have remembered H. G. Wells or Topper". One publisher and two agents refused it until Atheneum Books purchased it for $5,000.

An audiobook on cassette was later published by Simon & Schuster and performed by Jeff Daniels.

== Critical reception ==
The book is the first and only book written by H. F. Saint, and is generally well received. Time magazine reviewed it as a "flat-out thriller, accurately described by its narrator-hero on the opening page as 'quite genuinely exciting and superficial'". It is applauded by user reviews for its extreme detail in portraying the difficulties of invisibility which makes it unique among other books sharing an invisibility plot. An editorial review from Publishers Weekly describes the book's dialogue as "absolutely true and suspense sustained at high pitch throughout, this supple fantasy attends so cleverly to plausible elements that it entertains from beginning to end". A review for The New York Times complimented the ways in which The Invisible Man was updated to the 1980s and Saint's "droll sense of humor", but criticized the uneven writing and wasted potential. Early on, H. F. Saint was devoted to becoming a full-time writer but later retired due to the book's success.

Even before publishing, Saint earned an estimated $2.5 million USD for both book-club rights and the filming rights, won after a bidding war by Warner Bros. The film version, released in 1992, had less success than the book, being a box office bomb with negative reviews.
