= Rochester Cloak =

Optical cloaking device

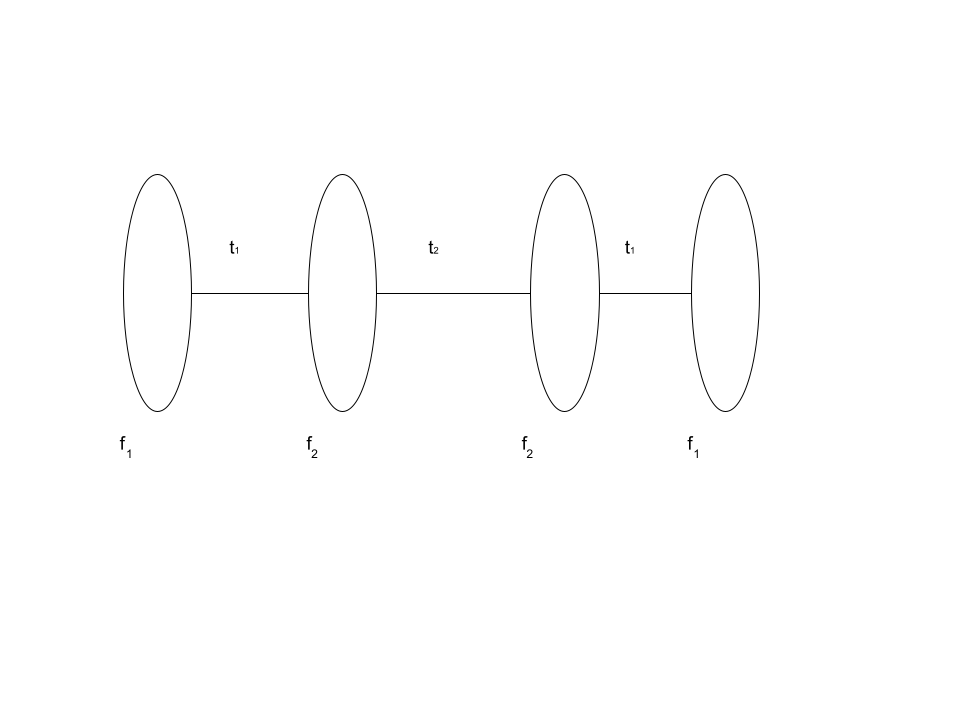
Construction of the Rochester Cloak

Rochester Cloak is a cloaking device which can be built using inexpensive, everyday materials. John Howell, a professor of physics at the University of Rochester, and graduate student Joseph Choi developed the device, which features four standard lenses that allows an object to appear invisible as the viewer moves several degrees away from the optimal viewing positions.
