= Invisible Kid (disambiguation) =

Invisible Kid is a DC comic book superhero.

Invisible Kid may also refer to:

- Invisible Kid (Jacques Foccart), successor to the DC comic book superhero
- "Invisible Kid", a song by Metallica on the album St. Anger
- The Invisible Kid, a 1988 film directed by Avery Crounse
