= The Last Invisible Boy =

2008 children's book by Evan Kuhlman

- First edition
- Author: Evan Kuhlman
- Illustrator: J.P. Coovert
- Language: English
- Genre: Realistic fiction
- Published: 2008 by Atheneum Books for Young Readers
- Publication place: United States of America
- Pages: 234 pages
- Awards: Deutscher Jugendliteraturpreis Nominee for Kinderbuch (2011)
- ISBN: 1416957979
- LC Class: PZ7.K9490113 Las 2008

The Last Invisible Boy is a 2008 children's novel by Evan Kuhlman. The book was first published in hardback on October 21, 2008 through Atheneum Books for Young Readers. The work follows Finn, a young boy dealing with the sudden death of his father.

== Synopsis ==
Finn Garret is slowly turning invisible. After the sudden death of his beloved father, Finn notices that his skin and hair are growing steadily paler, which convinces him that he is on his way to becoming completely invisible. His mother has taken Finn to several doctors, who believe that his new appearance is due to stress and grief over the family's recent loss. Matters are made worse when Finn returns to school and is cruelly mocked for his appearance by his classmates. But as time goes on, Finn finds that his "invisibility" might not be as permanent and inevitable as he might believe it to be.

== Reception ==
Critical reception has been positive. Publishers Weekly and Booklist both gave positive reviews for The Last Invisible Boy, and Publishers Weekly commented "Precise in his metaphors and his characterizations, Kuhlman delivers a study in coping with loss that middle-schoolers will want to absorb and empathize with." Kirkus Reviews also gave the book praise, as they felt that Kuhlman's treatment of Finn's grief was well written and believable.

=== Awards ===
- Deutscher Jugendliteraturpreis for Kinderbuch (2011, nomination)
