= The Invisible Man vs. The Human Fly =

- Theatrical release poster

Japanese name
- Kanji: 透明人間と蝿男
Transcriptions
- Revised Hepburn: Tōmei Ningen to Hae Otoko
- Directed by: Mitsuo Murayama
- Screenplay by: Hajime Takaiwa
- Based on: The Invisible Man suggested by 1897 novel by H. G. Wells
- Produced by: Hidemasa Nagata
- Starring: Ryuji Shinagawa; Yoshiro Kitahara; Junko Kano
- Cinematography: Hiroshi Murai
- Edited by: Shigeo Nishida
- Music by: Tokujirō Ōkubo
- Production company: Daiei Film
- Distributed by: Daiei
- Release date: August 25, 1957 (Japan)
- Running time: 96 minutes
- Country: Japan
- Language: Japanese

The Invisible Man vs. The Human Fly (透明人間と蝿男, Tōmei Ningen to Hae Otoko; lit. 'The Invisible Man and The Fly Man') is a 1957 Japanese science fiction horror film produced and distributed by Daiei Film. It was Daiei's second film based on H. G. Wells' 1897 The Invisible Man after The Invisible Man Appears. The film is directed by Mitsuo Murayama, with special effects by Tōru Matoba and stars Ryuji Shinagawa, Yoshiro Kitahara, and Junko Kano.

== Plot summary ==
A ruthless serial killer with a peculiar method of stalking and killing his victims comes face to face with a police officer who has been turned invisible by a scientific experiment.

== Cast ==
- Ryuji Shinagawa as Dr. Tsukioka, the Invisible Man
- Yoshiro Kitahara as Chief Inspector Wakabayashi
- Junko Kano as Akiko Hayakawa
- Yoshihiro Hamaguchi as Detective Hayama
- Shozo Nanbu as Dr. Hayakawa
- Joji Tsurumi as Sugimoto, Dr. Hayakawa's Assistant
- Bontaro Miake as Chief of the Metropolitan Police
- Ichirō Izawa as Kōkichi Kusunoki, the Human Fly
- Chujo Shizuo as Yamada, the Human Fly
- Naoko Matsudaira as Noriko Maeda

== Release ==
The Invisible Man vs. The Human Fly was released in Japan on August 25, 1957, as a double feature with Suzunosuke Akado: The Vacuum Slash of Asuka and Headbutt and Karate Chop (頭突きと空手チョップ). The film and its precessor were never released outside of Japan until Arrow Video released the film on Blu-ray on March 15, 2021.

== See also ==
- List of Japanese films of 1957
- List of science fiction films of the 1950s
- The Fly (1958)
