= Memoirs of an Invisible Man (film) =

1992 science fiction black comedy film by John Carpenter

- Theatrical release poster
- Directed by: John Carpenter
- Screenplay by: Robert Collector; Dana Olsen; William Goldman
- Based on: Memoirs of an Invisible Man by H. F. Saint
- Produced by: Bruce Bodner; Dan Kolsrud
- Starring: Chevy Chase; Daryl Hannah; Sam Neill; Michael McKean; Stephen Tobolowsky
- Cinematography: William A. Fraker
- Edited by: Marion Rothman
- Music by: Shirley Walker
- Production companies: Le Studio Canal+; Regency Enterprises; Alcor Films; Cornelius Productions
- Distributed by: Warner Bros.
- Release date: February 28, 1992
- Running time: 99 minutes
- Country: United States
- Language: English
- Budget: $30–40 million
- Box office: $14.4 million

Memoirs of an Invisible Man is a 1992 American science fiction black comedy film directed by John Carpenter and starring Chevy Chase, Daryl Hannah, Sam Neill, Michael McKean and Stephen Tobolowsky. The film is loosely based on Memoirs of an Invisible Man, a 1987 novel by H. F. Saint. According to screenwriter William Goldman's book Which Lie Did I Tell?, the film was initially developed for director Ivan Reitman; however, this version never came to fruition due to disagreements between Reitman and Chase.

The film was a critical and box office failure.

== Plot ==
Nick Halloway is a stock analyst in San Francisco who spends most of his life avoiding responsibility and connections with other people. At his favorite bar, the Academy Club, his friend George Talbot introduces him to Alice Monroe, a TV documentary producer. Sharing an instant attraction, Nick and Alice make out in the ladies' room and set a lunch date for Friday.

The following morning, a hungover Nick attends a shareholders' meeting at Magnascopic Laboratories. Unable to endure the droning presentation by Dr. Bernard Wachs, Nick leaves the room for a nap. A lab technician accidentally spills his mug of coffee onto a computer console, causing a meltdown, and the entire building is evacuated. The building seems to explode, but there is no debris. Instead, much of the building is rendered invisible, including Nick.

Shady CIA operative David Jenkins arrives on the scene and discovers Nick's condition. While they are transferring him to an ambulance, the agents joke about how Nick will spend the rest of his life being studied by scientists. In a panic, Nick flees. Jenkins convinces his supervisor Warren Singleton not to notify CIA headquarters so that they can capture and take credit for Nick, who could become the perfect secret agent.

Nick hides at the Academy Club. He locates Dr. Wachs and asks for his help to reverse his condition. Wachs agrees to help, but Jenkins kills him to keep Nick's invisibility a secret. Jenkins' team gets ahold of Nick's background information but it provides no help in finding him, as he has never married and has no relatives or close friends. Nick infiltrates the CIA headquarters to find any information that can be used against them. Jenkins discovers Nick and tries to recruit him, but Nick is disgusted by the idea of him killing people. They have a confrontation, but Nick gets away.

Nick goes to Marin County and stays in George's remote beach house. George arrives with his wife Ellen, Alice, and another friend, to spend the weekend. Nick phones Alice and tells her to meet him nearby. He reveals his condition to Alice, and she promptly faints. When she revives, Alice decides to stay with Nick and help him. They travel by train to Mexico, where Nick can start a new life. To make money, he plans to trade stocks using Alice as a proxy. Jenkins tracks them down and shoots Nick with a tranquilizer gun. Nick falls from the train into a river, reviving him, and he escapes. He makes his way to a video store, where he records his memoirs on video tape, including an ultimatum for Jenkins: exchange Alice for the tape, or Nick will give it to the CIA and the press. Jenkins agrees to the exchange.

At the arranged time for the exchange, Jenkins puts Alice into a cab and orders his men to surround the phone booth where he thinks Nick is. The man in the phone booth turns out to be George, who is dressed in Nick's concealing clothing. Nick is disguised as the cab driver; he takes Alice away, pursued by Jenkins. They continue the chase on foot into a building still under construction, in the course of which Nick gets covered with concrete dust, outlining his silhouette. At the top, by taking off his jacket (which has the largest amount of dust on it), Nick tricks Jenkins into thinking that he has become desperate enough to commit suicide. Nick holds the jacket out to his side and pretends to begin to fall. Jenkins lunges at the jacket to try to save him, but ends up plunging off the building to his death.

Believing Nick to be dead, Singleton releases Alice. Nick reunites with Alice and they leave for Switzerland. The film ends with shots of Nick's apparently empty clothing skiing down a mountainside towards their chalet, where a pregnant Alice greets him with a hot drink and a kiss.

== Cast ==
- Chevy Chase as Nick Halloway
- Daryl Hannah as Alice Monroe
- Sam Neill as David Jenkins
- Michael McKean as George Talbot
- Stephen Tobolowsky as Warren Singleton
- Jim Norton as Dr. Bernard Wachs
- Pat Skipper as Morrissey
- Paul Perri as Gomez
- Richard Epcar as Tyler
- Steven Barr as Clellan
- Gregory Paul Martin as Richard
- Patricia Heaton as Ellen
- Barry Kivel as a drunk businessman
- Donald Li as a cab driver
- Rosalind Chao as Cathy DiTolla
- Jay Gerber as Roger Whitman
- Shay Duffin as Patrick, the bartender
- Edmund L. Shaff as Edward Schneiderman
- Sam Anderson as Chairman of the House Committee
- Elaine Corral as news anchor
- Ellen Albertini Dow as Mrs. Coulson
- Jonathan Wigan as a delivery boy
- I. M. Hobson as maître d'
- Rip Haight (Note: Rip Haight is a pseudonym for John Carpenter) as a helicopter pilot
- Aaron Lustig as a technician

== Production ==
=== Development ===
In 1986, Harry F. Saint's Memoirs of an Invisible Man was still unfinished when Hollywood agent William Morris gave it to Chevy Chase to read. The actor instantly got interested, which led to a bidding war among studios. Warner Bros. Pictures paid $1.35 million for the film rights.

William Goldman was assigned to write the screenplay in the mid-1980s, by which time Ivan Reitman was attached to direct. It was Goldman's first screenplay after what he called his "leper" period when he was in no demand to write scripts; he attributes his comeback to being represented by CAA.

The project was largely a vanity project shepherded by Chase through the studio. (The film is billed as "A Cornelius Production": Cornelius is Chevy Chase's real first name.) He wanted to make a film about the loneliness of invisibility, intending the film to be a bridge into less comedic roles. Goldman did three drafts of the script and Warner was prepared to greenlight the film. However Chase was unhappy with the script. Reitman wanted to proceed with the script, but the studio backed Chase, and Reitman left the project.

Goldman also left the project, reportedly saying to Chase, "I'm sorry, but I'm too old and too rich to put up with this shit." (Goldman later said that he had no memory of saying this but had read in a magazine that he had, adding "Wouldn't that be neat if it was me...?") He also said that Mark Canton, head of the studio, did not pay the writer for all his work, causing Goldman to initiate a lawsuit against them.

Chase found Goldman's script too comedic—"Clark Griswold becoming invisible"—and sought screenwriters to rework it, reportedly to do something "more serious, with more adventure", eventually approaching Dana Olsen and Robert Collector. Richard Donner was attached to direct for eight months due to his experience with visual effects, something that made various potential directors turn down the project. Eventually someone suggested John Carpenter, and Chase approved the idea. Carpenter was then embroiled in a legal dispute with They Live production company Alive Films regarding his contract. He had several projects fall through: a film with Cher called Pincushion, Exorcist III, and a version of Dracula. He was reluctant to make Memoirs at first. "When you have lots of money and lots of time, it's really grueling. I enjoy being an independent, and it's not possible to be one in this situation. But then I thought. 'Why not?' I hadn't done a movie for a long time." The actor had to convince Warner Bros. that Carpenter, whom they still saw as a horror director, could work well for the picture.

=== Writing ===
Carpenter spent eighteen months working along with Olsen and Collector to make the script akin to "North by Northwest meets Starman", developing the love story to give the protagonist Nick a stronger motivation in escaping the villains. During the period, Chase lost 20 pounds, knowing that production and effects work would be physically demanding. "What we tried to do with Memoirs is show his character going through changes," said Carpenter. "Chevy didn’t want to just play somebody like Clark Griswold from the Vacation movies, who never changes." "It’s not about the kind of situation where Claude Rains became invisible and went nuts, nor is it about a wacky guy who’s invisible and looks up girls' skirts throughout the movie," said Chase. "It’s mostly about the peril of being invisible—not the fun or joy of it."

=== Filming ===
Filming lasted 84 days between April and June 1991. Parts of the film were shot in Snowbird, Utah.

Carpenter said that due to the effects work by Industrial Light & Magic, "we essentially had to shoot the same movie twice", as after normal takes the effects team would set up their bulky VistaVision motion control cameras to film the same elements again while gathering digital data for the computer-generated imagery.

According to visual effects supervisor Bruce Nicholson, "Success in this movie was showing invisibility in detail". During nine months of preparation, Nicholson studied four previous films on the subject: The Invisible Man (1933), which receives an homage in the scene where Nick is shown to have his head wrapped in bandages and is wearing large dark goggles; its sequel The Invisible Man Returns (1940); Bedknobs and Broomsticks (1971); and Ghost (1990).

Chase wore a blue bodysuit below his clothing, so that computer artists could erase his body through chroma key and match the clothes with computer-generated replicas so that even the inside of the clothing could be seen, along with other touches such as erasing the shadow made by Chase's body. A particularly elaborate effect had Nick's invisible face being covered in flesh-colored make-up. The make-up was applied to Chase as his head was covered in viscous blue cosmetic, tongue and teeth coated with blue food coloring, and the cornea of each eye covered with blue contact lenses, an uncomfortable makeover made worse by the June heat and heavy studio lighting.

An alternate ending was filmed showing Alice giving birth to an invisible child. Carpenter later stated that this ending was cut because "Warner Brothers was worried that the audience would react to the invisible baby as if it were a freak, an unfortunate and innocent diabolical child. Warner Brothers is in the business of making audience-friendly, non-challenging movies. I was aware of this when I signed on [to the film], so I guess I shouldn't complain. Still, we could have released a somewhat stronger version of the picture. But it was a big studio film and it suffered from what a lot of studio movies suffer from: the audience preview process, when you cut every highpoint and lowpoint, and make it very bland."

Carpenter would go on to say that the production of the film was very troubling and vigorous. While also battling studio executives, Carpenter claimed Chase and Hannah were "the stuff of nightmares" and "impossible to direct". In particular, Chase would often refuse to wear his special effects makeup and would remove it prematurely, ruining a day's worth of filming.

=== Music ===
This is one of the few John Carpenter films not scored by the director, with Shirley Walker composing the music instead. Unlike prior collaborators Ennio Morricone on The Thing and Jack Nitzsche on Starman, Walker would team back up with Carpenter, the two co-scoring the subsequent Escape from L.A.. She was suggested to work on the movie when Jack Nitzsche refused to do it – a landmark decision, not just because Carpenter often composed his own scores, but because it was one of the first times a female composer had a solo credit on a major studio picture. It would become Walker's first official solo film score. Walker has the distinction of being the first woman to have composed an entire symphonic score, which she also orchestrated and conducted alone. After this she got recognition and went to do movies like Batman: Mask of the Phantasm, Turbulence, Willard and the first three Final Destination movies.

== Reception ==
=== Box office ===
The film debuted at No. 2. It went on to gross $14,358,033 USD.

=== Critical reception ===
The film received mostly negative responses from critics. It has a 30% approval rating on Rotten Tomatoes, based on 37 reviews. The website's critical consensus reads: "It boasts an intriguing cast and the special effects were groundbreaking, but they can't compensate for Memoirs of an Invisible Man's sadly pedestrian script". Metacritic gives the film a weighted average score of 48 out of 100, based on 19 critics, indicating "mixed or average reviews". Audiences polled by CinemaScore gave the film an average grade of "B" on an A+ to F scale.

Roger Ebert wrote of the film, "The plot is lazy and conventional. What is good about the movie involves Chase and Hannah, who have to work out between them the logistical problems of their strange relationship." Reviewing the movie for The Washington Post, Desson Howe mused, "Memoirs of an Invisible Man isn't a movie. It's an identity crisis. The previews would have you believe it's a zany comedy. But the jokes are too few and far between. And if it's a comedy, why is John Carpenter directing it? This is the man who did Halloween ... if Memoirs wants to get serious, why is Chevy Chase in the lead? This is the man who starred in National Lampoon's European Vacation."

While reviewing the DVD release of the film for Film Freak Central, Bill Chambers wrote that Carpenter's use of effects makes the film worth seeing. He feels that the scene where Nick's body is outlined by raindrops is more effectively imagined than an identical scene in Daredevil.

In 2023, John Carpenter said:

It gave me a chance to make a quasi-serious movie. But Chevy Chase, Sam Neill — who I love and had a longtime friendship with — and Warner Bros. … I worked for them, and it was pleasant. No, it wasn’t pleasant at all. I’m lying to you. It was a horror show. I really wanted to quit the business after that movie. God, I don’t want to talk about why, but let’s just say there were personalities on that film … he shall not be named who needs to be killed. No, no, no, that’s terrible. He needs to be set on fire. No, no, no. Anyway, it’s all fine. I survived it.

== Bibliography ==
- Boulenger, Gilles (2001). John Carpenter: The Prince of Darkness. Silman-James Press. ISBN 978-1879505674.
- Ferrante, Anthony C. (March 1992). "Memoirs of an Invisible Director". Fangoria. No. 110. pp. 42–45.
- Shapiro, Marc (October 1991). "Memoirs of an Invisible Man". Starlog. No. 171. pp. 41–45.
- Shapiro, Marc (May 1992). "I'm Invisible and You're Not". Starlog. No. 178. pp. 7–9.
- Swires, Steve (April 1992). "John Carpenter's Guide to Hollywood (In)visibility". Starlog. No. 177. pp. 28–33, 71.
