= Cloak of invisibility =

Mythical object that grants invisibility

- Folk lore and fairy tales element
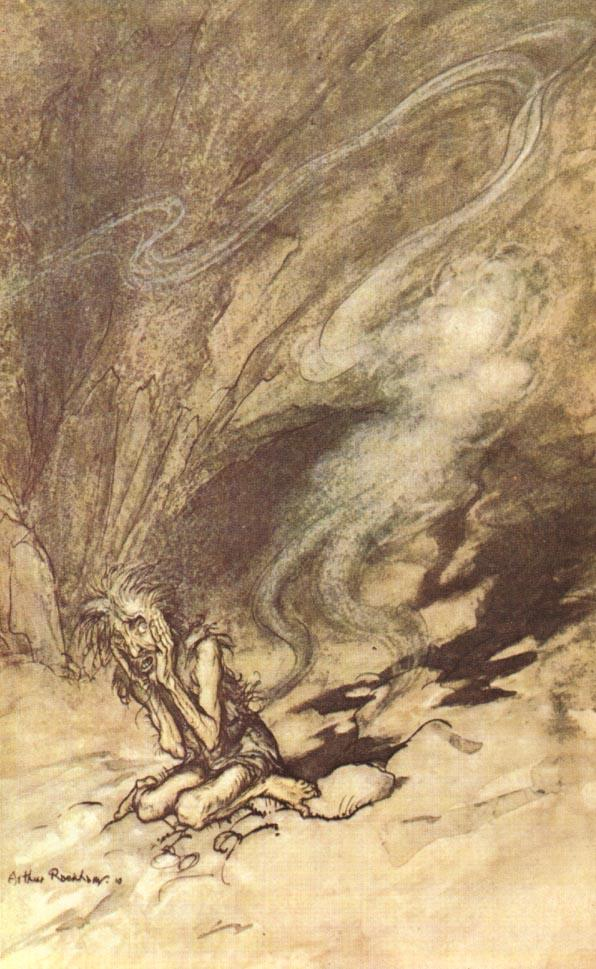
- Alberich puts on the Tarnkappe and vanishes; illustration by Arthur Rackham to Richard Wagner's Das Rheingold
- First appearance: Ancient
- Genre: Folklore and fairy tales

In-universe information
- Type: Magical cape
- Function: Renders the wearer invisible

A cloak of invisibility is an item that prevents the wearer from being seen. In folklore, mythology and fairy tales, a cloak of invisibility appears either as a magical item used by duplicitous characters or an item worn by a hero to fulfill a quest. It is a common theme in Welsh mythology and Germanic folklore, and may originate with the cap of invisibility seen in ancient Greek myths. The motif falls under "D1361.12 magic cloak of invisibility" in the Stith Thompson motif index scheme.

== In folklore ==
Cloaks of invisibility are magical items found in folklore and fairy tales. Such cloaks are common in Welsh mythology; a "Mantle of Invisibility" is described in the tale Culhwch and Olwen (c. 1100) as one of King Arthur's most prized possessions. The mantle is described again, and in more detail, in the Breuddwyd Rhonabwy, and is later listed as one of the Thirteen Treasures of the Island of Britain. A similar mantle appears in the Second Branch of the Mabinogi, in which it is used by Caswallawn to assassinate the seven stewards left behind by Bran the Blessed and usurp the throne.

In the English fairy tale Jack the Giant Killer, the hero is rewarded with several magical gifts by a giant he has spared, among them a coat of invisibility. Iona and Peter Opie observe in The Classic Fairy Tales (1974), that Jack's coat may have been borrowed from the Tale of Tom Thumb or from Norse mythology, but they also draw comparisons with the Celtic stories of the Mabinogion.

The counterpart in Japan is the kakuremino (隠れ蓑), a magical "straw cape" or "raincoat" of invisibility. In the folktale of the "Peach Boy" Momotarō, one of the treasures the hero collects from the ogres is a cape of invisibility, paralleling the story of Jack the giant-slayer.

=== Tarnkappe ===
Although occurrences in fairy tales are rare, the cloak of invisibility appears in the German tale The Twelve Dancing Princesses (KHM 133) and in The King of the Golden Mountain (KHM 92) in Grimm's Fairy Tales. The cloak in German fairy tales may be traceable to the tarnkappe ("cloak of concealment"), such as the one that the hero Sîfrit (Siegfried) acquires from the dwarf Alberich in the Middle High German epic Nibelungenlied. The Grimms clarify that Sîfrit's kappe is a cape that covers not just the head but enshrouds the body, though in later times tarnkappe came to be regarded as a cap of invisibility. The tarnkappe (or tarnkeppelin) is also owned by the dwarf king who is the title character in Laurin. In different passages or variant manuscripts of these works, the tarnkappe is also referred to as the tarnhût (mod. Ger. Haut "skin") or hehlkappe (mod. Ger. hehlen "to hide").

=== Modern adaptations ===
In the original epic Nibelungenlied, the hero's cloak not only grants him invisibility, but also increases his strength, to win over the Icelandic queen Brünhild. In Richard Wagner's opera cycle Der Ring des Nibelungen, the cloak becomes a magic helmet called the Tarnhelm, which also imparts the ability to transform upon its wearer. When Fritz Lang adapted Nibelungenlied for the movie screen in his 1924 film Die Nibelungen, Siegfried uses a veil or net of invisibility gained from the dwarf Alberich.

== In fiction ==
Raoul Walsh's film The Thief of Bagdad, was released in the same year as Die Nibelungen and also features a cloak of invisibility playing a pivotal role.

Edgar Rice Burroughs uses the idea of an invisibility cloak in his 1931 novel A Fighting Man of Mars. The movie Erik the Viking humorously depicts the title character using a cloak of invisibility, which he does not realize apparently works only on elderly men. In The Lord of the Rings, Frodo, and the other members of the Fellowship of the Ring, were given cloaks by the Elves, and Samwise asked, "Are these magic cloaks?" The cloak given to Frodo camouflaged him so that the enemy could see "nothing more than a boulder where the Hobbits were."

Camouflaging cloaks form a central plot element in Samuel R. Delany's 1975 novel Dhalgren.

Cloaks of invisibility also exist in the Harry Potter series of novels by J.K. Rowling. Harry Potter uses a Cloak of Invisibility, that was passed down to him by his father, to sneak into forbidden areas of his school and remain unseen. It is later revealed that this specific cloak was once owned by Death himself, making it one of the Deathly Hallows.

In The Secret History by Donna Tartt (1992), the character Richard says, "I became expert at making myself invisible"..."Sunday afternoons, my cloak of invisibility around my shoulders, I would sit in the infirmary for sometimes six hours at a time..."

== In science ==
On October 19, 2006, a cloak was produced that routed microwaves of a particular frequency around a copper cylinder in a way that made them emerge almost as if there were nothing there. The cloak was made from metamaterials. It cast a small shadow, which the designers hope to fix.

The device obscures a defined two dimensional region and only at a particular microwave frequency. Work on achieving similar results with visible light is in progress. Other types of invisibility cloak are also possible, including ones that cloak events rather than objects.

However, cloaking a human-sized object at visible wavelengths appears to have low probability. Indeed, there appears to be a fundamental problem with these devices as "invisibility cloaks":

It's not yet clear that you're going to get the invisibility that everyone thinks about with Star Trek cloaking device or the Harry Potter's cloak. To make an object literally vanish before a person's eyes, a cloak would have to simultaneously interact with all of the wavelengths, or colors, that make up light.

On the other hand, a group of researchers connected with Berkeley Lab and the University of California, Berkeley believe that cloaking at optical frequencies is indeed possible. Furthermore, it appears within reach. Their solution to the hurdles presented by cloaking issues are dielectrics. These nonconducting materials (dielectrics) are used for a carpet cloak, which serves as an optical cloaking device. According to the lead investigator:

We have come up with a new solution to the problem of invisibility based on the use of dielectric (nonconducting) materials. Our optical cloak not only suggests that true invisibility materials are within reach, it also represents a major step towards transformation optics, opening the door to manipulating light at will for the creation of powerful new microscopes and faster computers.

Furthermore, a new cloaking system was announced in the beginning of 2011 that is effective in visible light and hides macroscopic objects, i.e. objects that can be seen with the human eye. The cloak is constructed from ordinary, and easily obtainable calcite. The crystal consists of two pieces configured according to specific parameters. The calcite is able to refract the light around a solid object positioned between the crystals. The system employs the natural birefringence of the calcite. From outside the system the object is not visible "for at least 3 orders of magnitude larger than the wavelength of light in all three dimensions." The calcite solves for the limitations of attempting to cloak with metallic inclusions - this method does not require a nanofabrication process as has become necessary with the other methods of cloaking. The nanofabrication process is time-consuming and limits the size of the cloaked region to a microscopic area. The system works best under green light. In addition the researchers appear to be optimistic about a practical cloaking device in the future:

In summary, we have demonstrated the first macroscopic cloak operating at visible frequencies, which transforms a deformed mirror into a flat one from all viewing angles. The cloak is capable of hiding three-dimensional objects three to four orders of magnitudes larger than optical wavelengths, and therefore, it satisfies a layman's definition of an invisibility cloak: namely, the cloaking effect can be directly observed without the help of microscopes. Because our work solves several major issues typically associated with cloaking: size, bandwidth, loss, and image distortion, it paves the way for future practical cloaking devices

Another design calls for tiny metal needles to be fitted into a hairbrush-shaped cone at angles and lengths that would force light to pass around the cloak. This would make everything inside the cone appear to vanish because the light would no longer reflect off it. "It looks pretty much like fiction, I do realize, but it's completely in agreement with the laws of physics," said lead researcher Vladimir Shalaev, a professor of electrical and computer engineering at Purdue. "Ideally, if we make it real it would work exactly like Harry Potter's invisibility cloak," he said. "It's not going to be heavy because there's going to be very little metal in it."

Furthermore, on April 30, 2009, two teams of scientists developed a cloak that rendered objects invisible to near-infrared light. Unlike its predecessors, this technology did not utilize metals, which improves cloaking since metals cause some light to be lost. Researchers mentioned that since the approach can be scaled down further in size, it was a major step towards a cloak that would work for visible light.

=== Problems of refraction and opacity ===
The headlined claims that laboratory results with metamaterials are demonstrations of prototype invisibility cloaks conflicts with two facts resulting from fundamental characteristics of the underlying metamaterial technology:

- These materials are, by nature, highly dispersive, hence light passing around a "cloaked" object would be strongly refracted (prisms are not invisible).
- Currently light passing through these materials is partially absorbed, making the shield partially opaque.
- Light redirected around an object takes a longer path than that arriving directly from the background. This introduces a parallax error that makes nearby background objects look further away than they should, revealing the cloak by distortions. Over long distances - such as lines of sight to the horizon - this may go unnoticed.
- Perfect cloaking by materials may be problematic, when taking causality into account.

=== Acoustic cloaking ===
Though perfect cloaking based on invisible paint is impossible if detectors (such as microphones) and sources (such as loudspeakers) are placed round a volume and if a particular formula is used to calculate the signals to be fed to the sources, perfect cloaking is possible. Such perfect cloaking does require that the information can flow through the volume fast enough and the calculations can be performed fast enough so that the necessary information can get to the sources on the far side of the volume fast enough. As a result, perfect cloaking for light is still probably at least very difficult if not impossible. For sound waves, though, such perfect cloaking is possible in principle; an object could therefore be made invisible to sonar, for example.

According to Fermat's Principle, light follows the trajectory of the shortest optical path, that is, the path over which the integral of the refractive index function is minimal. Therefore, the refractive index of an optical medium determines how light propagates within it. Consequently, by a suitable choice of refractive index profile for an optical medium, light rays can be bent around and made to propagate in closed loops.

== See also ==
- Acoustic cloak
- Cloaking device
- Invisibility
- Magic ring

== Bibliography ==
- Stephens, Meic, ed. (1998). The New Companion to the Literature of Wales. Cardiff: University of Wales Press. ISBN 978-0-7083-1383-1.
