= Cloaking device =

Theoretical device to render objects invisible

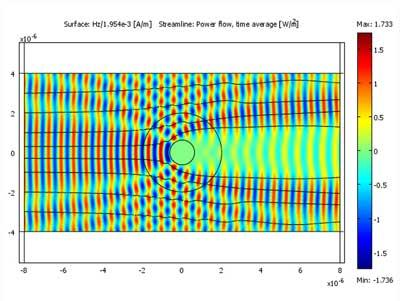
Simulation of a hypothetical cloaking device. Normally, incident light waves on an object are absorbed or reflected, causing the object to appear visible.

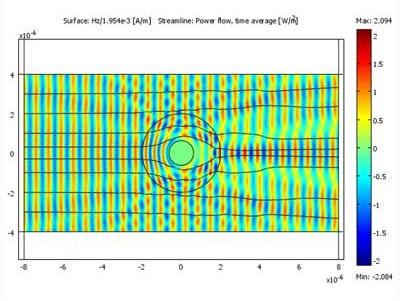
With the cloaking device active, light is 'deflected' around the object to make it appear as if it did not exist, rendering it invisible.

A cloaking device is a hypothetical or fictional stealth technology that can cause objects, such as spaceships or individuals, to be partially or wholly invisible to parts of the electromagnetic (EM) spectrum. Fictional cloaking devices have been used as plot devices in various media for many years.

Developments in scientific research show that real-world cloaking devices can obscure objects from at least one wavelength of EM emissions. Scientists already use artificial materials called metamaterials to bend light around an object. However, over the entire spectrum, a cloaked object scatters more than an uncloaked object.

== Fictional origins ==
Cloaks with magical powers of invisibility appear from the earliest days of story-telling. A notable example is the Cloak of Invisibility from the Harry Potter franchise.

Though the concept is more widely used in the genre of Science fiction. The earliest example of this was the 1892 novel The Germ Growers in which blob-like alien invaders use invisible spaceships to set up base in Australia. Though it’s important to note that unlike later depictions, the cloaking device isn’t built in but instead painted on. Since then, many variations on the theme with proposed basis in reality have been imagined.

Star Trek screenwriter Paul Schneider, inspired in part by the 1958 film Run Silent, Run Deep, and in part by The Enemy Below, which had been released in 1957, imagined cloaking as a space-travel analog of a submarine submerging, and employed it in the 1966 Star Trek episode "Balance of Terror", in which he introduced the Romulan species, whose space vessels employ cloaking devices extensively. (He likewise predicted, in the same episode, that invisibility, "selective bending of light" as described above, would have an enormous power requirement.) Another Star Trek screenwriter, D.C. Fontana, coined the term "cloaking device" for the 1968 episode "The Enterprise Incident", which also featured Romulans.

Star Trek placed a limit on use of this device: a space vessel cannot fire weapons, employ defensive shields, or operate transporters while cloaked; thus it must "decloak" to fire. At this point, Trek parted ways with the submarine analogy (subs don't "surface" to launch torpedoes), instead anticipating a significant limitation of Stealth technology: aircraft like the B-2 bomber cannot avoid becoming un-stealthy during the time their bomb bay doors are open.

Writers and game designers have since incorporated cloaking devices into many other science-fiction narratives, including Doctor Who, Star Wars, and Stargate.

== Scientific experimentation ==
An operational, non-fictional cloaking device might be an extension of the basic technologies used by stealth aircraft, such as radar-absorbing dark paint, optical camouflage, cooling the outer surface to minimize electromagnetic emissions (usually infrared), or other techniques to minimize other EM emissions, and to minimize particle emissions from the object. The use of certain devices to jam and confuse remote sensing devices would greatly aid in this process, but is more properly referred to as "active camouflage". Alternatively, metamaterials provide the theoretical possibility of making electromagnetic radiation pass freely around the 'cloaked' object.

=== Metamaterial research ===
Optical metamaterials have featured in several proposals for invisibility schemes. "Metamaterials" refers to materials that owe their refractive properties to the way they are structured, rather than the substances that compose them. Using transformation optics it is possible to design the optical parameters of a "cloak" so that it guides light around some region, rendering it invisible over a certain band of wavelengths.

These spatially varying optical parameters do not correspond to any natural material, but may be implemented using metamaterials. There are several theories of cloaking, giving rise to different types of invisibility. In 2014, scientists demonstrated good cloaking performance in murky water, demonstrating that an object shrouded in fog can disappear completely when appropriately coated with metamaterial. This is due to the random scattering of light, such as that which occurs in clouds, fog, milk, frosted glass, etc., combined with the properties of the metamaterial coating. When light is diffused, a thin coat of metamaterial around an object can make it essentially invisible under a range of lighting conditions.

=== Active camouflage ===
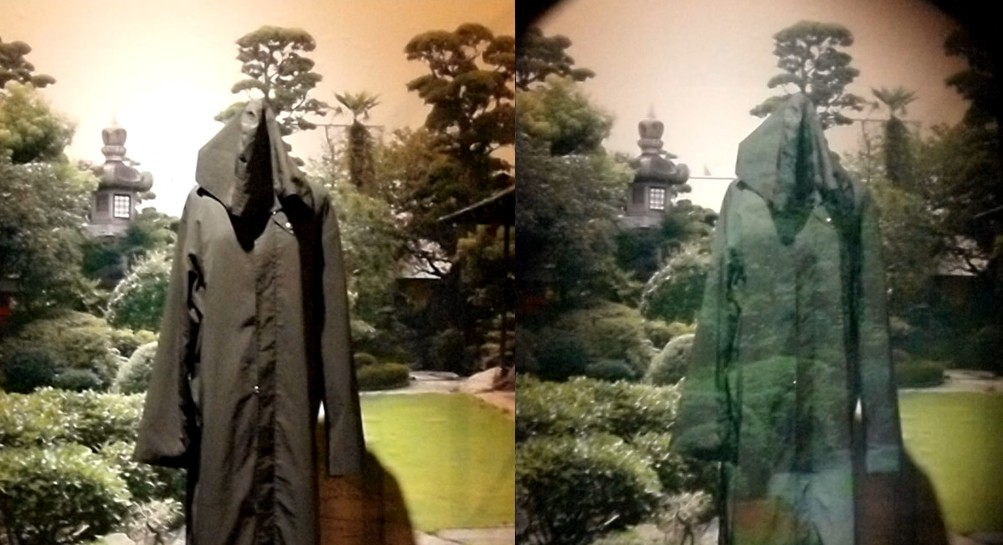
A coat using optical camouflage by Susumu Tachi. Left: The coat seen without a special device. Right: The same coat seen though the half-mirror projector part of the Retro-Reflective Projection Technology.

Active camouflage (or adaptive camouflage) is a group of camouflage technologies which would allow an object (usually military in nature) to blend into its surroundings by use of panels or coatings capable of changing color or luminosity. Active camouflage can be seen as having the potential to become the perfection of the art of camouflaging things from visual detection.

Optical camouflage is a kind of active camouflage in which one wears a fabric which has an image of the scene directly behind the wearer projected onto it, so that the wearer appears invisible. The drawback to this system is that, when the cloaked wearer moves, a visible distortion is often generated as the 'fabric' catches up with the object's motion. The concept exists for now only in theory and in proof-of-concept prototypes, although many experts consider it technically feasible.

It has been reported that the British Army has tested an invisible tank. Mercedes demonstrated an invisible car using LED and camera in 2012.

=== Plasma stealth ===
Plasma at certain density ranges absorbs certain bandwidths of broadband waves, potentially rendering an object invisible. However, generating plasma in air is too expensive and a feasible alternative is generating plasma between thin membranes instead. The Defense Technical Information Center is also following up research on plasma reducing RCS technologies. A plasma cloaking device was patented in 1991.

=== Metascreen ===
A prototype Metascreen is a claimed cloaking device, which is just few micrometers thick and to a limited extent can hide 3D objects from microwaves in their natural environment, in their natural positions, in all directions, and from all of the observer's positions. It was prepared at the University of Texas at Austin by Professor Andrea Alù.

The metascreen consisted of a 66 micrometre thick polycarbonate film supporting an arrangement of 20 micrometer thick copper strips that resembled a fishing net. In the experiment, when the metascreen was hit by 3.6 GHz microwaves, it re-radiated microwaves of the same frequency that were out of phase, thus cancelling out reflections from the object being hidden. The device only cancelled out the scattering of microwaves in the first order. The same researchers published a paper on "plasmonic cloaking" the previous year.

=== Howell/Choi cloaking device ===
University of Rochester physics professor John Howell and graduate student Joseph Choi have announced a scalable cloaking device which uses common optical lenses to achieve visible light cloaking on the macroscopic scale, known as the "Rochester Cloak". The device consists of a series of four lenses which direct light rays around objects which would otherwise occlude the optical pathway.

=== Cloaking in mechanics ===
The concepts of cloaking are not limited to optics but can also be transferred to other fields of physics. For example, it was possible to cloak acoustics for certain frequencies as well as touching in mechanics. This renders an object "invisible" to sound or even hides it from touching.

== See also ==
- Cloak
- Invisibility
- Cloak of invisibility
- Metamaterial
- Philadelphia Experiment
- Stealth technology
