= The Invisible Man Appears =

- Theatrical release poster

Japanese name
- Kanji: 透明人間現わる
Transcriptions
- Revised Hepburn: Tōmei Ningen Arawaru
- Directed by: Nobuo Adachi
- Screenplay by: Nobuo Adachi
- Story by: Akimitsu Takagi
- Based on: The Invisible Man by H. G. Wells
- Produced by: Hisashi Okuda
- Starring: Kanji Koshiba; Chizuru Kitagawa; Takiko Mizunoe; Daijirō Natsukawa; Ryūnosuke Tsukigata; Kichijiro Ueda
- Cinematography: Hideo Ishimoto
- Edited by: Shigeo Nishida
- Music by: Goro Nishi
- Production company: Daiei Film
- Distributed by: Daiei
- Release date: 1949 (Japan)
- Running time: 87 minutes
- Country: Japan
- Language: Japanese

The Invisible Man Appears (1949) by Nobuo Adachi

The Invisible Man Appears (Japanese: 透明人間現わる, Hepburn: Tōmei Ningen Arawaru) is a 1949 Japanese science fiction tokusatsu film directed by Nobuo Adachi, with special effects by Eiji Tsuburaya. The film was loosely based on H. G. Wells' 1897 The Invisible Man and produced by Daiei Film, the film stars Kanji Koshiba, Chizuru Kitagawa, Takiko Mizunoe, Daijirō Natsukawa, Ryūnosuke Tsukigata, and Kichijiro Ueda.

== Plot ==
A gang of thugs intend to use an invisibility formula created by Professor Nakazato to rob a priceless jewel necklace "The Tears of Amour."

== Cast ==
- Kanji Koshiba as Shunji Kurokawa, the Invisible Man
- Chizuru Kitagawa as Machiko Nakazato
- Takiko Mizunoe as Ryuko Mizuki
- Ryūnosuke Tsukigata as Kenzo Nakazato
- Daijirō Natsukawa as Kyosuke Segi
- Kichijiro Ueda as Otoharu Sugimoto
- Shosaku Sugiyama as Ichiro Kawabe
- Mitsusaburo Ramon as Matsubara, lead investigator

== Themes ==
The Invisible Man Appears was influenced by exposure to American films during the Allied Occupation of Japan following World War II.

== Production ==
The film was initially tentatively titled Invisible Demon by Hisashi Okuda. According to Okuda, When he showed the plan to Eiji Tsuburaya, who had just been expelled from public office, Tsuburaya promised, "I am willing to cooperate because I believe this is worth considering."

== Release ==
The Invisible Man Appears was released in Japan in 1949. The film and its follow-up were never released outside of Japan until Arrow Video released the film on Blu-ray March 15, 2021.

== Follow-up ==
Daiei produced a second film inspired by H. G. Wells' The Invisible Man novel, titled The Invisible Man vs. The Human Fly (透明人間と蝿男), which was released to Japanese theaters on August 25, 1957.
