= Alberich =

German legendary dwarf

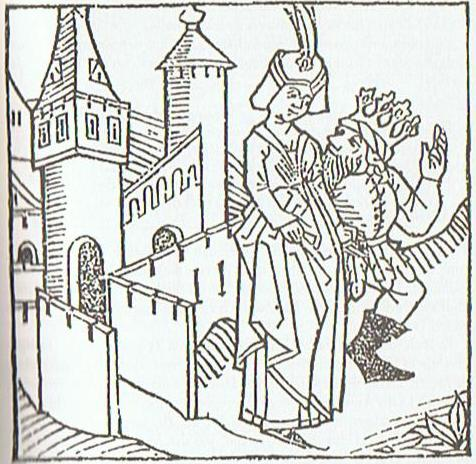
Alberich seduces the king's mother (a scene from Ortnit, 1480 woodcut)

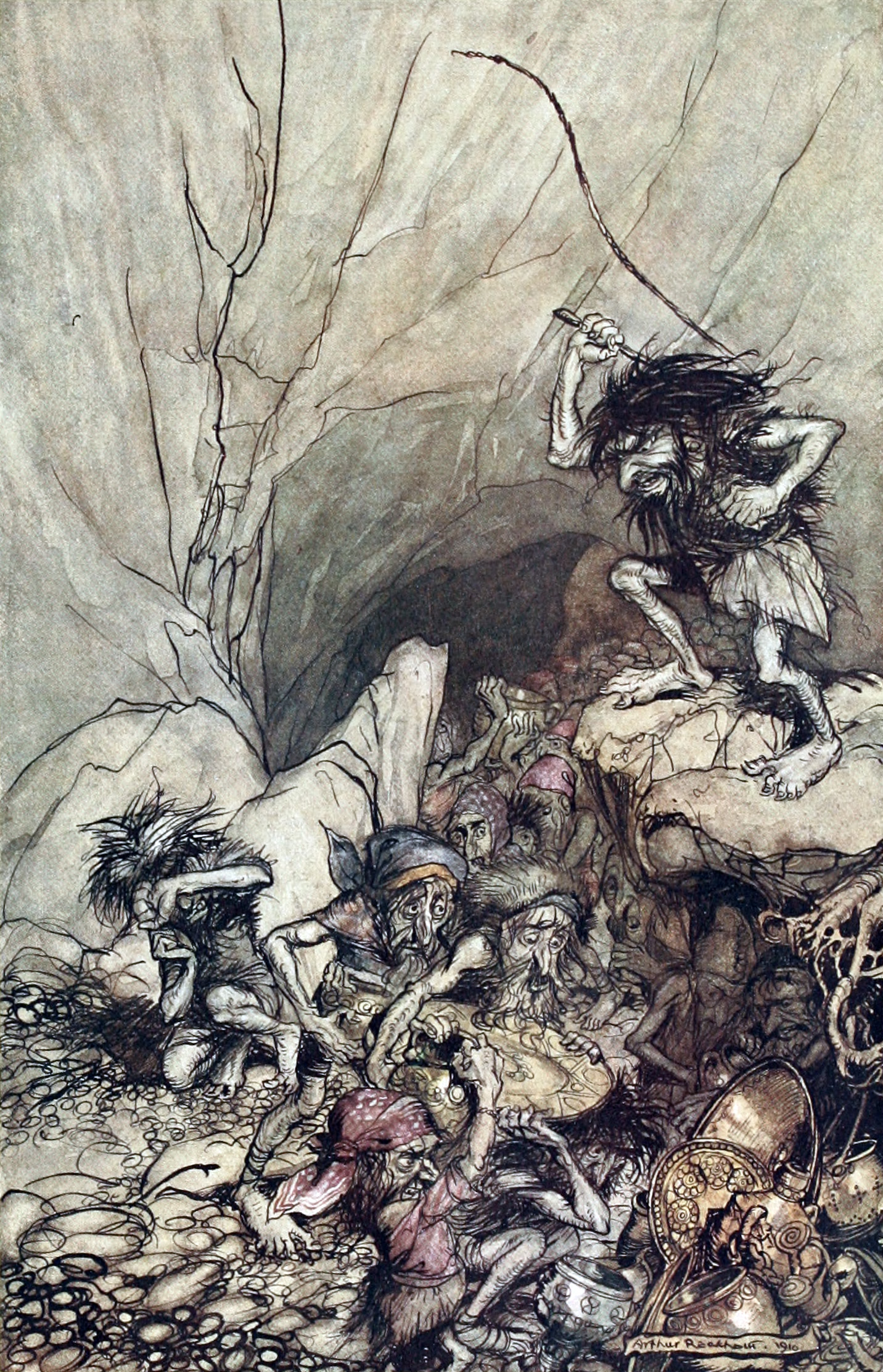
Alberich (with whip) drives on the Nibelung dwarfs, who collect gold and other treasures. (Arthur Rackham, 1910)

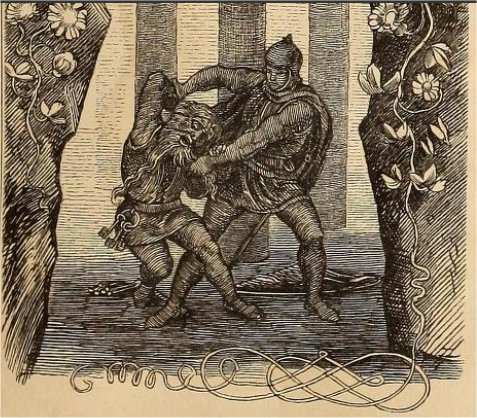
Siegfried wrestles with Alberich (Julius Schnorr von Carolsfeld, 1843)

In German heroic legend, Alberich (German: [ˈalbəʁɪç]) is a dwarf. He features most prominently in the poems Nibelungenlied and Ortnit. He also features in an Old Norse collection of German legends, Thidreksaga, under the name Alfrikr. His name consists of the elements alb ("elf") and ric "power" or "ruler". It is equivalent to the Old French Alberon or Auberon, from which the English Oberon is derived, and is the source of the Norman French derivation Aubry.

The name was later used for a character in Richard Wagner's opera cycle Der Ring des Nibelungen.

== Mythology ==
Alberich plays a prominent role in the Nibelungenlied, where he is the guardian of the Nibelung's treasure and has the strength of twelve men. Siegfried overpowers him using his cloak of invisibility (Tarnkappe), and the dwarf then serves the hero. Siegfried later pulls his beard in mock combat when he arrives unannounced to claim the treasure. Ortnit seeks to woo the daughter of the heathen king Machorel, Alberich reveals his paternity to Ortnit and aids him in his quest, playing tricks on the heathen king. When Ortnit sets out on his final fatal adventure against a plague of dragons, Alberich takes back the magic ring and warns Ortnit not to go on his quest.

In the Thidrekssaga, Alfrikr makes the swords Eckisax and Nagelringr, giving this last sword to Thidrek.

References to Alberich outside of heroic poetry are rare.

== Wagner ==
In Richard Wagner's opera cycle Der Ring des Nibelungen, Alberich is the chief of the Nibelungen race of dwarves and the main antagonist driving events. In Das Rheingold, the first opera in the cycle, he gains the power to forge the ring after renouncing love and stealing the gold of the river Rhein, of which the ring is made. His brother, the smith Mime, creates the Tarnhelm for Alberich. News of the gold robbery and ring of power incites gods and giants alike to action. The giants Fafner and Fasolt demand the ring in payment for building Valhalla, and carry off Freia as a hostage. In Götterdämmerung (the fourth opera in Wagner's cycle), Hagen, the murderer of the hero Siegfried, is the half-human half-dwarf son of Alberich by Grimhilde, a human woman. This detail of Hagen's origin is Wagner's invention, not taken from the myth or epic poems, in which Hagen is an ordinary human being with human parents.

Wagner's Alberich is a composite character, mostly based on Alberich from the Nibelungenlied, but also on Andvari from Norse mythology. He has been widely described, most notably by Theodor Adorno, as a negative Jewish stereotype, with his race expressed through "distorted" music and "muttering" speech; other critics, however, disagree with this assessment.

Alberich shows up in Rheingold, not in Walküre, then again in Siegfried and finally in Götterdämmerung (while Hagen is sleeping, commanding Hagen to regain the Ring). At the end of the opera, Alberich along with the three Rhine maidens are the only key characters in Der Ring des Nibelungen that remain alive. Wotan seems to die at the end of Götterdämmerung when Valhalla goes up in flames, Fasolt from Rheingold dies in Rheingold, Sieglinde and Siegmund from Walküre die in Walküre (Sieglinde is at least dead by the time Siegfried begins, some 15–20 years later), Mime (from Rheingold and Siegfried) dies in Siegfried, Gunther and Hagen from Götterdämmerung both die at the end of it, and Siegfried (from Siegfried and Götterdämmerung) and Brunhilde (from Walküre, Siegfried, and Götterdämmerung) both die in Götterdämmerung.

== Legacy ==
In World War I, the German retreat to fortified positions in the Hindenburg Line, officially named the Siegfried Position, was named Operation Alberich.

During World War II, Germany developed anechoic tiles, which were nicknamed Alberich.

In Genevieve Cogman’s Invisible Library fantasy book series, Alberich is the primary antagonist to the main character, the librarian Irene. He is a powerful and mysterious figure whose actions and motives create significant challenges for Irene and her mission to retrieve rare books from alternate worlds.

Alberich is a character who appears as bodyguard, teacher, and spy in various books in the series about the world Velgarth by Mercedes Lackey.

== See also ==
- Oberon (the French translation of Alberich used for the name of the "King of Fairies" in French and English texts)
- Elegast/Elbegast/Alegast— elf guest, elf spirit (Dutch, German, and Scandinavian texts, respectively)
