= Tarnhelm =

Magic helmet depicted in the ring cycle

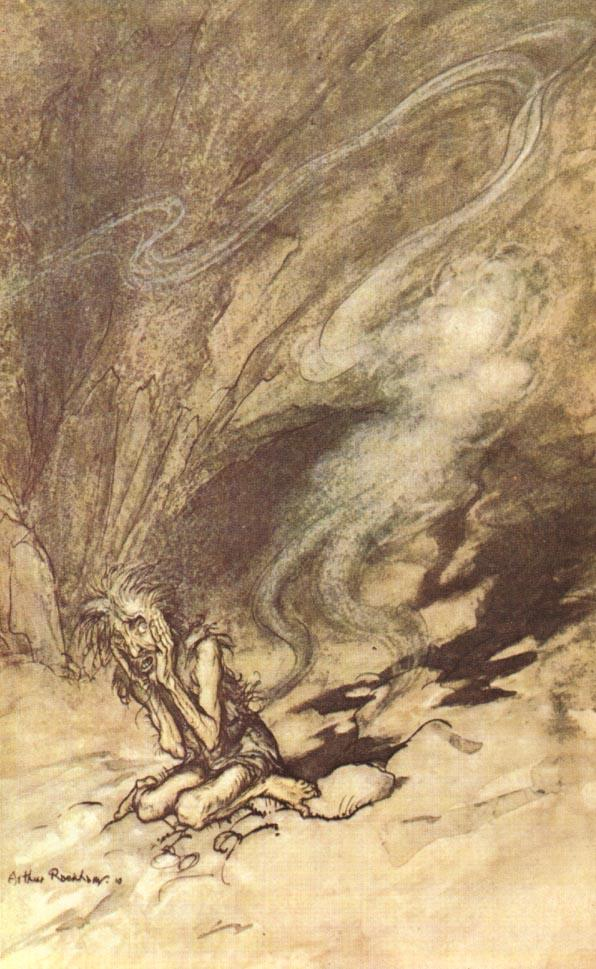
Alberich puts on the Tarnhelm and vanishes; illustration by Arthur Rackham to Richard Wagner's Das Rheingold

The Tarnhelm is a magic helmet in Richard Wagner's Der Ring des Nibelungen (written 1848–1874, first performed 1876). It was crafted by Mime at the demand of his brother Alberich. It is used as a cloak of invisibility by Alberich in Das Rheingold. It also allows one to change one's form:

- Alberich changes to a giant snake and then a toad in Das Rheingold, Scene 3.
- Fafner changes to a dragon after the end of Das Rheingold and appears thus in Siegfried, Act II. (It is never made clear whether Fafner actually used the Tarnhelm to transform, or simply transformed as many giants and gods did in the myths. There is no Tarnhelm present in the original Andvari myth from Reginsmál in the Poetic Edda from which Wagner drew inspiration for this scene.)
- Siegfried changes to Gunther's form in Götterdämmerung Act I, Scene 3.

Finally, it allows one to travel long distances instantly, as Siegfried does in Götterdämmerung, Act II.

The stage directions in Das Rheingold and Siegfried describe the Tarnhelm as a golden chain-mail helmet which covers the wearer's face.

== In popular culture ==
In The Lord of the Rings, Éowyn adopts the name "Dernhelm" when she masquerades as a man before slaying the Witch-King of Angmar; "Dernhelm" is the Old English equivalent of "Tarnhelm."

== See also ==
- Huliðshjálmr (concealing helmet) of Norse dwarves
- Helm of Awe, associated with Fáfnir
