= Paul Kalisch =

German singer (1855–1946)

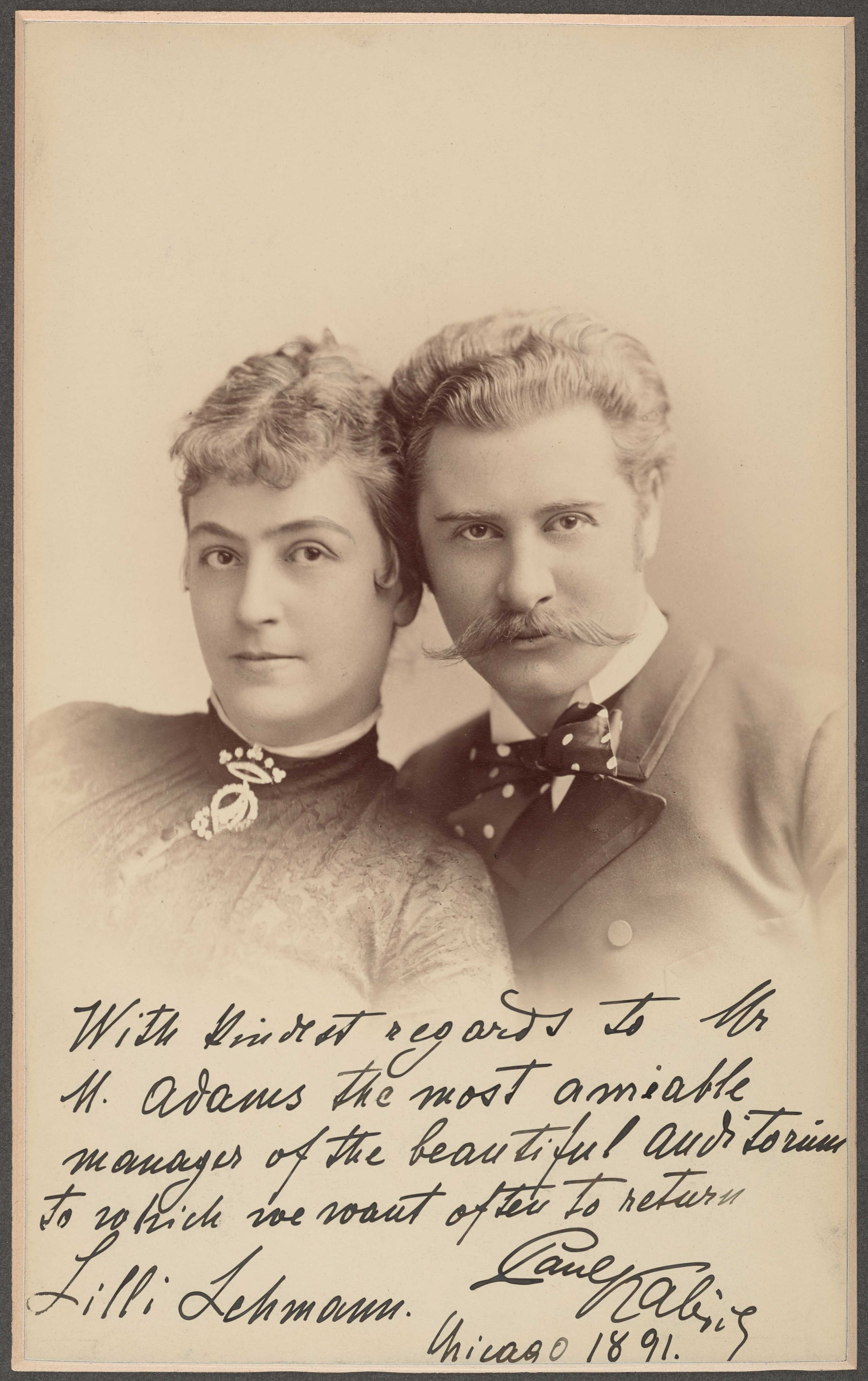
- Lilli Lehmann and Paul Kalisch, c. 1891 (photo by Benjamin Falk; Newberry Library, Chicago)
- Born: 6 November 1855; Berlin, Prussia
- Died: 27 January 1946 (aged 90); St. Lorenz, Upper Austria
- Occupation: Opera singer
- Spouse: Lilli Lehmann (m. 1888; died 1929)
- Parent: David Kalisch

Paul Kalisch (6 November 1855 – 27 January 1946) was a German opera singer (tenor). He was the son of David Kalisch, a Jewish Christian writer, founder of the Kladderadatsch.

== Biography ==
Paul Kalisch was born in Berlin, Prussia on 6 November 1855. He was destined for a career as an architect, but at a gathering at the home of his brother-in-law Paul Lindau, where Kalisch sang a few selections from Schubert and Wagner, his voice so impressed Pollini and Adelina Patti that they urged him to go on the stage. Shortly afterward Kalisch went to Italy to study under Leoni and Lamperti, and he made his debut at Varese in 1880 as Edgardo in Lucia di Lammermoor. After a most successful tour through Italy and Spain he sang in 1883 at the royal operas at Munich, Berlin, and Vienna, and at the Stadttheaters of Hamburg, Leipzig, and Cologne.

He stayed a short time in Germany, and then together with Lilli Lehmann – whom he later married in New York on 24 February 1888 – went to London, where he sang in Tristan und Isolde at Her Majesty's Theatre. From England Kalisch went to the United States, where he spent six winter seasons: four seasons at the Metropolitan Opera House, New York City, while for two seasons he toured the country together with Anton Seidl, singing in many of Wagner's operas. Upon his return to Europe he again toured Germany, and also sang at Vienna, Budapest, Paris, and London; but he achieved his greatest success at the Wiesbadener Festspiele, where he sang before the royal family. He was made Kammersänger by Duke Ernst of Saxe-Coburg. Kalisch's most successful rôles were Jean de Leyde, Eleazar, Otello, Siegmund, Siegfried, Tannhäuser, and Tristan. Kalisch again appeared in Tristan and Isolde at Paris and Cologne in 1901.

He died in St. Lorenz, Upper Austria on 27 January 1946.

== Bibliography of Jewish Encyclopedia ==
- Eisenberg, Biog. Lex

()

By : Isidore Singer & I. George Dobsevage
