= Garven =

Garven is a name. Notable people with the name include:

- James Garven, American finance professor and author
- Kate Garven, Australian actress
- Pierre P. Garven (1925–1973), American judge
- Pierre Prosper Garven (1872–1938), American politician
- Garven Metusala (born 1999), Haitian footballer

== See also ==
- Manitoba Provincial Road 213, a highway in Canada known as Garven Road
- Garvens
