= Friedrich Ebert =

President of Germany from 1919 to 1925

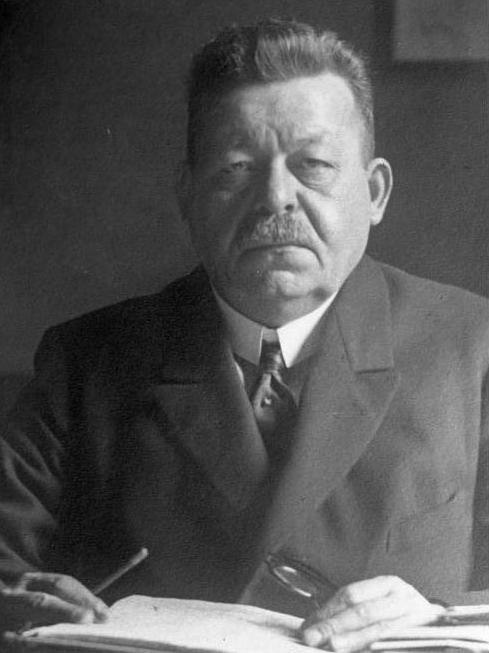
- Ebert in 1925

President of Germany
- In office 11 February 1919 – 28 February 1925
- Minister President (1919): Philipp Scheidemann; Gustav Bauer
- Chancellor (1919–1925): Gustav Bauer; Hermann Müller; Constantin Fehrenbach; Joseph Wirth; Wilhelm Cuno; Gustav Stresemann; Wilhelm Marx; Hans Luther
- Preceded by: Office established Wilhelm II (as Emperor)
- Succeeded by: Hans Luther (acting); Walter Simons (acting); Paul von Hindenburg

Head of the Council of the People's Deputies
- De facto 9 November 1918 – 13 February 1919 Serving with Hugo Haase (until 29 December); Philipp Scheidemann (from 29 December)
- Preceded by: Max von Baden (as Chancellor)
- Succeeded by: Philipp Scheidemann (as Minister President)

Leader of the Social Democratic Party
- In office 20 September 1913 – 15 June 1919
- Preceded by: August Bebel
- Succeeded by: Hermann Müller; Otto Wels

Member of the Reichstag for Düsseldorf 2
- In office 7 February 1912 – 9 November 1918
- Preceded by: Friedrich Linz
- Succeeded by: Constituency abolished

Personal details
- Born: 4 February 1871 Heidelberg, Germany
- Died: 28 February 1925 (aged 54) Berlin, Germany
- Resting place: Bergfriedhof, Heidelberg, Germany
- Party: SPD
- Spouse: Louise Rump (m. 1894)
- Children: 5, including Friedrich Jr.
- Friedrich Ebert's voice Recorded 21 August 1919

Friedrich Ebert ([ˈfʁiːdʁɪç ˈeːbɐt]; 4 February 1871 – 28 February 1925) was a German politician of the Social Democratic Party (SPD) who served as the first president of Germany from 1919 until his death in 1925.

Ebert was elected leader of the SPD on the death in 1913 of August Bebel. In 1914, shortly after he assumed leadership, the party became deeply divided over Ebert's support of war loans to finance the German war effort in World War I. A moderate social democrat, Ebert was in favour of the Burgfrieden, a political policy that sought to suppress discord over domestic issues among political parties to concentrate all forces in society on the conclusion of the war effort. He tried to isolate those in the party opposed to war and advocated a split.

Ebert was a pivotal figure in the German revolution of 1918–1919. When Germany became a republic at the end of World War I, he became its first chancellor. His policies at that time were primarily aimed at restoring justice and order in Germany and suppressing the left. To accomplish these goals, he allied himself with conservative and nationalistic political forces, in particular the leadership of the military under General Wilhelm Groener and the right-wing Freikorps. With their help, the Reich government, which Ebert headed, crushed a number of socialist, communist and anarchist uprisings as well as those from the right, including the Kapp Putsch, a legacy that has made him a controversial historical figure.

== Early life ==
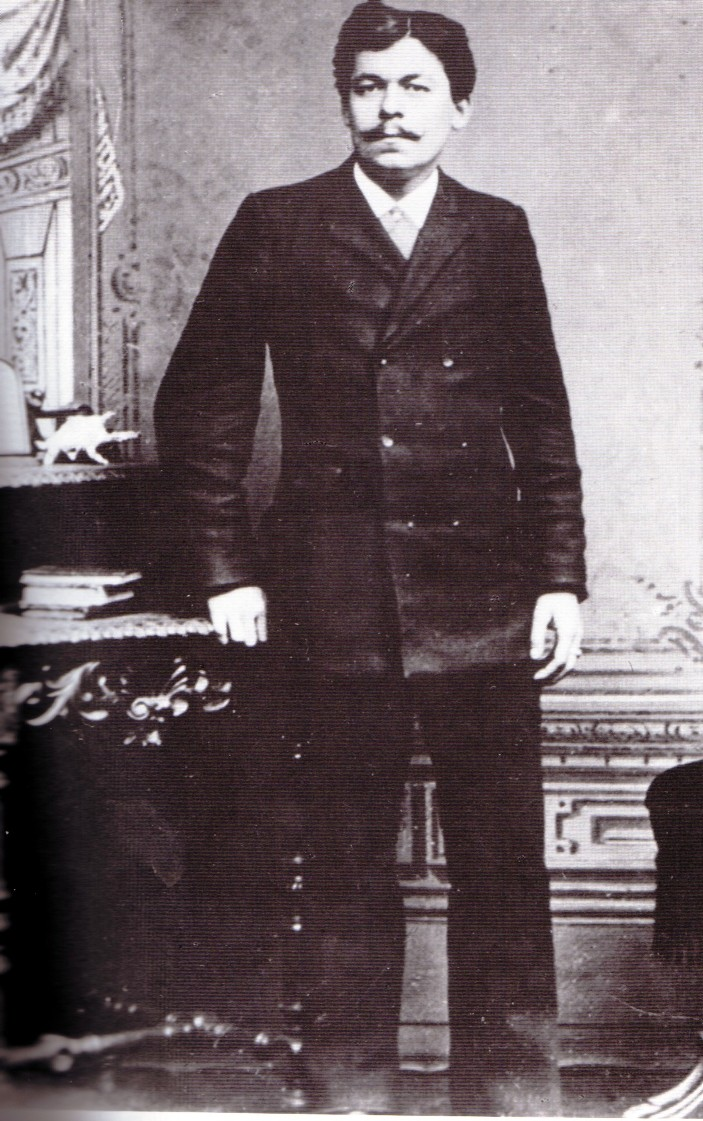
Ebert in 1890

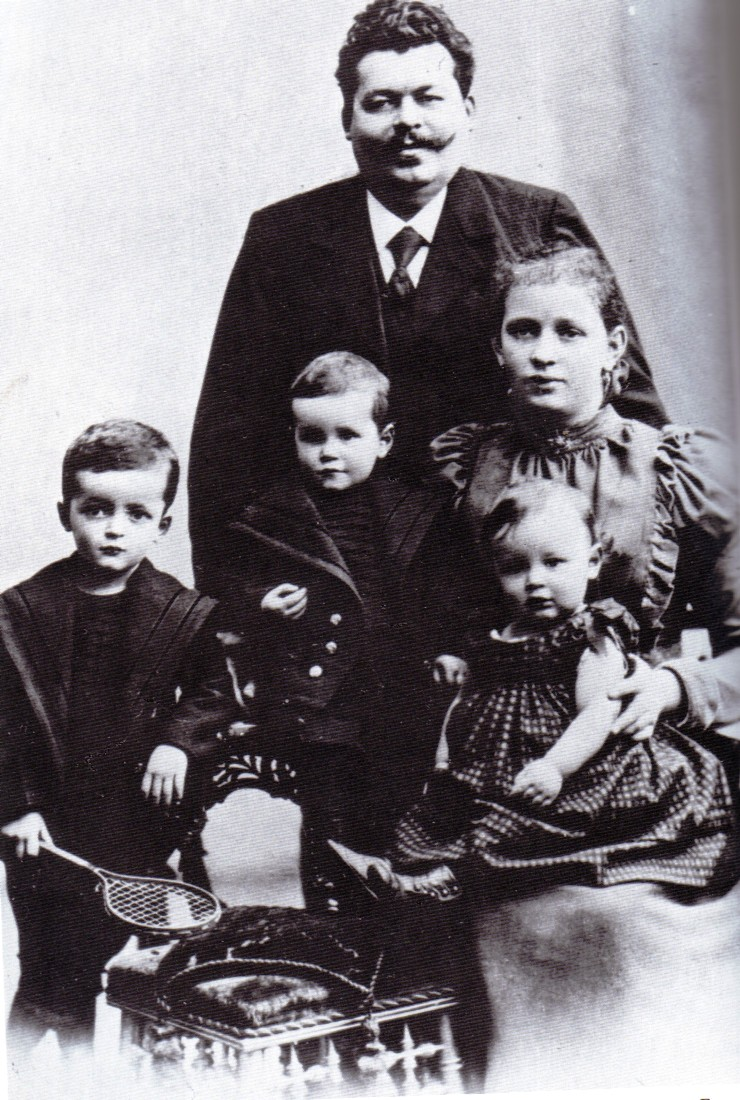
Ebert with his wife Louise and their children, from left to right: Friedrich, Georg and Heinrich (Christmas 1898)

Ebert was born in Heidelberg in the Grand Duchy of Baden, on 4 February 1871, shortly after the creation of the German Empire, the seventh of nine children of the tailor Karl Ebert (1834–1892) and his wife Katharina (née Hinkel; 1834–1897). Three of his siblings died at a young age. Although he wanted to attend university, this proved impossible due to his family's lack of funds. Instead, he trained as a saddle-maker from 1885 to 1888. After he became a journeyman in 1889, he travelled, according to the German custom, from place to place in Germany, seeing the country and learning fresh details of his trade. In Mannheim, he was introduced by an uncle to the Social Democratic Party, joining it in 1889. Although Ebert studied the writings of Karl Marx and Friedrich Engels, he was less interested in ideology than in practical and organisational issues that would improve the lot of the workers then and there. Ebert was placed on a police "black list" due to his political activities, so he kept changing his place of residence. Between 1889 and 1891, he lived in Kassel, Braunschweig, Elberfeld-Barmen, Remscheid, Quakenbrück and Bremen, where he founded and chaired local chapters of the Association of Saddlers.

After settling in Bremen in 1891, Ebert made a living doing odd jobs. In 1893, he obtained an editorial post on the socialist Bremer Bürgerzeitung. In May 1894, he married Louise Rump (1873–1955), daughter of a manual labourer, who had been employed as a housemaid and in labelling boxes and who was active in union work. He then became a pub owner that became a centre of socialist and union activity and was elected party chairman of the Bremen SPD. In 1900, Ebert was appointed a union secretary and elected a member of the Bremer Bürgerschaft (city and state assembly) as the representative of the Social Democratic Party. In 1904, Ebert presided over the national convention of the party in Bremen and became better known to a wider public. He became a leader of the "moderate" wing of the Social Democratic Party and, in 1905, Secretary-General of the SPD, at which point he moved to Berlin. At the time, he was the youngest member of the party executive.

Meanwhile, Ebert had run for a seat in the Reichstag (parliament of Germany) several times in constituencies where the SPD had no chance of winning: 1898 Vechta (Oldenburg), 1903 and 1906 Stade (Province of Hanover). However, in 1912, he was elected to the Reichstag for the constituency of Elberfeld-Barmen (today part of Wuppertal). This was the election that also made the SPD the strongest party in the Reichstag with 110 out of a total of 397 members, surpassing the Centre Party. On the death of August Bebel on 13 August 1913, Ebert was elected as joint party chairman at the convention in Jena on 20 September with 433 out of 473 votes. His co-chairman was Hugo Haase.

== World War I ==
When the July Crisis of 1914 erupted, Ebert was on vacation. After the war was declared in early August, Ebert travelled to Zurich with party treasurer Otto Braun and the SPD's money to be in a position to build up a foreign organisation if the SPD should be outlawed in the German Empire. He returned on 6 August and led the SPD Reichstag members to vote almost unanimously in favour of war loans, accepting that the war was a necessary patriotic, defensive measure, especially against the autocratic regime of the Tsar in Russia. In January 1916, Haase resigned. Under the leadership of Ebert and other "moderates" such as Philipp Scheidemann, the SPD party participated in the Burgfrieden, an agreement among the political parties in the Reichstag to suppress domestic policy differences for the duration of the war to concentrate the energies of the country solely on bringing the conflict to a successful conclusion for Germany. This positioned the party in favour of the war with the aim of a compromise peace, a stance that eventually led to a split in the SPD, with those radically opposed to the war leaving the SPD in early 1917 to form the Independent Social Democratic Party of Germany, or USPD. Similar policy disputes caused Ebert to end his parliamentary alliance with several left-wing members of the Reichstag and start to work closely with the Centre Party and the Progress Party in 1916. Later those kicked out by Ebert called themselves "Spartacists".

Beginning in 1916, Ebert shared the leadership of his Reichstag delegates with Scheidemann. Although he opposed a policy of territorial gains secured through military conquest on the western front (aside from Luxembourg, which was German speaking and could be easily incorporated), Ebert supported the war effort overall as a defensive struggle. Ebert experienced the traumatic loss of having two of his four sons killed in the war: Heinrich died in February 1917 in Macedonia, whereas Georg was killed in action in May 1917 in France. In June 1917, a delegation of social democrats led by Ebert travelled to Stockholm for talks with socialists from other countries about a conference that would have sought to end the war without any annexations of territory on the western front except for Luxembourg and giving back most of Alsace and Lorraine with blessings from the German government. The initiative failed, however.

In January 1918, when the workers in munition factories in Berlin went on strike, Ebert joined the strike leadership but worked hard to get the strikers back to work. He was pilloried by some from the left as a "traitor to the working class" and by others from the right as a "traitor to the fatherland".

== Revolution of 1918–1919 ==
=== Parliamentarisation ===
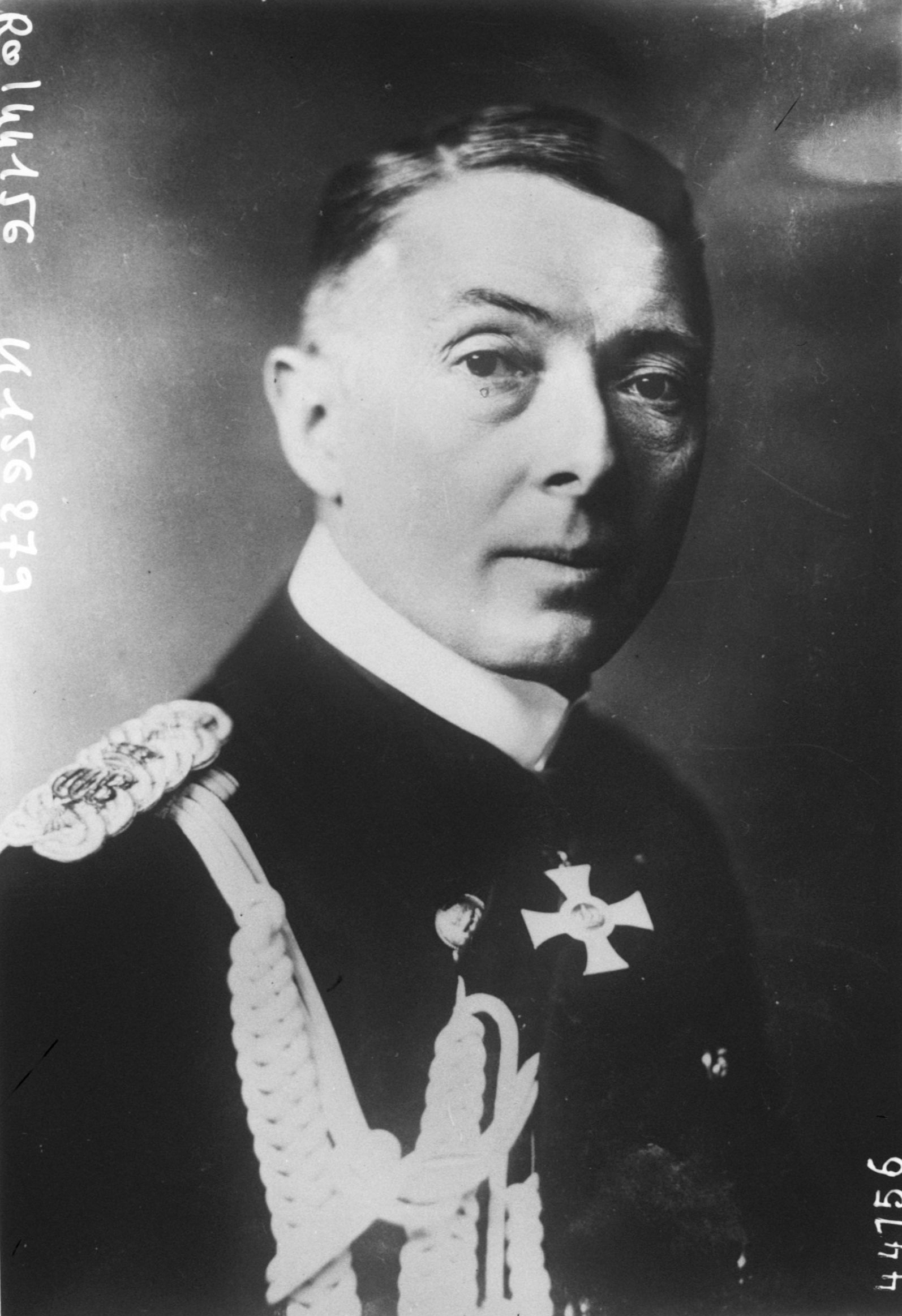
Paul von Hintze in 1915

When it became clear that the war was lost in late summer and fall of 1918, First Quartermaster general Erich Ludendorff of the military Supreme Command (OHL), pushed for the "parliamentarisation" of the German Empire, i.e. a transfer of power to those parties that held the majority in the Reichstag (SPD, Centre Party and Progress Party). The goal was to shift the blame for the military defeat from the OHL to the politicians of the majority parties.

On 29 September 1918, Ludendorff suddenly informed Paul von Hintze, the German Foreign Minister, that the Western Front could collapse at any moment and that a ceasefire had to be negotiated without delay. However, he suggested that the request for the ceasefire should come from a new government sanctioned by the Reichstag majority. In his view, a "revolution from above" was needed. Chancellor Georg von Hertling and Emperor Wilhelm II agreed, although the former resigned. Scheidemann and a majority of SPD deputies were opposed to joining "a bankrupt enterprise", but Ebert convinced his party, arguing that "we must throw ourselves into the breach" and "it is our damned duty to do it". In early October, the Emperor appointed a liberal, Prince Maximilian of Baden, as chancellor to lead peace negotiations with the Allies. The new government for the first time included ministers from the SPD: Philipp Scheidemann and Gustav Bauer. The request for a ceasefire went out on 4 October. On 5 October, the government informed the German public about these events. However, there was then a delay, as the American President Wilson initially refused to agree to the ceasefire. His diplomatic notes seemed to indicate that the changes to the German government were insufficient and the fact that Wilhelm II remained head of state was a particular obstacle. Ebert did not favour exchanging the monarchy for a republic, but like many others, he was worried about the danger of a socialist revolution, which seemed more likely with every day that passed. On 28 October, the constitution was changed to make the chancellor dependent on the confidence of the Reichstag rather than the emperor. At that point, the majority parties of the Reichstag, including Ebert's SPD, were quite satisfied with the state of affairs; what they wanted was a period of calm to deal with the issue of negotiating an armistice and a peace treaty.

=== November Revolution ===
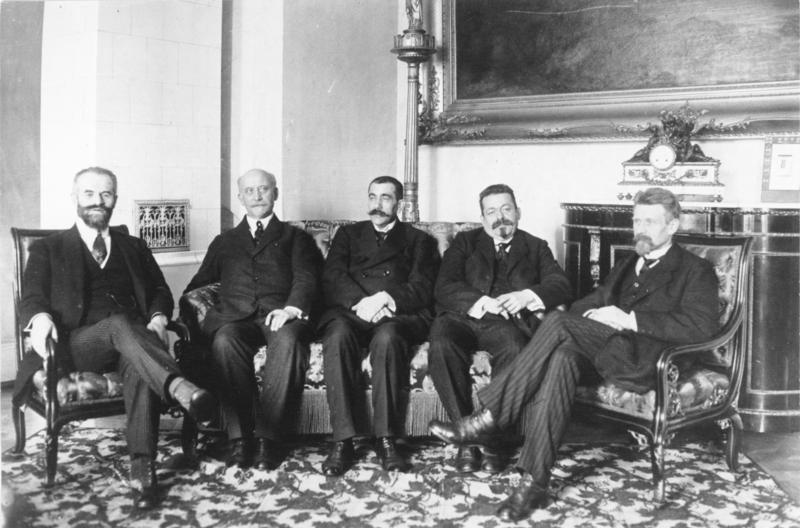
People's Deputies Otto Landsberg, Philipp Scheidemann, Gustav Noske, Friedrich Ebert and Rudolf Wissell after the USPD had left the Council at the end of 1918

The plans of the new German government were thrown into disarray when a confrontation between officers and crews on board the German fleet at Wilhelmshaven on 30 October set in motion a train of events that would result in the German Revolution of 1918–1919 that spread over a substantial part of the country over the next week. Against that backdrop, the SPD led by Ebert on 7 November demanded a more powerful voice in the cabinet, an extension of parliamentarism to Prussia and the renunciation of the throne by both the Emperor and his oldest son, Crown Prince Wilhelm. Ebert had favoured retaining the monarchy under a different ruler, but told Prince Max von Baden, "If the Emperor does not abdicate, the social revolution is inevitable. But I do not want it, I even hate it like sin." On the left, the Spartacists (numbering around 100 in Berlin) and a group of around 80 to 100 popular labour leaders from Berlin known as Revolutionary Stewards prepared for a communist revolution in the capital.

On 9 November, the revolution reached Berlin as the larger companies were hit by a general strike called by the Spartacists and the Revolutionary Stewards, but also supported by the SPD and the mainstream unions. Workers' and soldiers' councils were created, and important buildings occupied. As the striking masses marched on the centre of Berlin, the SPD, afraid of losing its influence on the revolution, announced that it was resigning from the government of Prince Max.

Meanwhile, Prince Maximilian of Baden had failed to convince Emperor Wilhelm II, who was at the army headquarters at Spa, Belgium, of the need to abdicate. Wilhelm had resigned himself to the loss of the imperial crown, but still thought he could remain king of Prussia. However, under the imperial constitution, the imperial crown was tied to the Prussian crown. When Maximilian failed to convince him of the unreality of giving up one crown and not the other, he unilaterally and untruthfully announced that Wilhelm had in fact abdicated both titles and that the Crown Prince had agreed to relinquish his right of succession. The following morning Wilhelm went into exile the Netherlands, where he signed a formal abdication statement on 28 November.

Shortly after Prince Maximilian's announcement, the SPD leadership arrived at the chancellery and Ebert asked the chancellor to hand over the government to him. After a short meeting of the cabinet, Prince Max resigned and, in an unconstitutional move because only the emperor could appoint a chancellor, handed his office over to Ebert, who thus became chancellor of Germany and Minister President of Prussia. He was the first socialist, the second politician and the second commoner to hold either office. Ebert left the government of Prince Maximilian mostly unchanged but appointed SPD members as Prussian Minister of War and military commander of the Berlin area.

Ebert's first action as chancellor was to issue a series of proclamations asking the people to remain calm, stay out of the streets and to restore peace and order. It failed to work. Ebert then had lunch with Scheidemann at the Reichstag and, when given the opportunity to do so, refused to speak to the masses gathered outside. Scheidemann, however, seized upon the opportunity, and in hopes of forestalling whatever the Communist leader Karl Liebknecht planned to tell his followers at the former royal palace, proclaimed Germany a republic. A furious Ebert promptly reproached him: "You have no right to proclaim the Republic!" By this, he meant that the decision on the form of government was to be left to an elected national assembly. Later that day, Ebert asked Prince Max to stay on as regent, but he was refused.

An entirely socialist provisional government based on workers' and soldiers' councils was about to take power under Ebert's leadership. It was called the Council of the People's Deputies. Ebert found himself in a quandary. He had succeeded in bringing the SPD to power, and he was in a position to put into law social reforms and improve the lot of the working class. Yet as a result of the revolution, he and his party were forced to share power with those on the left with whom he fundamentally disagreed: the Spartacists and the Independent Social Democrats (USPD). In the afternoon of 9 November, he grudgingly asked the USPD to nominate three ministers for the future government. That evening, a group of several hundred followers of the Revolutionary Stewards occupied the Reichstag building and held an impromptu debate. They called for the election of workers' and soldiers' councils the next day, with an eye to naming a provisional government. In order to keep control of events and against his own anti-revolutionary convictions, Ebert decided that he needed to control the workers' councils and thus become the leader of the revolution while at the same time serving as the formal head of the German government.

On 10 November, the SPD, led by Ebert, managed to ensure that a majority of the newly elected workers' and soldiers' councils came from among their own supporters. Meanwhile, the USPD agreed to work with him and share power in the Council of the People's Deputies, the new revolutionary government. Ebert announced the pact between the two socialist parties to the assembled councils, who were eager for a unified socialist front and approved the parity of three members each coming from SPD and USPD. Ebert and Haase (USPD) were to be the joint chairmen. The same day, Ebert received a telephone call from OHL chief of staff Wilhelm Groener, who offered to cooperate with him. According to Groener, he promised Ebert the loyalty of the military in exchange for some demands: that Ebert fight Bolshevism, end the system of workers' and soldiers' councils, call a national assembly and return the country to a state of law and order. In return, Ebert promised that command of the troops would stay with the officer corps. Hindenburg remained head of the OHL to ensure an orderly return of the army. This initiated a regular communication between the two that involved daily telephone conversations over a secret line, according to Groener. The agreement between the two became known as the Ebert–Groener pact.

In domestic policy, a number of social reforms were quickly introduced by the Council of the People's Deputies under Ebert's leadership, including unemployment benefits, the eight-hour workday, universal suffrage for everyone over the age of 20, the right of farmhands to organise, and increases in workers' old-age, sick and unemployment benefits.

=== Violence in Berlin ===
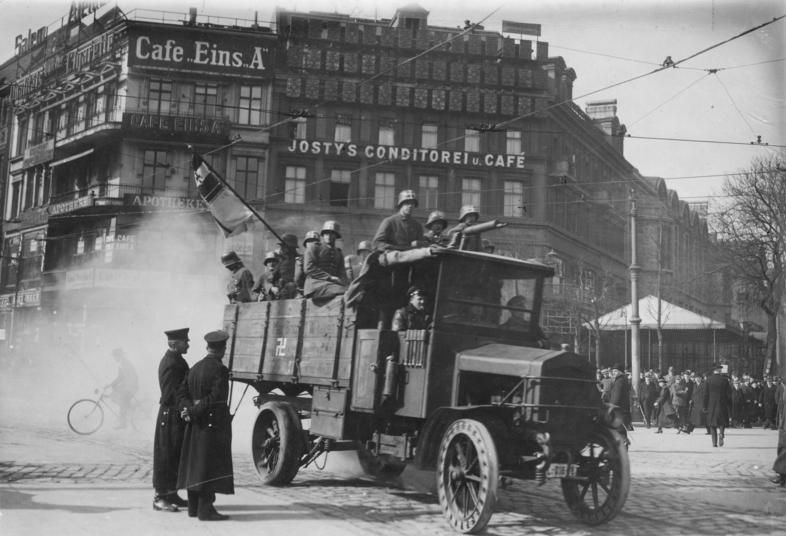
Freikorps supporting the Kapp Putsch in March 1920, at Potsdamer Platz, Berlin

In the turbulent early weeks of the revolution, Ebert and the leadership of the SPD sided with the conservative and nationalistic elements in German society (civil servants, armed forces, police, judiciary) against the forces that wanted a more radical revolution. The majority of the members of the workers' and soldiers' councils also viewed themselves as supporters of the government rather than of the Spartacists, the only group that wanted a dictatorship of the workers. Ebert and Groener worked out a plan to restore order in Berlin by having army units returning from the Western Front move in and disarm all paramilitary forces from 10 to 15 December 1918. In a speech to the returning troops, Ebert told them in words that "appeared to justify the stab-in-the-back myth":

No enemy has overcome you. It was only when the superior numbers of our opponents in men and material became increasingly oppressive that we gave up the fight. And it was precisely in view of your heroic courage that it was our duty not to call for further futile sacrifices from you [...] You will not find our state as you left it. Something new has emerged: German freedom has arisen. The old rule, which lay like a curse on our actions, has been shaken off by the German people. They have made themselves masters of their own destiny. Above all, the hopes of German freedom rest on you [...] No one suffered more than you from the injustice of the old regime. We thought of you when we did away with a disastrous system; we fought for freedom for you; we won the right to work for you.

After the ten divisions had arrived, however, rather than remaining as a cohesive force, they dispersed to their homes.

On 16 December, the Reich Congress of Workers' and Soldiers' Councils met in Berlin and set the date for elections to the National Assembly for 19 January 1919. It also passed a resolution that was aimed at ensuring that the military would be under the strict control of the civilian government and called for a powerful position of the soldiers' councils vis-à-vis the professional officer corps. This was unacceptable to the leaders of the military, and the OHL began to establish volunteer regiments in the Berlin area.

Fighting erupted on 24 December 1918 in central Berlin. Today, this episode is known as the 1918 Christmas crisis. On 23 December, dissatisfied members of the revolutionary People's Navy Division occupied the chancellery and put the People's Deputies under house arrest. Ebert asked the OHL for help over the phone, and troops assembled on the outskirts of the capital. During the night, Ebert ordered the troops to attack, which they did on the morning of 24 December. When the fighting stopped in the afternoon, the People's Navy forces held the field, and they returned to their barracks, ending the crisis. As a result of the event, which Karl Liebknecht called "Ebert's Bloody Christmas" because it had cost 67 lives, the USPD members left the Council of the People's Deputies on 29 December. The next day, SPD members Gustav Noske and Rudolf Wissell took their place, and from that point on, government communiques were signed Reichsregierung (i.e. federal government) instead of "Council of the Peoples' Deputies". At the same time, the Spartacists severed their remaining links with the USPD and set themselves up as the Communist Party of Germany (KPD).

On 5 January 1919, the USPD and KPD called for demonstrations to protest the dismissal of the head of the Berlin police, who was a USPD member, for supporting the revolutionary sailors during the Christmas uprising. The demonstration grew into the Spartacist uprising, which had the goal of replacing the national government with a council republic. After Ebert's negotiations with the insurgents broke down, his major concern was with maintaining internal peace. He ordered the rebellion to be quashed, and Gustav Noske, who was in charge of the Army and Navy, used both regular forces and Freikorps units to bring the uprising to an end. Around 170 people lost their lives, including KPD leaders Rosa Luxemburg and Karl Liebknecht, who were murdered extrajudicially by the Freikorps.

== President of Germany (1919–1925) ==
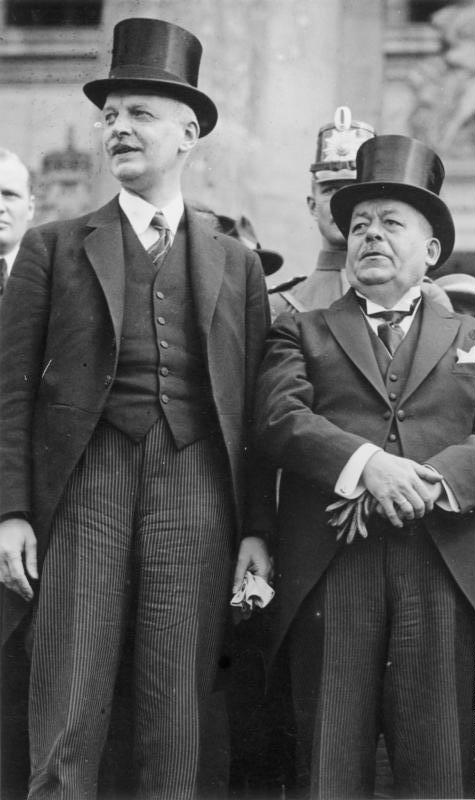
Ebert, right, with Chancellor Wilhelm Cuno (1923)

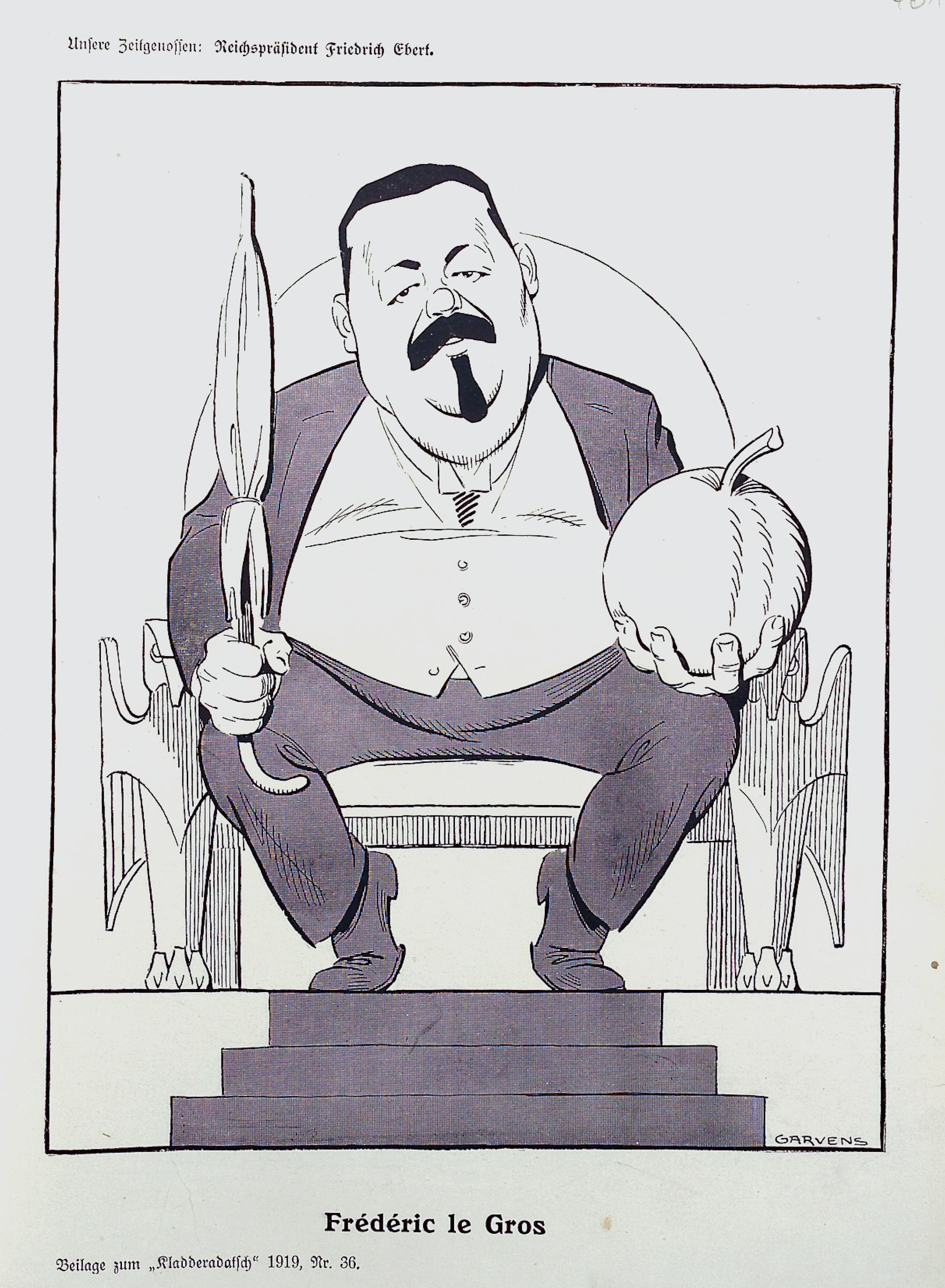
Ebert caricatured by Oskar Garvens as "Frederic le Gros" in the nationalist magazine Kladderdatsch, 1919

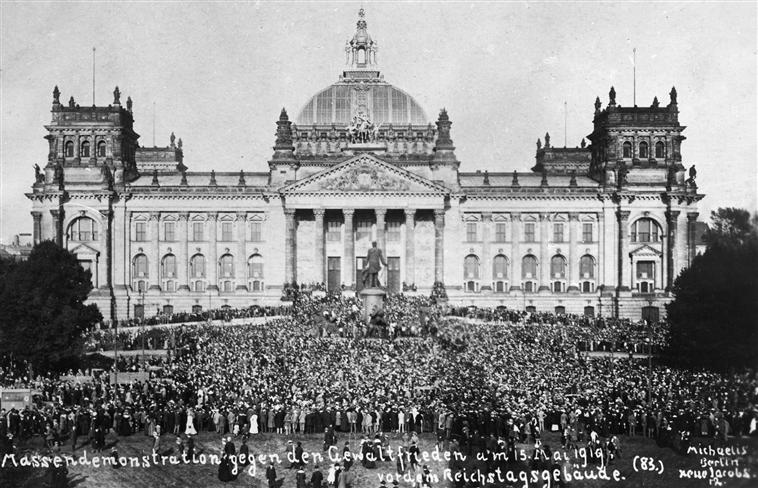
Demonstration against the Treaty of Versailles in front of the Reichstag, 15 May 1919

In the first German presidential election, held on 11 February 1919, five days after the National Assembly convened in Weimar, Ebert was elected provisional president of the German Republic by the members of the assembly. He remained in the position after the new constitution came into force and was sworn in as president of Germany on 21 August 1919. He was Germany's first-ever democratically elected head of state, and was also the first commoner, the first social democrat, the first civilian, and the first person from a proletarian background to hold the position. In the life of the unified German Reich from 1871 to 1945, he was also the only head of state who was unequivocally committed to democracy.

One of Ebert's first tasks as president was to deal with the Treaty of Versailles. When the treaty's terms became public on 7 May 1919, it was cursed by Germans of all political shades as an onerous "dictated peace", particularly because Germany had essentially been handed the treaty and told to sign without any negotiations. Ebert himself denounced the treaty as "unrealisable and unbearable". However, Ebert was well aware of the possibility that Germany would not be in a position to reject the treaty. He believed that the Allies would invade Germany from the west if Germany refused to sign. To appease public opinion, he asked Hindenburg if the army was capable of holding out if the Allies renewed hostilities. He promised to urge rejection of the treaty if there was even the remote possibility that the army could make a stand. Hindenburg, with some prodding from Groener, concluded that the army was not capable of resuming the war even on a limited scale. Rather than tell Ebert himself, he dispatched Groener to telephone the Army's conclusion to the president. The National Assembly approved the treaty by a large majority on 24 June.

The government's fight against communist forces and recalcitrant socialists went on after Ebert became president. From January to May 1919, in some areas through the summer, violence continued. Since the 19 January elections had returned a solid majority for the democratic parties (SPD, Centre, and DDP), Ebert felt that the revolutionary forces had no legitimacy left. The individual workers' and soldiers' councils across Germany had dissolved by late in the autumn of 1919.

In March 1920, during the right-wing Kapp Putsch instigated by parts of the Reichswehr, some Freikorps units plus nationalist and monarchist elements, the government, including Ebert, had to flee Berlin. However, a refusal by civil servants to accept the self-declared government and a general strike called by the legitimate cabinet led to the collapse of the putsch. After it ended, striking workers in the Ruhr region refused to return to work. Led by members of the USPD and KPD, they presented an armed challenge to the authority of the government. It then sent Reichswehr and Freikorps troops to quell the Ruhr uprising by force.

To avoid an election campaign at a critical time, the Reichstag extended Ebert's term of office on 24 October 1922 until 30 June 1925, with a majority vote that was sufficient for a change to the constitution.

As president, Ebert appointed centre-right figures like Wilhelm Cuno and Hans Luther chancellor and made rigorous use of his wide-ranging powers under Article 48 of the Weimar constitution. For instance, he used it to deal with the Kapp Putsch and the Beer Hall Putsch. Through 1924, he used the presidency's emergency powers a total of 134 times.

== Death and funeral ==
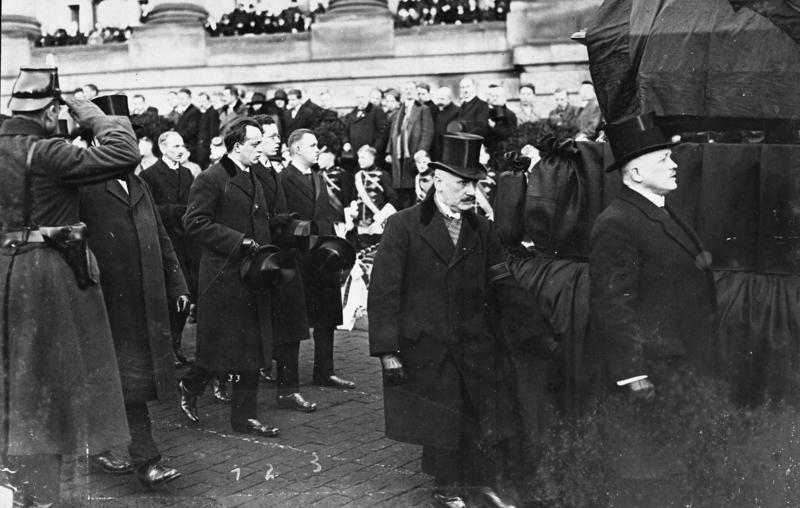
Ebert's funeral

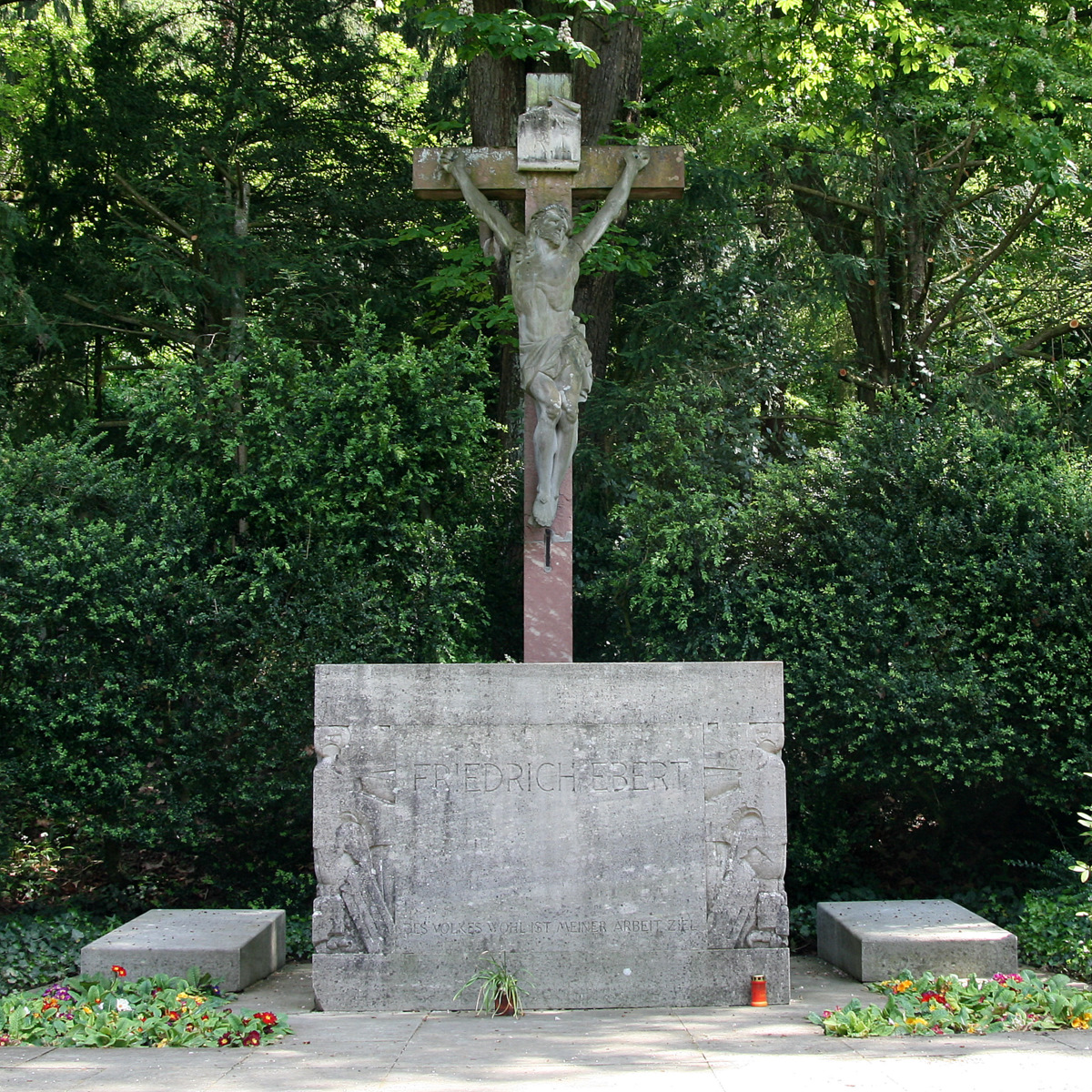
Ebert's tomb in Heidelberg

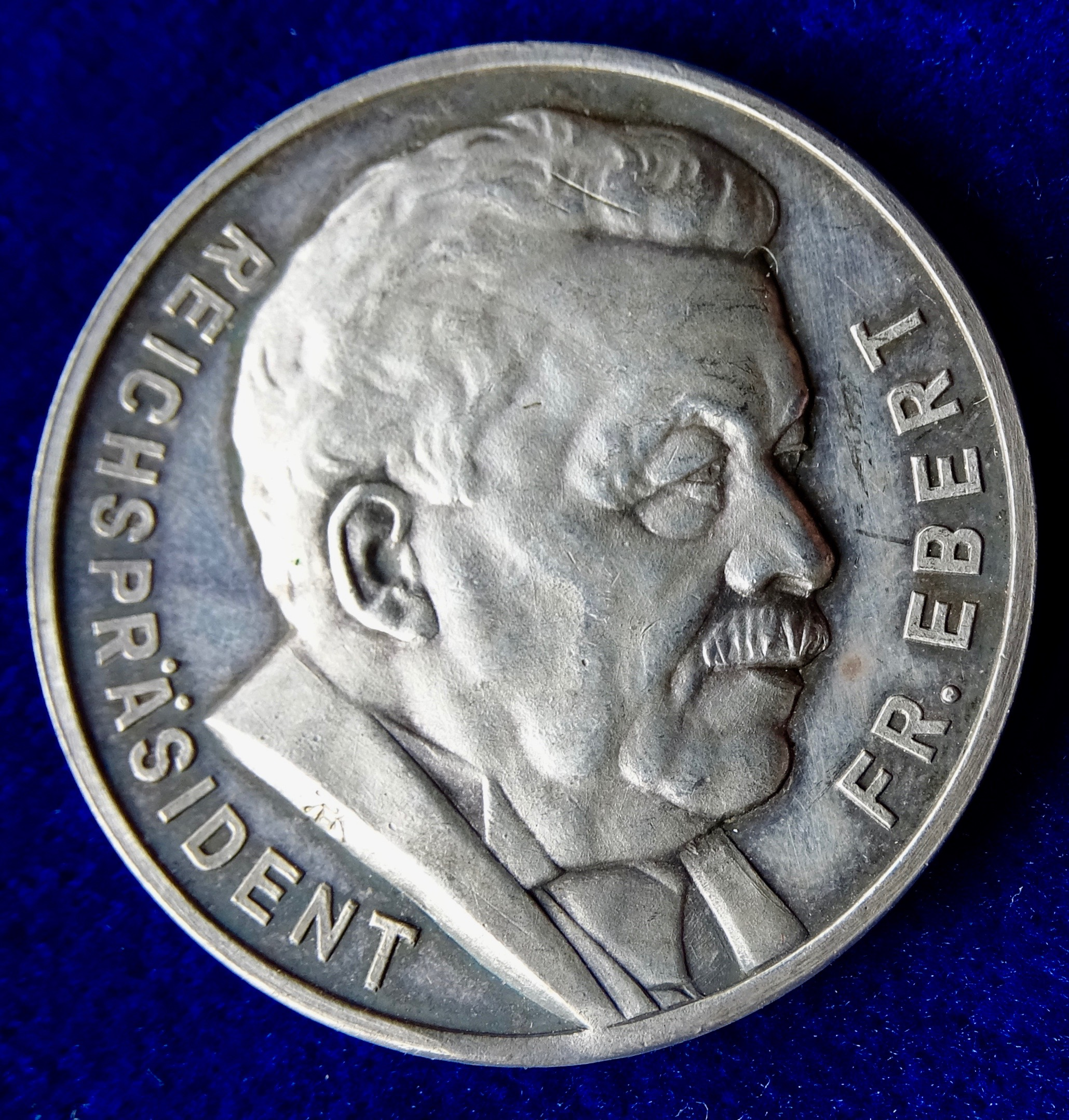
Memorial medal of the first President of Germany by August Hummel 1925, obverse

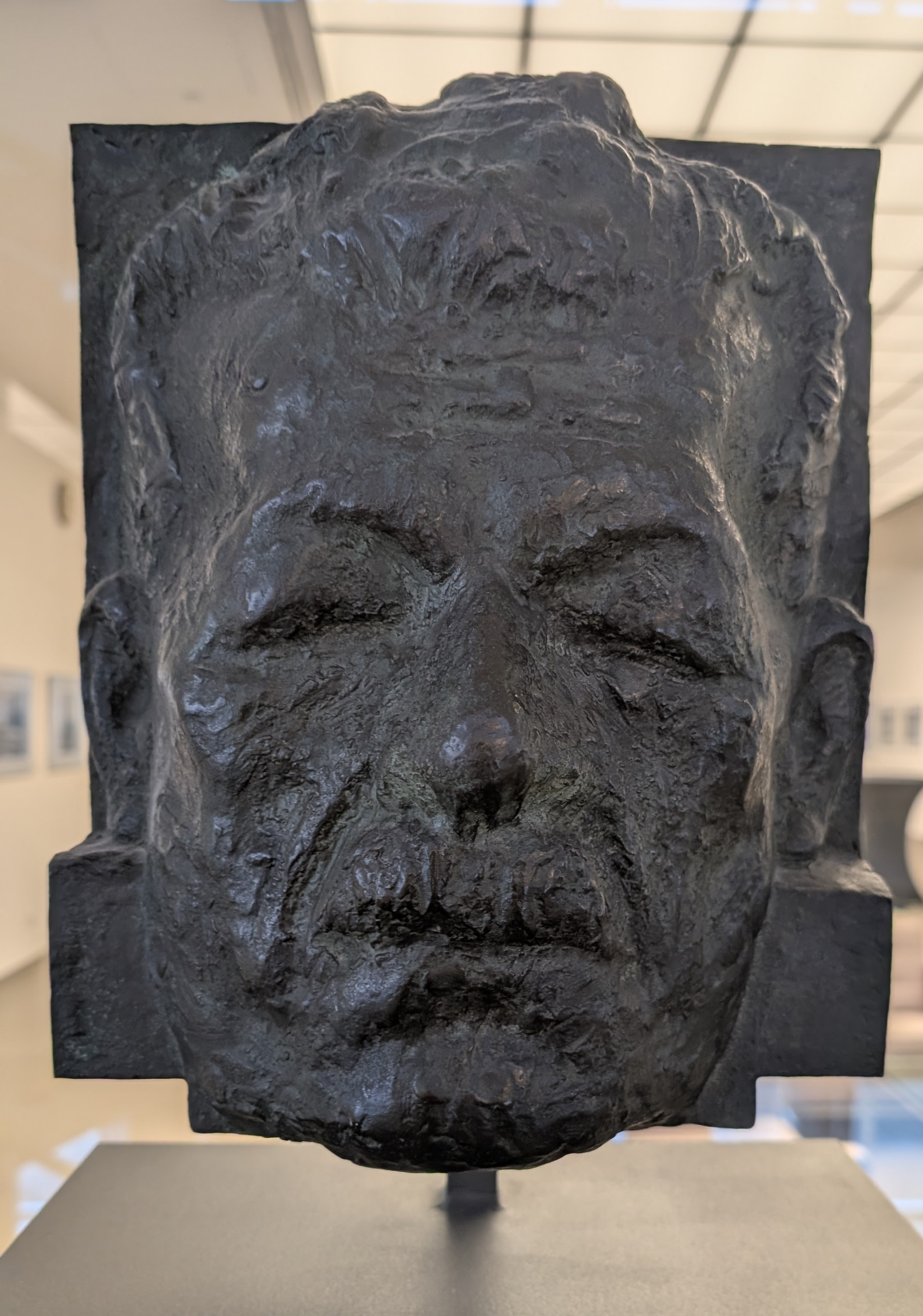
Death mask Friedrich Ebert

Ebert suffered from gallstones and frequent bouts of cholecystitis. Vicious attacks by Ebert's right-wing adversaries, including slander and ridicule, were often condoned or even supported by the judiciary when Ebert sought redress through the court system. The constant necessity to defend himself against those attacks also undermined his health. In December 1924, a court in Magdeburg fined a journalist who had called Ebert a "traitor to his country" for his role in the January 1918 strike, but the court also said that, in terms of strict legalism, Ebert had in fact committed treason. These proceedings prevented him from seeking medical help for a while, as he wanted to be available to give evidence.

Ebert became acutely ill in mid-February 1925 from what was first believed to be influenza. His condition deteriorated over the following two weeks, and at that time, he was thought to be suffering from another episode of gallbladder disease. He became acutely septic on the night of 23 February and underwent an emergency appendectomy (which was performed by August Bier) in the early hours of the following day for what turned out to be appendicitis. Four days later, he died of septic shock, aged 54.

He was succeeded in office first by Chancellor Hans Luther (until 12 March) and then by Walter Simons, both of them on an acting basis, until Paul von Hindenburg became President of Germany on 12 May following his victory in the special presidential election.

Ebert was buried in Heidelberg. Several high-ranking politicians and a trade union leader made speeches at his funeral, as did a Protestant minister, Hermann Maas, pastor at the Church of the Holy Spirit in Heidelberg (which until the 1930s was used by both Lutheran and Catholic congregations). By thus taking part in the obsequies, Maas caused something of a scandal in his church and among political conservatives, because Ebert had been an atheist (although he was baptised a Catholic, he had officially abandoned Christian observance many years before his last illness).

== Historical evaluation ==
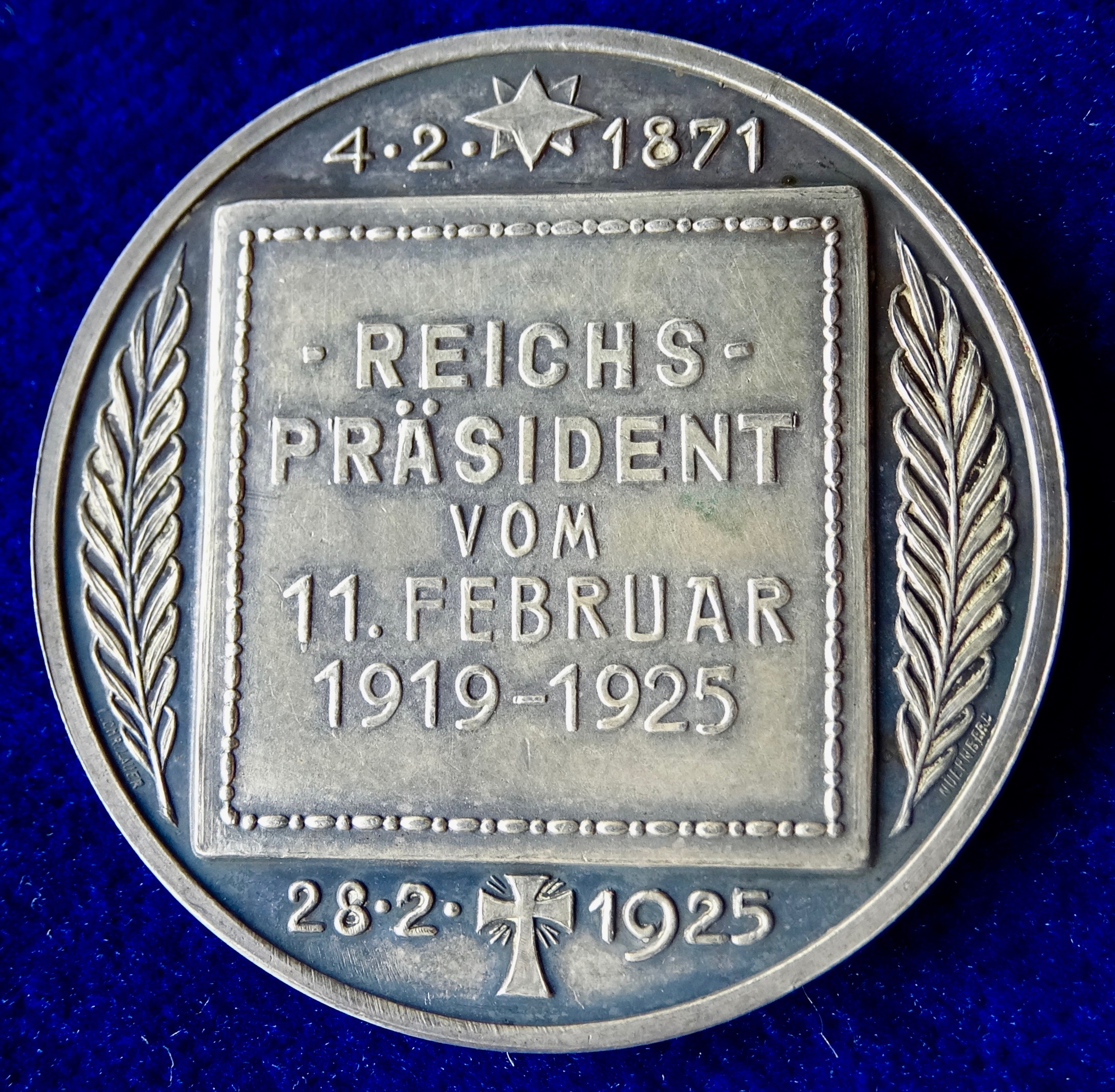
The reverse of Silver Medal showing the dates of his birth and of his death, by August Hummel, 1925

Some historians have defended Ebert's actions as unfortunate but inevitable if the creation of a socialist state on the model that had been promoted by Rosa Luxemburg, Karl Liebknecht and the communist Spartacus League was to be prevented. German historians who had lived through the Weimar Republic, including Sebastian Haffner, later argued that organised communism was not politically relevant in Germany at the time. The tolerance of Ebert and his minister of Defence Gustav Noske with regards to violence on German streets, so long as the pro-government Freikorps were involved, has been detailed by historians in the context of increasing support for fascist ideas.

Friedrich Ebert is credited with founding the German Republic between February and August 1919 in Weimar, quite deliberately so that the other nation states knew there was a Germany not devoted to militarism. As historians have stressed, Weimar in Thuringia did provide parliamentarians with security assurance that Berlin could not provide. Friedrich Ebert linked the "spirit of Weimar" with building "the new Germany". Ebert's social democrat comrade Philipp Scheidemann agreed, pointing out that Weimar was the "city of Goethe". Ebert formed the Weimar Republic government with three Social Democratic Party of Germany (SPD) and three Independent Social Democratic Party of Germany (USPD) ministers. Shop stewards reconvened the workers' councils (Räte) at a congress in Berlin and declared that Ebert's government was merely a Council of People's Commissioners answerable to the workers' councils. Historians emphasise that Ebert was only able to end the state of emergency in Germany by granting all political offenders an amnesty.

In Ebert's opinion, only "reforms", not a revolution, could advance the causes of democracy and socialism. He, therefore, has been called a traitor by leftists, who argue that he paved the way for the ascendancy of the far right and even of Adolf Hitler. Liberals and conservatives, who think his policies were justified, claim that he saved Germany from Soviet excesses.

== Literature ==
- Wolfgang Abendroth: "Friedrich Ebert". In: Wilhelm von Sternburg: Die deutschen Kanzler. Von Bismarck bis Kohl. Aufbau-Taschenbuch-Verlag, Berlin 1998, ISBN 3746680328, pp. 145–159.
- Friedrich Ebert. Sein Leben, sein Werk, seine Zeit. Begleitband zur ständigen Ausstellung in der Reichspräsident-Friedrich-Ebert-Gedenkstätte, edited by Walter Mühlhausen. Kehrer Verlag, Heidelberg 1999, ISBN 3933257034.
- Köhler, Henning: Deutschland auf dem Weg zu sich selbst. Eine Jahrhundertgeschichte. Hohenheim Verlag, Stuttgart/Leipzig 2002, ISBN 3898500578.
- Eberhard Kolb (ed.): Friedrich Ebert als Reichspräsident – Amtsführung und Amtsverständnis. Oldenbourg Wissenschaftsverlag, München 1997, ISBN 3486561073. Containing:
  - Richter, Ludwig: Der Reichspräsident bestimmt die Politik und der Reichskanzler deckt sie: Friedrich Ebert und die Bildung der Weimarer Koalition.
  - Mühlhausen, Walter: Das Büro des Reichspräsidenten in der politischen Auseinandersetzung.
  - Kolb, Eberhard: Vom "vorläufigen" zum definitiven Reichspräsidenten. Die Auseinandersetzung um die "Volkswahl" des Reichspräsidenten 1919–1922.
  - Braun, Bernd: Integration Kraft Repräsentation – Der Reichspräsident in den Ländern.
  - Hürten, Heinz: Reichspräsident und Wehrpolitik. Zur Praxis der Personalauslese.
  - Richter, Ludwig: Das präsidiale Notverordnungsrecht in den ersten Jahren der Weimarer Republik. Friedrich Ebert und die Anwendung des Artikels 48 der Weimarer Reichsverfassung.
  - Mühlhausen, Walter: Reichspräsident und Sozialdemokratie: Friedrich Ebert und seine Partei 1919–1925.
- Georg Kotowski (1959). "Friedrich Ebert". Neue Deutsche Biographie (in German). Vol. 4. Berlin: Duncker & Humblot. pp. 254–256. (full text online).
- Mühlhausen, Walter: Friedrich Ebert 1871–1925. Reichspräsident der Weimarer Republik. Dietz, Bonn 2006, ISBN 3801241645. (Rezension von Michael Epkenhans In: Die Zeit. 1 February 2007)
- Mühlhausen, Walter: Die Republik in Trauer. Der Tod des ersten Reichspräsidenten Friedrich Ebert. Stiftung Reichspräsident-Friedrich-Ebert-Gedenkstätte, Heidelberg 2005, ISBN 3928880284

== See also ==
- President Friedrich Ebert Memorial
- Friedrich Ebert Foundation

== Bibliography ==
- Shirer, William (1990). The Rise and Fall of the Third Reich. Simon & Schuster.

Military offices
New title	Supreme Commander of the Reichswehr; 1919 – 1925	Succeeded by Paul von Hindenburg
Political offices
Preceded by Max von Baden	Minister President of Prussia; 1918	Succeeded by Paul Hirsch
Preceded by Max von Baden	Head of Government of Germany; 1918 – 1919	Succeeded by Philipp Scheidemann
New title	President of Germany; 1919 – 1925	Succeeded by Paul von Hindenburg
Party political offices
Preceded by Paul Hirsch	Leader of the Social Democratic Party; 1913 – 1919; Served alongside: Hugo Haase, Philipp Scheidemann	Succeeded by Herman Müller; Otto Wels
