= Lilli Lehmann =

German operatic soprano (1848–1929)

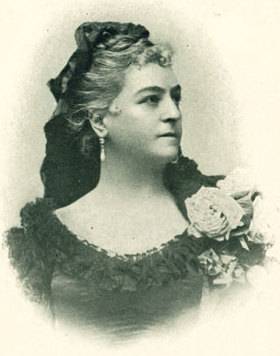
- Born: Elisabeth Maria Lehmann; 24 November 1848; Würzburg, Germany
- Died: 17 May 1929 (aged 80); Berlin, Germany
- Occupations: dramatic coloratura soprano, voice teacher
- Spouse: Paul Kalisch (m. 1888)

Signature
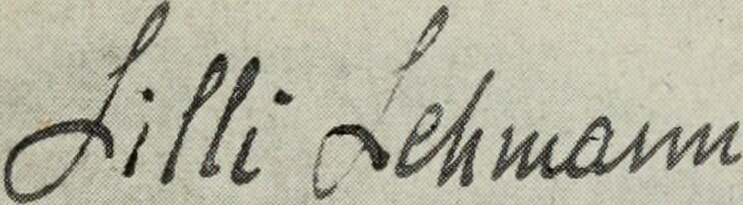

Lilli Lehmann (born Elisabeth Maria Lehmann, later Elisabeth Maria Lehmann-Kalisch; 24 November 1848 – 17 May 1929) was a German dramatic coloratura soprano who had an active performance career spanning from 1865 into the 1920s. One of the great sopranos of the late 19th and early 20th centuries, music critics hailed her as a peer to other celebrated singers of that era such as Jenny Lind and Adelina Patti. In her early career she performed lighter soprano roles from mainly the lyric coloratura soprano repertoire; and it is in this rep that she was known while a prima donna at the Berlin Hofoper from 1869 through 1885. In 1884 she made her first foray into the dramatic soprano canon at the Royal Opera House in London when she performed the part of Isolde in Richard Wagner's Tristan und Isolde. She thereafter performed roles from a wide range of fachs in the soprano literature; mastering more than 170 different opera characters during her extraordinarily long career. Unlike many singers, her voice maintained its flexibility as it grew in size allowing her to be successful in the dramatic coloratura soprano repertoire.

Lehmann was a principal soprano at the Metropolitan Opera ("Met") from 1885 until 1892 and again in 1888–1889. While her repertoire at the Met was large and varied, she was part of a group of singers that popularized Wagner's operas in America. She had earlier performed multiple roles in the first staging of Wagner's Ring Cycle at the very first Bayreuth Festival in 1876. At the Met she portrayed Brünnhilde in the first complete staging of the Ring in America in March 1889. She performed in the first American performances of several of Wagner's operas; among them Siegfried (1887), Götterdämmerung (1888), Tristan und Isolde (1886) and Tannhäuser (1889). In 1888 Lehmann married tenor Paul Kalisch who was also a singer at the Met.

Lehmann returned to the Berlin Hofoper from 1892 until 1897, and was thereafter active in opera houses internationally. She sang annually at the Salzburg Festival from 1901 to 1910 and was also artistic director of that festival for a period. She continued to perform into the 1920s as a singer of Lieder; still singing well into the last year of her life. She was also a voice teacher at the Mozarteum in Salzburg and an animal welfare advocate. She died in 1929 of heart disease at the age of 80 in Berlin.

== Early life and career from 1848 to 1869 ==
Lilli Lehmann was born in Würzburg on 24 November 1848. Her father was heldentenor Karl August Lehmann, and her mother was the soprano and harpist Maria Theresia Löw (1809–1885). Maria portrayed heroines in several operas by Louis Spohr while a leading soprano in Kassel. Her younger sister, Marie Lehmann, also went on to become an operatic soprano. Her parents separated in 1853, and she lived with her mother and siblings in Prague. There her mother gave her voice lessons and other training in music. She began studies in piano at the age of six.

Lehmann made her professional opera debut on October 20, 1865 portraying the First Boy in The Magic Flute at the Deutschen Landestheater in Prague. Soon after she took over the role of Pamina in that opera; replacing a singer who became ill during the first act at the last minute. 'In her early career she sang smaller supporting roles first and then progressed into performing lead light soprano roles. Over time she slowly developed into a dramatic soprano. Her other roles in Prague included the First Lady in The Magic Flute, the Shepherd Boy in Tannhäuser (1866), and a bridesmaid in Der Freischütz (1866) among other lesser roles.

In 1868 Lehmann became a principal soprano at the Stadttheater Danzig. Her repertoire there included Zerline in Fra Diavolo, Susanna in The Marriage of Figaro, Rosina in The Barber of Seville, Queen Marguerite de Valois in Giacomo Meyerbeer's Les Huguenots, Princess Eudoxie in La Juive, Marie in Der Waffenschmied, Marie in Zar und Zimmermann, Gilda in Rigoletto, both Donna Elvira and Zerlina in Don Giovanni, Blonde in Die Entführung aus dem Serail, and the title role in Carlo Broschi. In 1869 she joined the roster of singers at the Leipzig Opera. In Leipzig she pursued further vocal training with Heinrich Laube. Her repertoire there included The Messenger of Peace in Rienzi, Marguerite de Valois, and the title roles in La Grande-Duchesse de Gérolstein and Martha.

== Berlin Hofoper and other work in Europe from 1869 to 1885 ==
In 1869 Lehmann appeared as a guest artist for her debut at the Berlin Hofoper (BH) as Marguerite de Valois in Giacomo Meyerbeer's Les Huguenots. She became a resident prima donna at that house a year later; making her first appearance on her long-term contract on August 19, 1870 as Vielka in Meyerbeer's Ein Feldlager in Schlesien. She remained at the BH for the next fifteen years, and became so successful that she was appointed a Kammersängerin in 1876.

At the BH Lehmann starred in the world premiere of Bernhard Ludwig Hopffer's Frithjof on April 11, 1871. Other premieres she performed in at that theatre included Wilhelm Taubert's Caesario, oder Was ihr wollt (1874), Anton Rubinstein's Die Maccabäer (1875), and Johann Joseph Abert's Ekkehard (1878). Her other repertoire in Berlin included Agathe in Der Freischütz, Amazili in Jessonda, Oscar in Un ballo in maschera, Marie in La fille du régiment, Maria in Taubert's Cesario, Irma in Le maçon, the First Witch in Taubert's Macbeth, and many of the parts she had sung previously at other theaters.

In 1875 Lehmann met composer Richard Wagner at his home in Bayreuth where she performed for his excerpts from Das Rheingold. This began a long lasting friendship and artistic collaboration between the pair. Wagner also befriended Lehmann's mother and sister. Lilli sang in the first Bayreuth Festival which took place from August 13 to August 17, 1876. At this festival she performed the roles of Woglinde, Helmwige, and the Woodbird in the first complete performances of The Ring Cycle. The following year she appeared at music festival in Cologne performing Giuseppe Verdi's Requiem with the composer leading the musical forces.

Lehmann made her debut at the Royal Opera House in London as Violetta in Verdi's La traviata on June 3, 1880. She performed several more roles at that house, including the title role in Mignon (1880), Woglinde in The Ring Cycle (1882), and Isolde in Tristan und Isolde (1884). The latter role marked her first appearance as a dramatic soprano; having previously sung mainly lyric coloratura roles in Berlin. In 1882 she made her debut at the Vienna State Opera, and returned there routinely as a guest artist through 1910.

== Metropolitan Opera ==
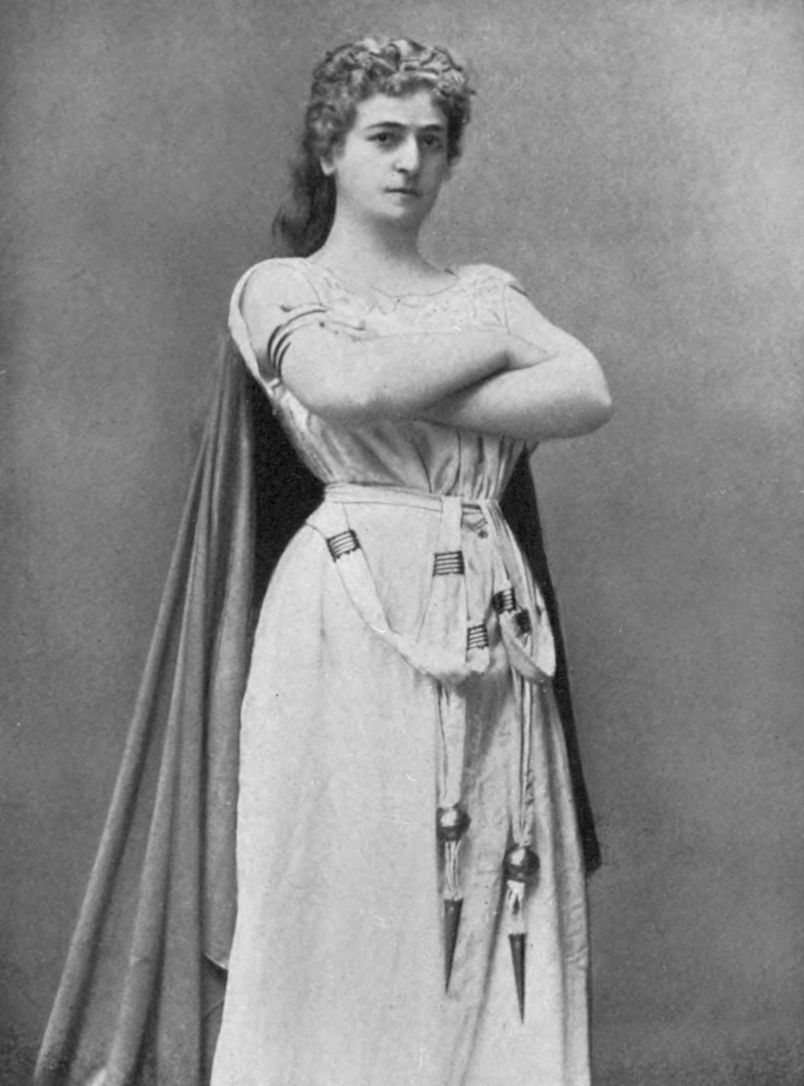
Lehmann as Wagner's Isolde

In 1885 Lehmann broke her contract with the Berlin Hofoper in order to take a position as a leading soprano with the Metropolitan Opera ("Met") in New York City. She made her debut at the Met on November 25, 1885 in title role of Georges Bizet's Carmen. Together with her Met colleagues Fischer, Alvary, Brandt, and Seidl, she helped to popularize Wagner's music in America under the leadership of Edmund C. Stanton. At the Metropolitan Opera House she performed the part of Brünnhilde in the first complete staging of The Ring Cycle in the United States in March 1889. She had earlier appeared in the first performances in America of two of the operas from that cycle: Siegfried (November 9, 1887) and Götterdämmerung (January 25, 1888). She performed in the American premieres of two more Wagner operas; portraying Isolde in Tristan und Isolde (December 1, 1886) and Venus in Tannhäuser (January 30, 1889). She also performed the part of Irene in the Met's first staging of Wagner's Rienzi (February 5, 1886).

While Lehmann excelled in Wagner roles at the Met, her repertoire in New York was vast and encompassed a wide range of parts representative of multiple fachs in the soprano literature. She performed the title role in the United States premiere of Carl Maria von Weber's Euryanthe on December 23, 1887. Other American premieres she performed in at the Met included two operas by Karl Goldmark: Die Königin von Saba (as Sulamith on December 2, 1885) and Merlin (as Viviane on January 3, 1887). She performed the part of Amelia in the Met's first staging of Un ballo in maschera in 1889, and in 1890 performed the title role in the Met's first presentation of Vincenzo Bellini's Norma.

Other roles Lehmann sang at the Met included Berthe in Le prophète, Donna Anna in Don Giovanni, Leonora in Il trovatore, Leonore in Fidelio, Marguerite in Faust, Philine in Mignon, Rachel in La Juive, Valentine in Les Huguenots, and the title role in Aida. Her last appearance at the Met before returning to Germany was as Sélika in L'Africaine on February 15, 1892. She later returned to the Met for one final season in 1898–1899 which included taking on the role of Fricka in Wagner's Das Rheingold in addition to repeating several of the parts she had sung earlier in New York. Her final performance at the Met was in a farewell gala concert on April 21, 1899.

Lehmann also performed with the Damrosch Opera Company of New York in 1897.

== Later career ==
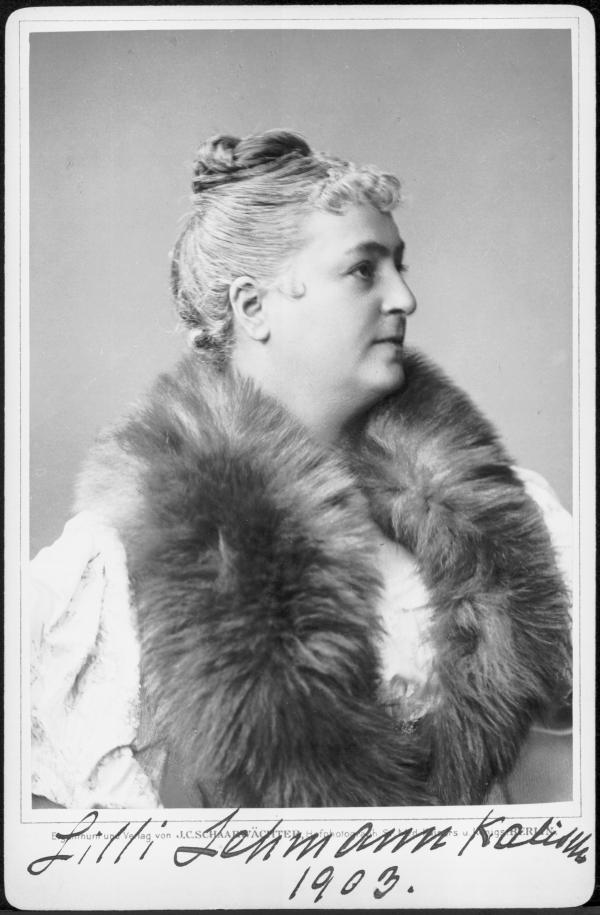
Portrait with signature, 1903

In 1892 Lehmann returned to Germany to once again perform with the Berlin Hofoper (BH). By remaining in America beyond the leave granted her by the BH, she faced a ban following her return to Germany. After the personal intervention of the Emperor, the ban was lifted.She performed in Berlin until her return to America in 1897. In 1896 she returned to the Bayreuth Festival as Brünnhilde in The Ring Cycle. In 1899 she was committed to the Royal Opera House, London, where her repertoire included the roles of Donna Anna, Isolde, Leonore, and Norma.

Lehmann gave a concert tour of the United States in 1901–1902. She was committed to the Paris Opera in 1903, and in 1909 was a prima donna at the Vienna State Opera. She performed annually at the Salzburg Festival from 1901 through 1910, and for a period was the artistic director of that festival. She was named an honorary citizen of the city of Salzburg. She returned to Paris in 1909 to perform several Mozart heroines at the Théâtre Nouveau which were conducted by Reynaldo Hahn. She also sang in operas as a guest at the Royal Swedish Opera.

Lehmann was also renowned as a Lieder singer. She continued to give recitals until her retirement from the concert stage in the 1920s.

Her mature voice of large volume gave her the reputation of being not only one of the greatest Wagnerian singers of her day, but also an ideal interpreter of Bellini's Norma and the operatic music of Mozart. She was considered unsurpassed in the roles of Brünnhilde and Isolde but also sang a wide array of other parts. Across the span of her career, she performed 170 different parts in 119 German, Italian and French operas. She was noted for her rendering of the musical score and as a tragic actress.

Lehmann was also a noted voice teacher who taught privately and on the faculty of the Mozarteum University Salzburg (MUS); notably founding the Mozarteum's International Summer Academy in 1916. The academy's curriculum concentrated on voice lessons at first but it was extended later to include a wide variety of musical instruction. Among her pupils were the famous sopranos Geraldine Farrar, Olive Fremstad, Viorica Ursuleac, Edytha Fleischer; tenors Rudolf Laubenthal, and Walter Kirchhoff; the mezzo-sopranos Lula Mysz-Gmeiner and Marion Telva; and contraltos Res Fischer and Florence Wickham. Longtime Juilliard School professor of voice Lucia Dunham, who trained many other famous singers, was also one of her pupils. In 1928 the Government of Austria bestowed upon her the title of professor on her 80th birthday in a ceremony presided over by Austria's president Michael Hainisch.

Lehmann never retired from teaching and continued to sing well up until the very end of her life. Her voice can be heard on CD reissues of the recordings which she made prior to World War I. Although past her peak as an operatic singer when she made these records, they still impress. These include recording made with Odeon Records in Berlin in 1906–1907; some of which are duets with her niece, the soprano Hedwig Helbig. In 1913 she published an autobiography, Mein Weg. In her late teaching career she compiled and edited a collection of arias and duets by Mozart which was published.

== Personal life and death ==
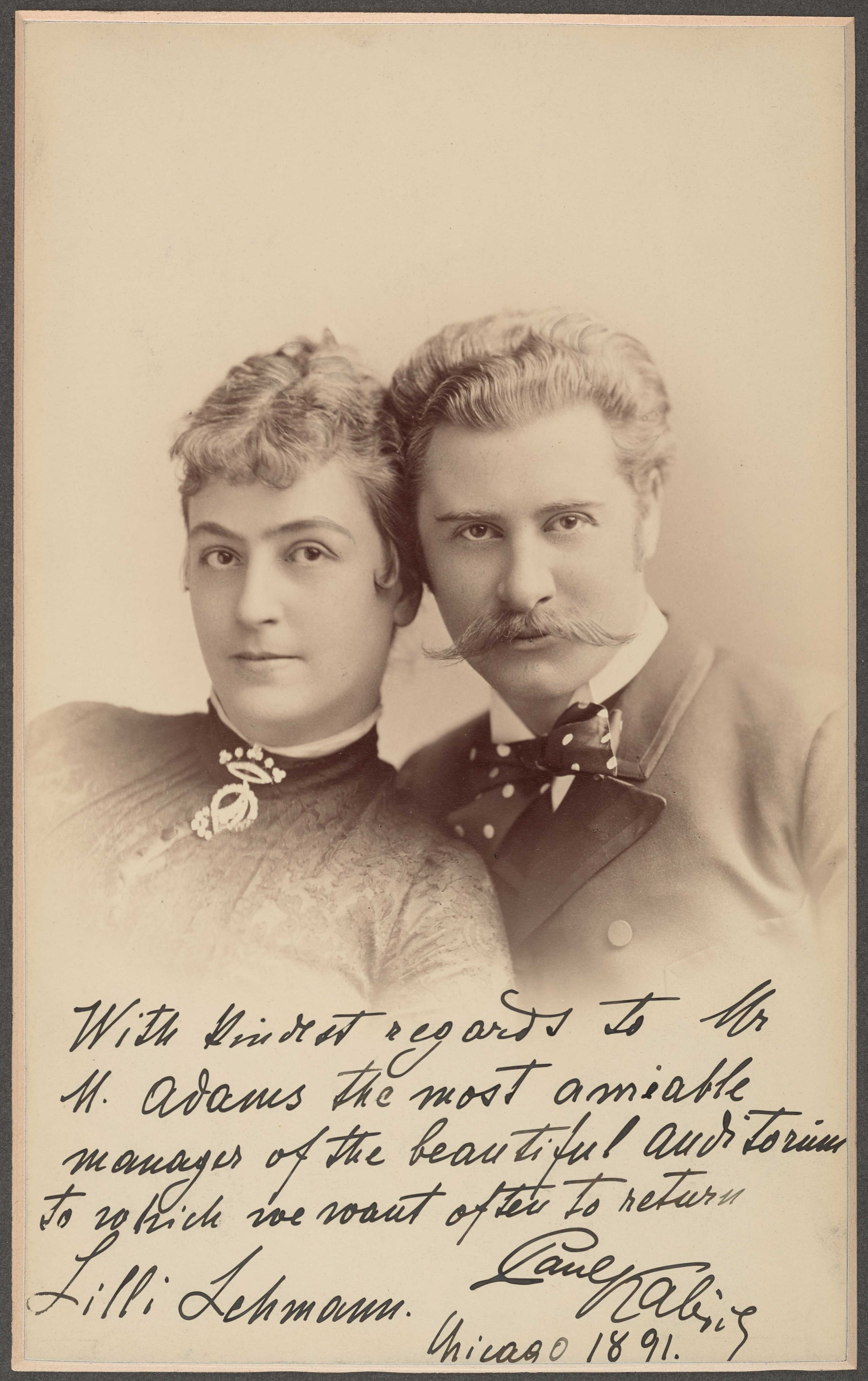
Lehmann and Paul Kalisch, c. 1891 (Newberry Library, Chicago)

Lehmann married the tenor Paul Kalisch in New York on 24 February 1888. Both singers were then under contract with the Metropolitan Opera. They were occasional stage partners at the Met with one such pairing being in Il trovatore in 1891 with Kalisch as Manrico and Lehmann as Leonora. The marriage was ultimately not successful, and while they did not divorce, they separated.

Lehmann became a vegetarian in 1896. She stated that it improved her career and health and she no longer suffered from fatigue or headaches. Her diet consisted of fruit, rice, milk, eggs, cheese, vegetables and rye bread, although she admitted she ate fish twice a year. Rupert Christiansen has described Lehmann as a "fanatic vegetarian and anti-vivisectionist, and nothing pleased her more in New York than the fact that the whipping of horses was forbidden." She also campaigned against the use of feathers from exotic birds in women's hats and costume, and after her operatic performances, she would offer her autograph to women who promised not to wear feathers in their hats.

Lehmann died of heart disease at the age of 80 on 7 May 1929 in Berlin. The Lilli Lehmann Medal is awarded by the Mozarteum in her honour.

== Publications ==
- Meine Gesangskunst. Berlin: 1902. 3rd edition, 1922.
- How to Sing. New York: Macmillan, 1902. 3rd edition, 1924, republished: Mineola, New York: Dover, 1993. (English version of Meine Gesangskunst) Translation: Richard Aldrich.
- L. Andro, Lilli Lehmann (Berlin: 1907)
- Lilli Lehmann, Mein Weg. Autobiography. (Leipzig, 1913; English translation by Alice B. Seligman, My Path Through Life, New York: 1914)
- "Mozartkurse", in: Mozarteums-Mitteilungen, vol. 1, Salzburg, 1918/19, pp. 6–9 (online)
- "Die Salzburger Don Juan-Aufführungen im Jahre 1906", in: Mozarteums-Mitteilungen, vol. 3, Salzburg, 1920/21, pp. 15–25 (online)
