= President Friedrich Ebert Memorial =

Museum in Baden-Württemberg

Coordinates: 49°24′46″N 8°42′30″E

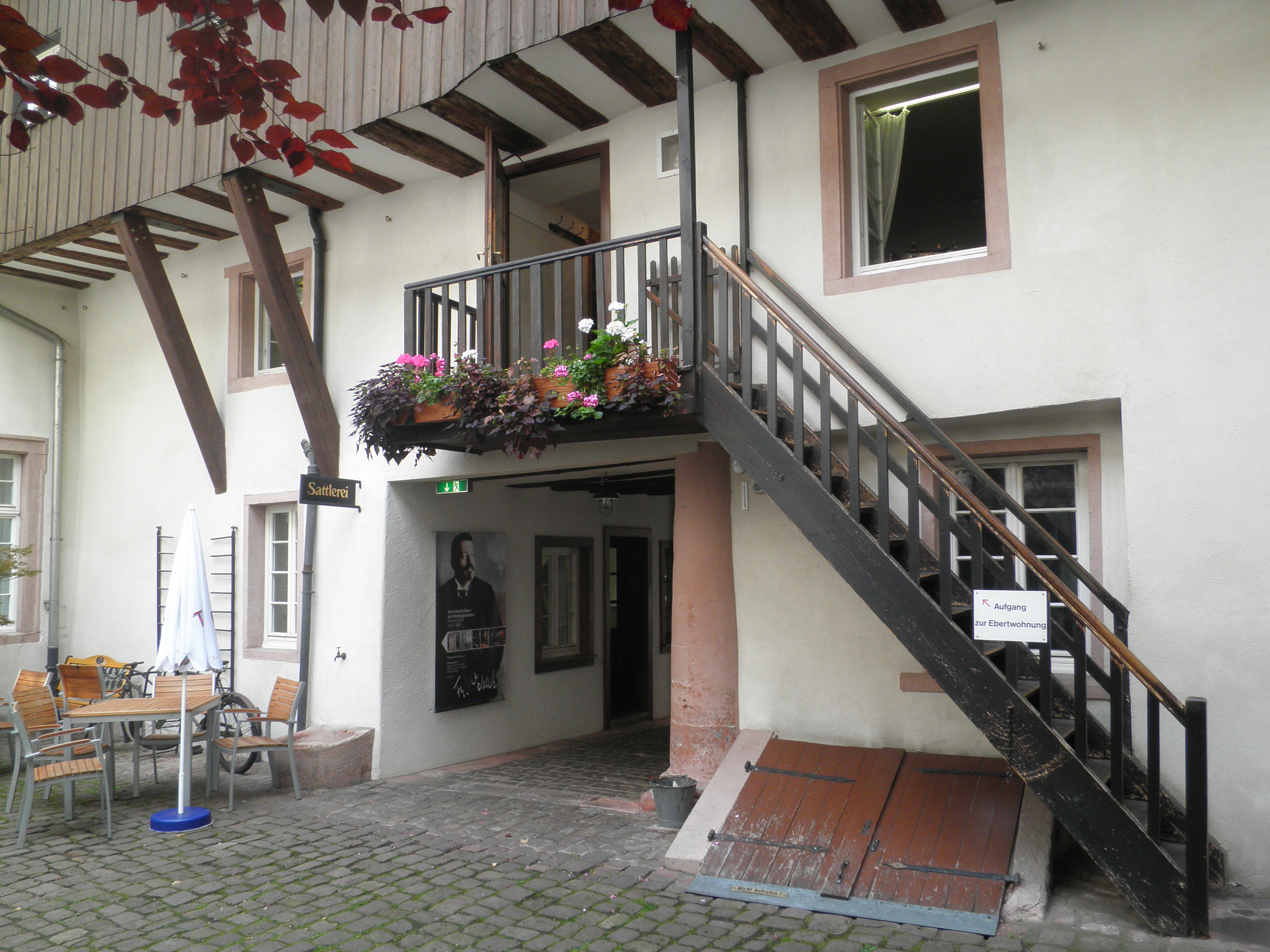
Friedrich Ebert's birthplace: The apartment above the gateway

President Friedrich Ebert Memorial, Heidelberg

The President Friedrich Ebert Foundation Memorial (Stiftung Reichspräsident-Friedrich-Ebert-Gedenkstätte) in Heidelberg is a non-partisan foundation financed by the German Federal Government. It commemorates the life and work of Friedrich Ebert, who was born in the house on 4 February 1871. From humble origins, he became a member of the Social Democratic Party of Germany and was finally elected as the first German democratic head of state in 1919. Faced with extreme internal and external pressures, he prepared the way for parliamentary democracy in Germany after the end of World War I. In these years he preserved national unity and made a vital contribution to the creation of a social and democratic republic.

== History ==
A small exhibition commemorating the life of Friedrich Ebert was first opened in his birthplace on 7 June 1962. Work on the project had started in 1960 at the instigation of Alfred Nau, an energetic member of the Friedrich Ebert Foundation. In the 1984 the city purchased some surrounding properties which made it possible to expand the exhibition space. A library and a record office, containing documents written by Ebert and some of his personal belongings, were added to the collection. In 2007, the Exhibition underwent a general refurbishment program.

== Exhibition ==
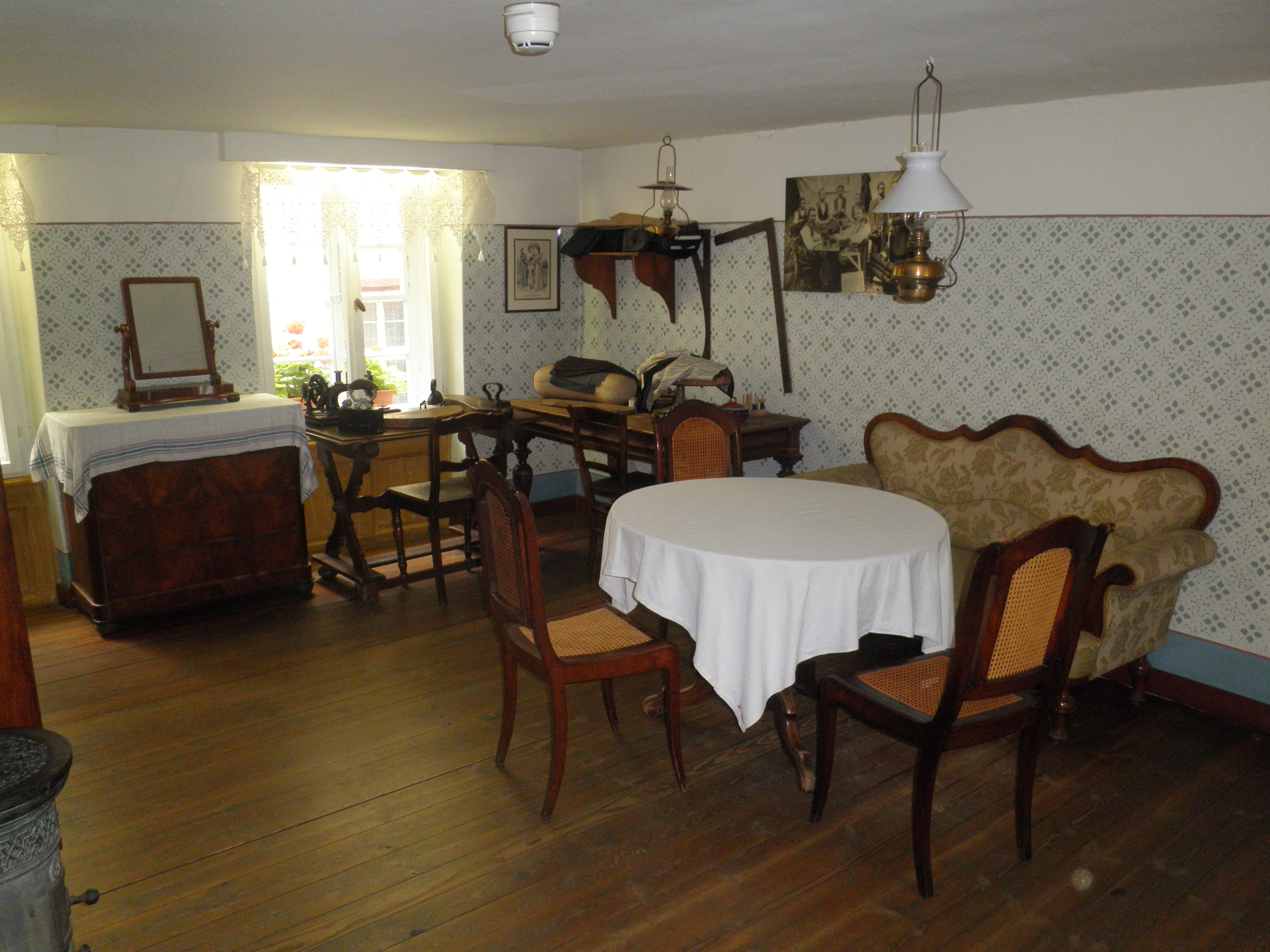
Living room of the tiny apartment

A core piece of the memorial place is the small apartment, where Friedrich Ebert was born, seventh of the nine children of a master tailor. He spent his childhood and youth with his parents and five brothers and sisters, in three rooms totalling 46 sq. m. The tiny apartment was also used by his father as workshop.

A permanent exhibition, which consists of ten rooms, follows the political stations of Ebert's life, and portrays the contemporary background to each section. On a round tour, visitors are informed of Germany's first president, and also receive insights into the history of the German labour movement and the general political history from the "Kaiserreich" up to the early years of the Weimar Republic.

In addition to the permanent displays, at regular intervals, special exhibitions are presented which are organised by the staff of the memorial place or brought in from other institutions.

There is a library, which offers more than 8,000 books, magazines and brochures, concerning the history of the labour movement in Germany and Friedrich Ebert's time in general.

Currently, the President Friedrich Ebert Memorial is visited by about 50,000 people every year.
