= Garvens =

Garvens is a surname. Notable people with the name include:

- Oskar Garvens (1874–1951), German artist
- Joseph L. Garvens (1886–1974), a member of the Wisconsin State Assembly
