= St. Lorenz (Austria) =

- Municipality
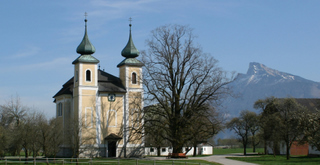

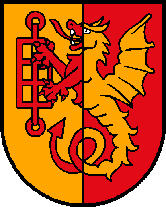
- Coat of arms

- Location within Austria
- Coordinates: 47°49′24″N 13°21′24″E
- Country: Austria
- State: Upper Austria
- District: Vöcklabruck

Government
  - Mayor: Andreas Hammerl (ÖVP)

Area
  - Total: 23.39 km^{2} (9.03 sq mi)
- Elevation: 490 m (1,610 ft)

Population (2018-01-01)
  - Total: 2,493
  - Density: 106.6/km^{2} (276.1/sq mi)
- Time zone: UTC+1 (CET)
  - Summer (DST): UTC+2 (CEST)
- Postal code: 5310
- Area code: 06232
- Vehicle registration: VB
- Website: www.stlorenz.at

St. Lorenz is a municipality in the district of Vöcklabruck in the Austrian state of Upper Austria.

== Geography ==
St. Lorenz lies in the Hausruckviertel. About 39 percent of the municipality is forest and 52 percent is farmland.
