= Oskar Garvens =

German sculptor and caricaturist

Oskar Theodor Garvens (20 November 1874 – 18 November 1951) was a German sculptor and caricaturist.

== Biography ==
Born in Hanover in 1874, and educated at the Academy of Fine Arts, Munich, Garvens was a supporter of traditional schools of art and mocked cubism in particular.

In 1911, Garvens married Margarete Unger, and they had two children, Klaus (born 1912 in Berlin) and Ursula (born 1914).

As well as publishing work in the influential arts magazine Jugend, during the 1920s Garvens became one of the leading illustrators for the satirical magazine Kladderadatsch, which identified with "militant conservatism" and was an early supporter of the Nazi Party.

Garvens sometimes signed his work with a monogram of a small letter "o" inside a larger capital "G".

He died in Berlin in 1951.

== Gallery ==
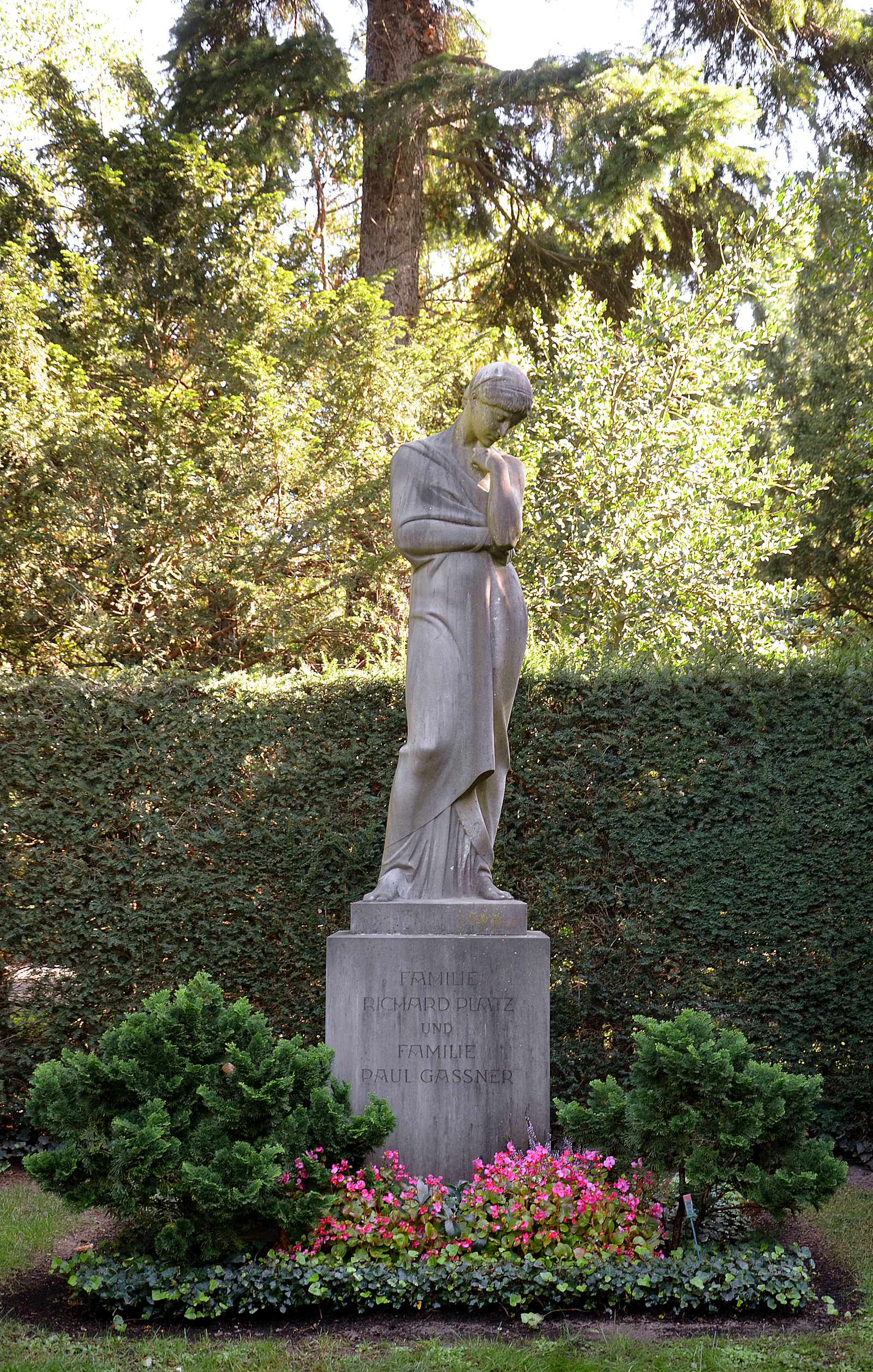
Statue in Stadtfriedhof, Hanover

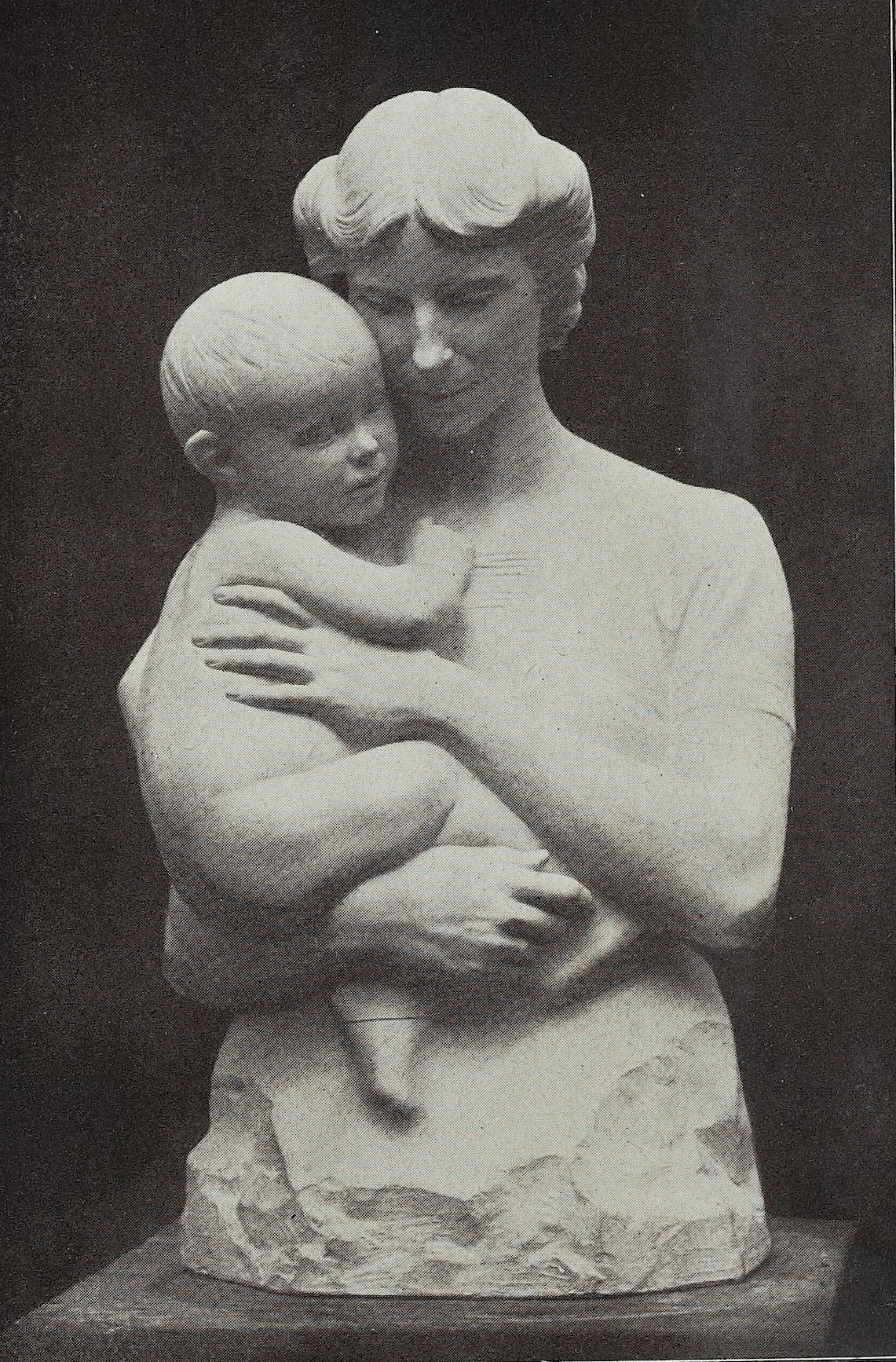
"My wife and my young son", c. 1914

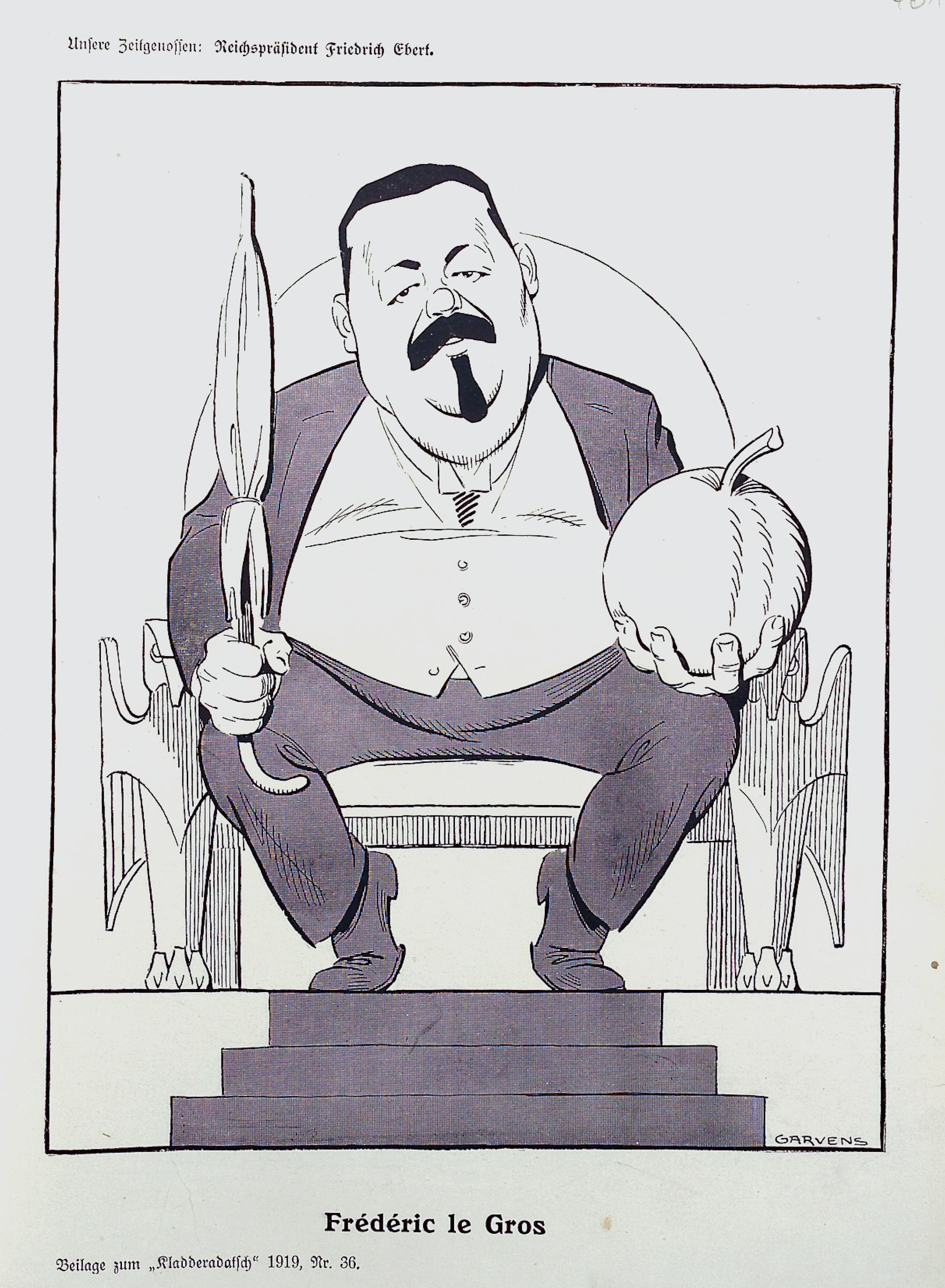
Caricature of Friedrich Ebert, 1919

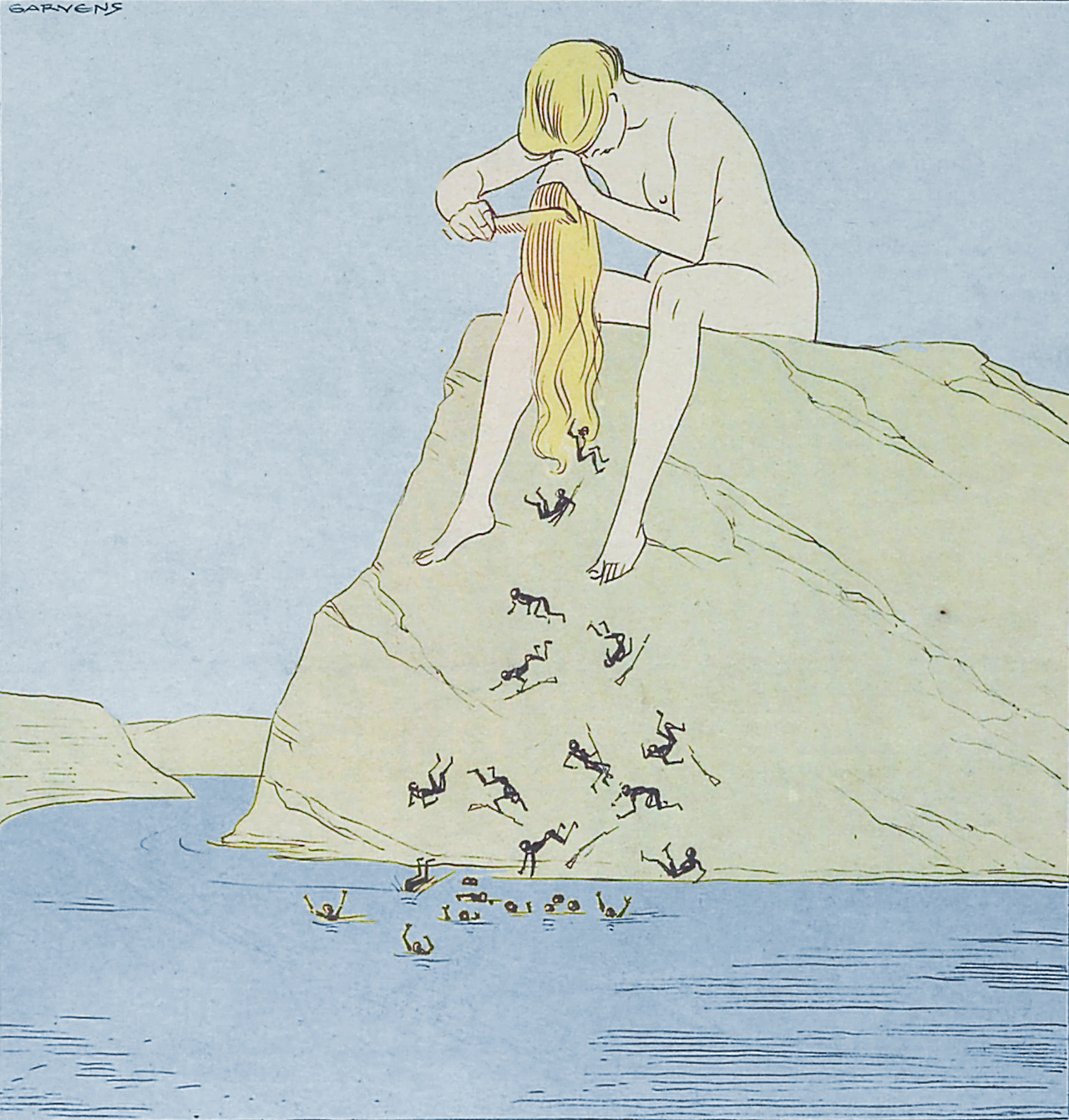
"Combing her hair", 1927

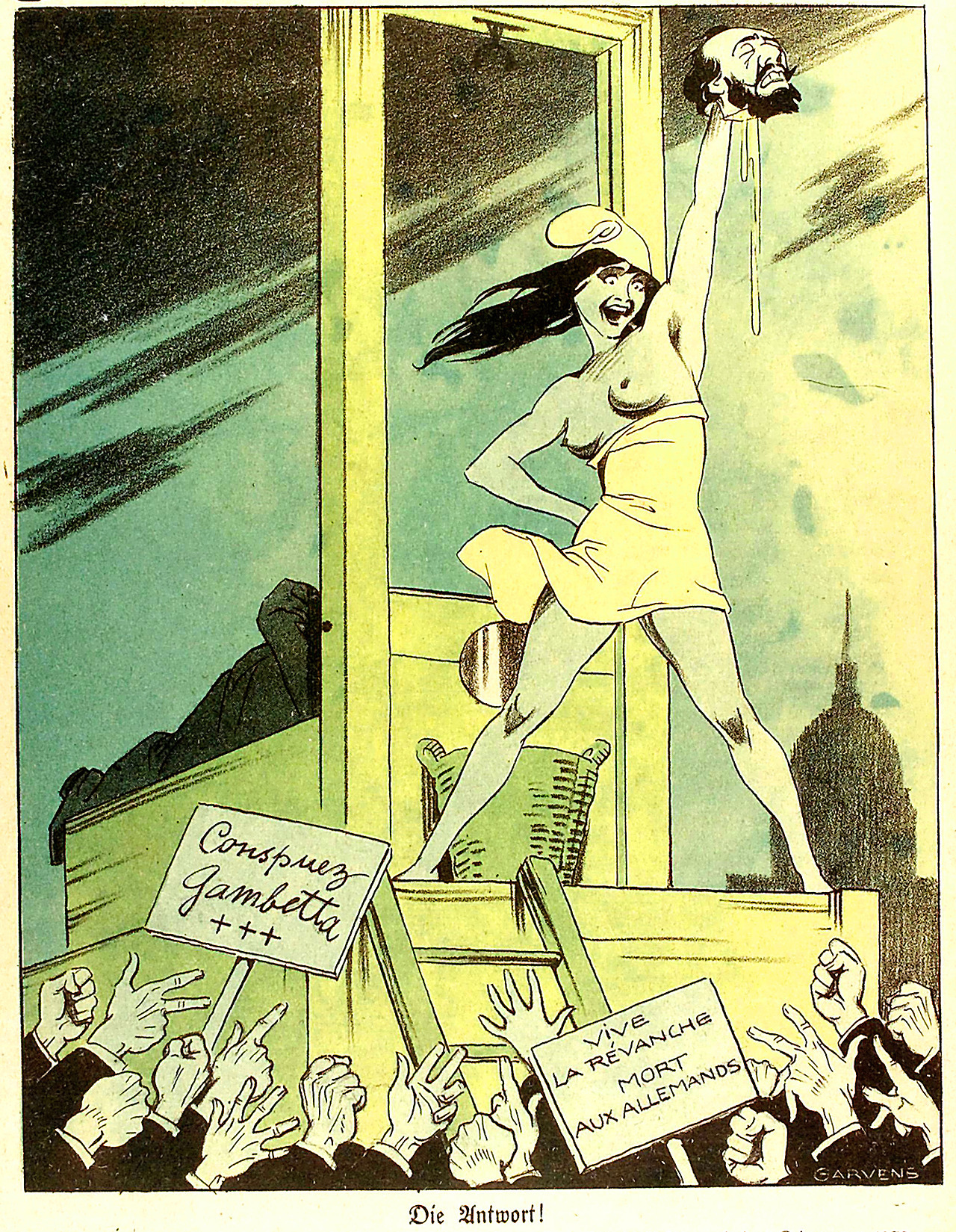
"The Answer", 1927
