= James Garven =

James R. Garven is an American finance scholar and also the Frank Shelby Groner Memorial Professor Chair of Finance at Baylor University, and also a published author of nearly 10 books, being held in 58 libraries.
