= David Kalisch =

German playwright and humorist (1820–1872)

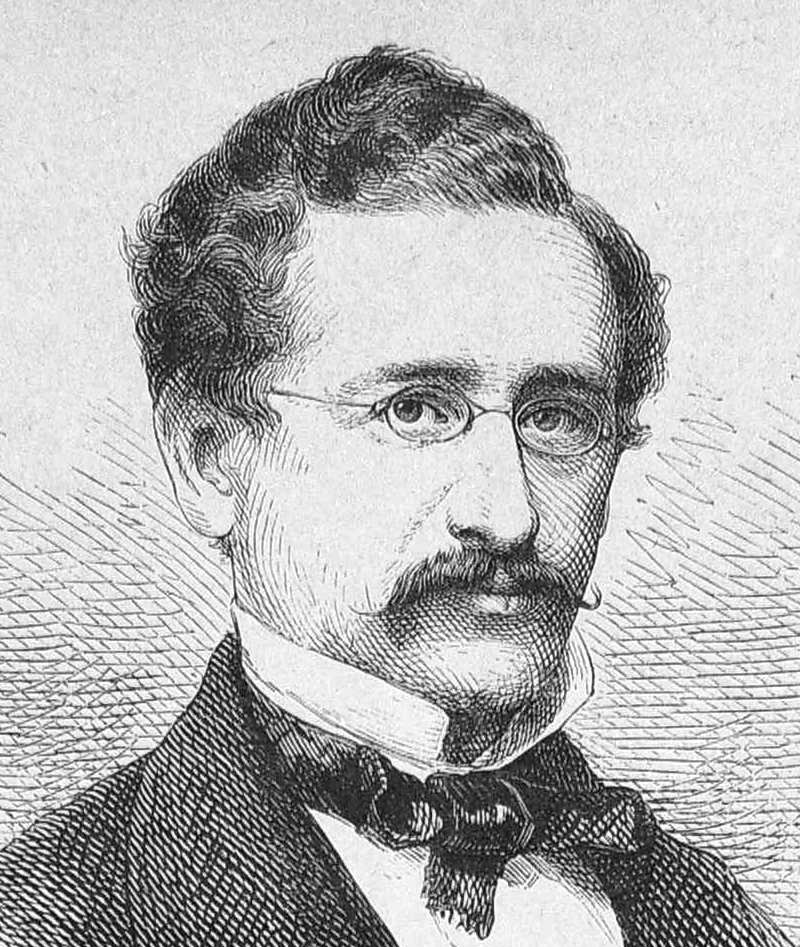
- Engraving by Adolf Neumann, published in Die Gartenlaube, 1867
- Born: 23 February 1820; Breslau, Poland
- Died: 21 August 1872 (aged 52); Berlin, Germany
- Occupations: playwright and humorist

David Kalisch (also known under the pseudonym: D. J. Schalk; 23 February 1820 – 21 August 1872) was a German-Jewish playwright and humorist.

== Early life ==
Kalisch's infancy and early childhood were spent in a home of comfort and culture. When he was only seven years old his father died, leaving the family without any means of support, and Kalisch was compelled to add to the family resources by entering the employment of a dealer in small wares, who later on entrusted him with the management of a branch establishment in Ratibor.

In 1843, Kalisch returned to Breslau, and in October 1844 went to Paris, where he gradually became on terms of intimacy with a group of poets and socialists that included Heinrich Heine, Georg Herwegh, Karl Grün, Pierre-Joseph Proudhon, Karl Marx, and Albert Wolff. He made at Leipzig his first attempts as a farce writer with his Die Proletarier and Auf der Eisenbahn.

== Early career ==
Kalisch was still bound to a mercantile career, however, as neither literature nor the stage had yet made a place for him. In 1846 he found his way to Berlin and took another position as a salesman. He found time to continue his literary efforts by writing a number of the peculiar verses which, under the name of Couplets, were first employed by him, and which he afterward utilized with great success in his stage pieces.

Kalisch also tried his hand at adaptation from the French, the little farce Ein Billet von Jenny Lind being produced at the summer theater at Schöneberg, near Berlin. The principal result of this was that it secured for him an invitation to write for the Königsstädtisches Theater, where his Herr Karoline was produced, and later (23 December 1847) his Einmal Hunderttausend Thaler, which at once achieved a veritable triumph. There followed in quick succession. Berlin bei Nacht, Junger Zunder, Alter Plunder, Aurora im Oel, Münchhausen, Peschke, Ein Gebildeter Hausknecht, Der Aktienbudiker, Berlin, Wie es Weint und Lacht, Einer von Unsere Leut, Berlin Wird Weltstadt, Die Berliner in Wien, Der Goldonkel, and Musikalische Unterhaltung.

== Success ==
Very soon he practically dominated the German farce stage of his time. At the old Wallner-Theater in Berlin and in the great comedy houses throughout Germany there were years when none but his pieces were produced, some of them having runs of hundreds of performances. Nor was it in Germany alone that his plays became famous, for by adaptation and translation they were produced throughout the world. A collection of his celebrated Couplets was produced under the title Berliner Leierkasten (3 vols., Berlin, 1857; 5th ed., 1862; new series, 1863 and 1866), while a number of his farces were issued as Berliner Volksbühne (4 vols., ib. 1864) and Lustige Werke (3 parts, ib. 1870).

== Kladderadatsch ==
In 1848, just as Kalisch was entering upon the successful phase of his dramatic career, he established the celebrated humorous sheet, Kladderadatsch (English: Chaos), the publication of which was suggested during his work on the little paper issued by and for the members of the "Rütli," a club composed of humorists. The Müller und Schulze couple, which has become proverbial among Germans throughout the world, and Karlchen Miessnick are among the best of his contributions to the Kladderadatsch.

In its early history Kalisch, as its editor, had many strange experiences. He was prosecuted; the paper was prohibited; several times he had to fly to Leipzig, Dessau, or Neustadt-Eberswalde, and yet it survived. Later he shared the editorial work with Ernest Dohm.

== Personal life ==
In 1852, Kalisch embraced Christianity in order that he might marry a woman of that faith.

== Plays and literary works ==
- Ein Billet für Jenny Lind (1847)
- Einmal hunderttausend Thaler (1847/50)
- Berliner auf Wache (1848)
- Berlin bei Nacht (1849)
- Junger Zunder - Alter Plunder (1850)
- Berliner Volksbühne (1850–52)
- Die Bummler von Berlin (1854)
- Der Aktienbudiker (1856)
- Berliner Leierkasten (1858–1866)
- Der gebildete Hausknecht (1858)
- Berlin, wie es weint und lacht (1858)
- Die Mottenburger (1867)
