= Kladderadatsch =

German satirical magazine (1848–1944)

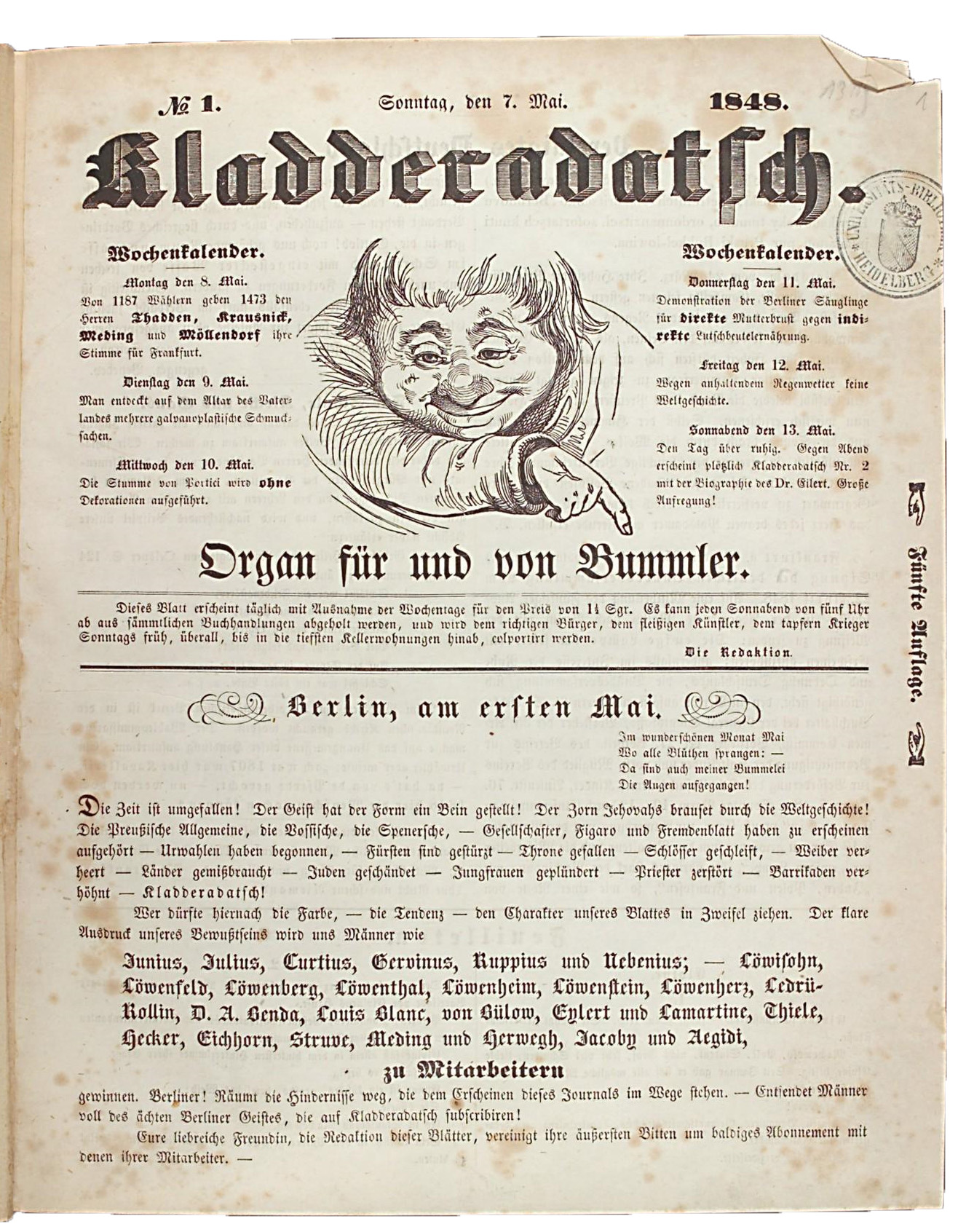
- The magazine's front cover on 9 July 1848, with the grinning boy that became its trademark
- Categories: Satire
- Frequency: Weekly
- Founder: Albert Hoffman; David Kalisch
- Founded: 1848
- First issue: 7th May 1848
- Final issue: 1944
- Country: Germany
- Based in: Berlin
- Language: German

Kladderadatsch (German pronunciation: [kladəʁaˈdat͡ʃ]; lit. 'Chaos') was a satirical German magazine first published in Berlin on 7 May 1848. It appeared weekly or as Kladderadatsch put it: "daily, except for weekdays." It was founded by Albert Hofmann and David Kalisch, the latter the son of a Jewish merchant and the author of several works of comedy. Publication ceased in 1944.

== Background ==
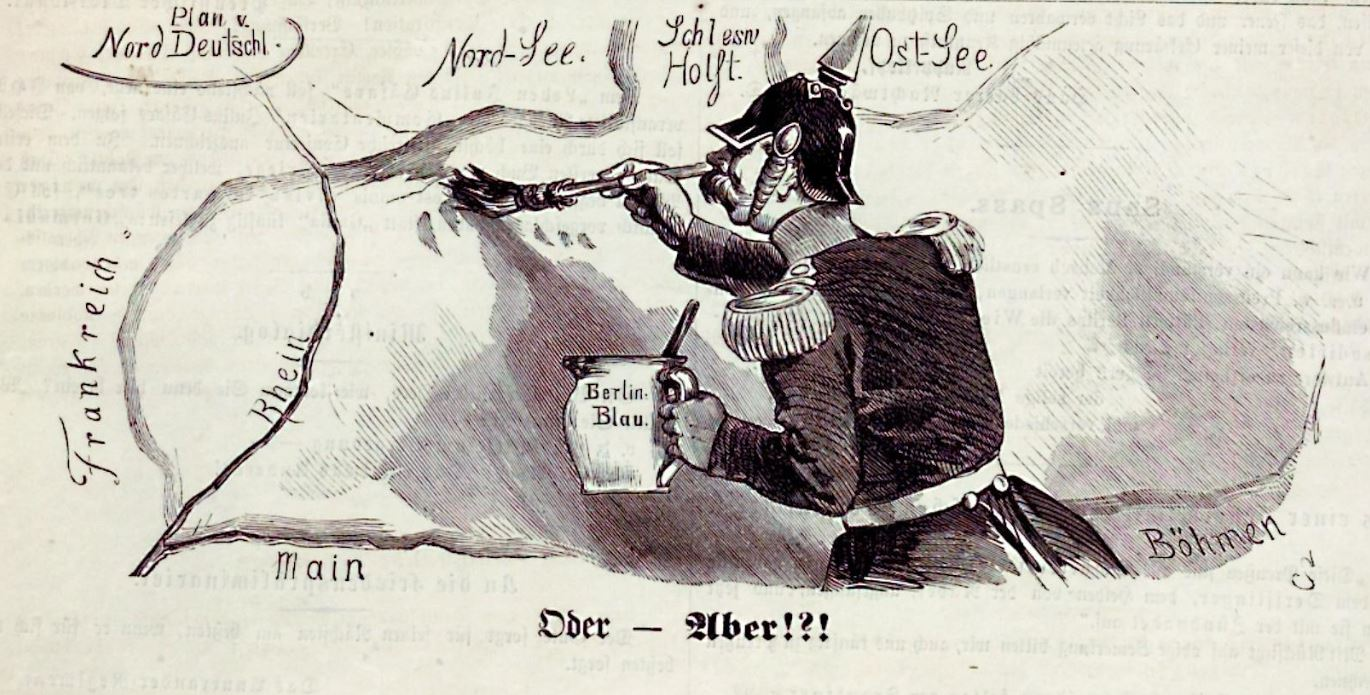
Cartoon showing a Prussian painting a map of Germany in "Berlin blue" (1866)

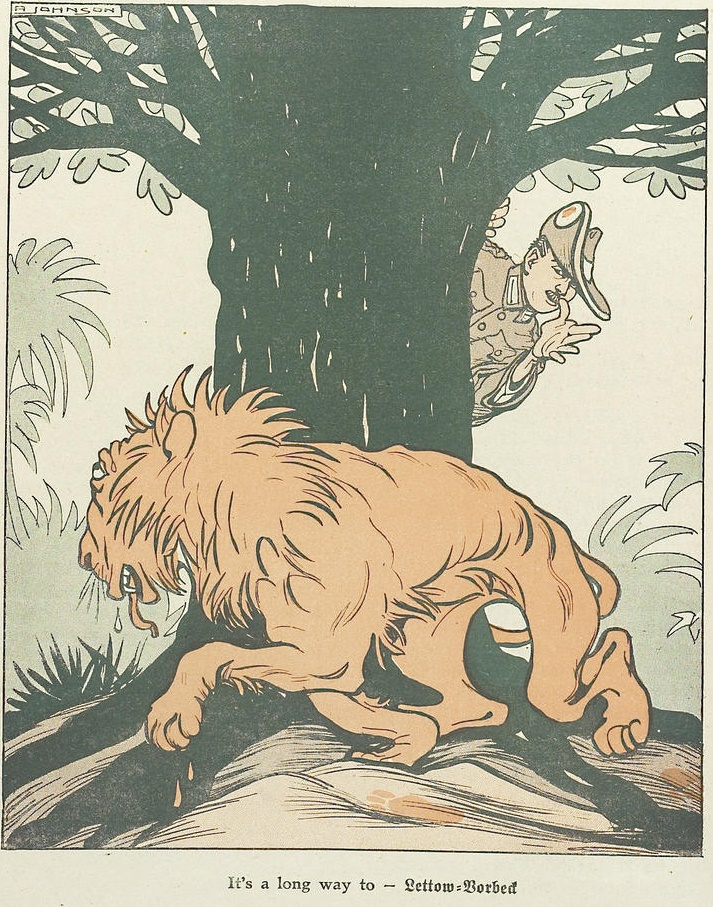
Cartoon showing Lettow-Vorbeck eluding the British lion in East Africa (1918)

The first edition, written almost entirely by Kalisch, saw 4,000 copies printed, all of which were sold within 24 hours. Two other writers, Ernst Dohm and Rudolf Löwenstein, were then employed. Wilhelm Scholz's drawings appeared in the second edition, and would do so for the next 40 years. The magazine sold 50,000 copies in 1890 and 85,000 copies in 1911.

Originally, the Kladderadatsch was a liberal magazine, but grew more conservative over the years. During the Bismarck era, the journal supported the Chancellor's policies; during the Weimar era, its stance was German-nationalist. After the 1923 takeover by the industrialist Hugo Stinnes, the magazine's contents became increasingly right-wing and showed some sympathy with Hitler and National socialism. The magazine adopted an aggressive satirical approach towards the Jews after 1933 in line with the Nazi magazine Die Brennessel.

== Contributors ==
- Gustav Brandt
- Max Friedlaender
- Oskar Garvens
- Werner Hahmann
- Rudolf Hesse
- Arthur Johnson
- Willibald Krain
- Erich Kux
- Wilhelm Polstorff
- Hans Reimann
- Carl Reinhardt
- Paul Warncke
- Fritz Wolf
- Arthur Krüger
