= Rögnvald Eriksson =

Rögnvald Eriksson or Ragnvald Eiriksson (c. 920 – 933) was, according to Egil's Saga, a son of Erik Bloodaxe. It is unclear whether Rögnvald was Erik's son by his wife Gunnhild or by another woman; the Heimskringla does not mention him among Erik's children with Gunnhild. When Egil Skallagrimsson escaped from Norway, he was pursued by Rögnvald, but killed him.
