= Hǫfuðlausn =

Hǫfuðlausn (‘head-ransom’) is the title of several Old Norse Skaldic poems:

- Hǫfuðlausn by Egill Skallagrímsson
- Hǫfuðlausn by Óttarr svarti
- Hǫfuðlausn by Þórarinn loftunga
