= Eyvind Braggart =

Eyvind Braggart is a quasi-historical figure and is a character in Egil's Saga.

Eyvind was one of Queen Gunnhild's brothers. Queen Gunnhild convinces Eyvind and his brother to attempt to kill Egil Skallagrimson but they are unsuccessful. He is known for drunkenly murdering one of Egil's men and is banished from Norway as a consequence. He is then hired by King Harald Bluetooth of Denmark to defend its coastlines. He attempts to ambush Egil Skallagrimson while raiding and pillaging with his Viking crew, but is compromised by Aki, an ally of Egil.
