= Rán =

Norse deity

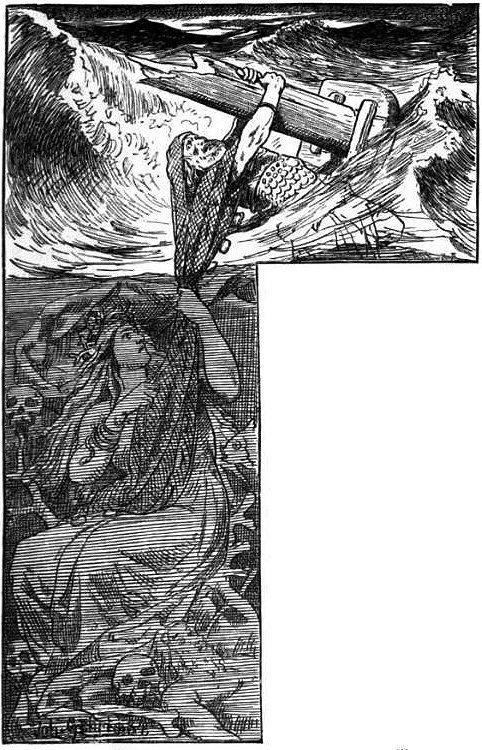
Rán uses her net to pull a seafarer into the depths. —Illustration by Johannes Gehrts in Dahn (first pub. 1880) Walhall

In Norse mythology, Rán (in Old Norse: [ˈrɒːn]) is a goddess and personification of the sea. Rán and her husband, Ægir, a jötunn and personification of the sea and together had nine daughters, goddesses and personifications of the sea waves. This goddess is frequently associated with a net, which she uses to capture sea-goers. (Note: Larrington: Rán "seeks to catch and drown men in her net".) According to the prose introduction to a poem in the Poetic Edda and in Völsunga saga, Rán once loaned her net to the god Loki.

Rán is attested in the Poetic Edda, compiled during the 13th century from earlier traditional sources; the Prose Edda, written during the 13th century by Snorri Sturluson; in both Völsunga saga and Friðþjófs saga hins frœkna; and in the poetry of skalds, such as Sonatorrek, a 10th-century poem by Icelandic skald Egill Skallagrímsson.

== Nomenclature ==
=== Etymology ===
The Old Norse common noun rán means 'plundering' or 'theft, robbery'. (Note: "ihr Name, der „Raub", rapina, bedeutet".) (Note: Faulkes (1998), p. 250 and discussion in Simek (1993), p. 260.) In turn, scholars view the theonym Rán as meaning, for example, 'theft, robbery'. On the etymology of the theonym, scholar Rudolf Simek says, "although the meaning of the name has not been fully clarified, Rán was probably understood as being 'robber' ... and has nothing to do with [Old Norse] ráða 'rule'. (Note: Grimm attempted to reconstruct an Old High German name Rahana for the goddess, from words he deemed were cognate.)

Because Rán is a personification of the sea, skalds employ her name in a variety of kennings to refer to the sea. Examples include Ránar-land ('Rán's land'), -salr ('Rán's hall'), and -vegr ('Rán's way'), and also rán-beðr ('the bed of Rán') meaning 'the bed of the sea'.

=== Aliases ===
Rán is called circumlocutorily in periphrase (kenning) as the "Gymir's völva (spae-woman)" (Note: Snorra Edda,Skaldkaparmál 25) (cf. § Figurative usage) where Gymir is another name for Ægir. (Note: Prose introduction to Lokasenna.) (Note: Snorri at Skaldkaparmál 25.)

== Mythology ==
=== Net to trap Andvari ===
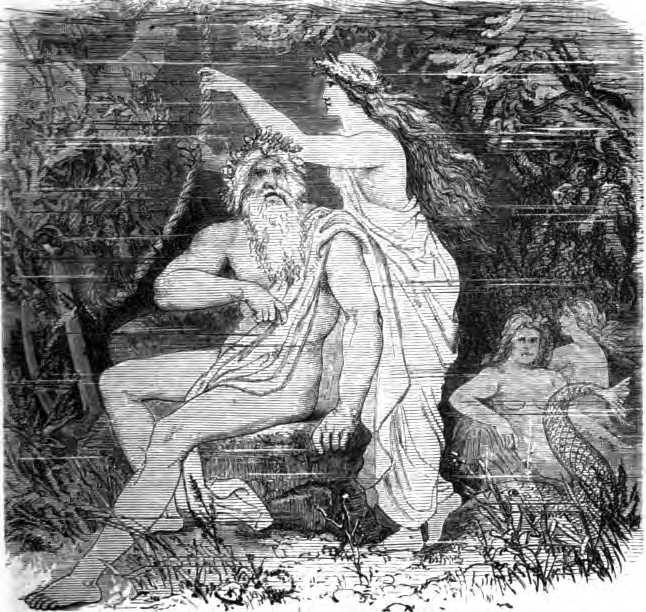
Rán pulls her net beside her husband Ægir as depicted by Friedrich Wilhelm Heine (1845–1921) after an original by Friedrich Wilhelm Engelhard (1813–1902)

Rán receives three passing mentions in the Poetic Edda; once in the prose introduction to Reginsmál as the lender of the net in the capture of Andvari, as described in the subsection below. Ran is mentioned twice elsewhere in two heroic lays, as kenning for the sea or sea-related peril or death (Cf. § Figurative usage below)

In Poetic Edda, in the prose introduction to Reginsmál, Loki visits Rán (here rendered as Ron) to borrow her net:

[Odin and Hœnir] sent Loki to get the gold; he went to Ron and got her net, and went then to Andvari's fall and cast the net in front of the pike, and the pike leaped into the net. (Note: Translator Henry Adams Bellows notes how this version of the narrative differs from how it appears in other sources, where Loki catches the pike with his own hands.)

The Völsunga saga of course also has something to say about the history of Andvari's gold and his magic ring (the Ring of the Nibelungs), thus, just as the Reginsmál's prose introduction, the saga describes how the gods "sent Loki to obtain the gold. He went to Ran and got her net".

=== Classification ===
Snorri Sturluson's Prose Edda, Nafnaþulur section of Skáldskaparmál, Rán appears in a list of goddesses (Old Norse ásynjur).

=== Ægir's banquet ===
Skáldskaparmál 33 states that the various phrases such as "fire or light or brightness of Ægir, Rán, or Ægir's daughters" (eldr eðaeða ljós birty Ægis, Ránar eða Ægis dœtra) are synonymous with "Ægir's fire" (Ægis eldr) for "gold". This comment entails the explanation for this kenning, by relating the story of Ægir's banquet when he hosted the æsir gods. The jötunn employs "glowing gold" in the center of his hall to light it "like fire" (which the narrator compares to flaming swords in Valhalla). (Note: Chapter 41 in the edition Kvilhaug quotes from.)

Swedish archaeologist Oskar Lundberg (1949) summarizes that "hall of the sea god Ægir and his wife Ran" where the drowned dead arrive, is beyond the reach of sunlight, and must illuminated with gold rather than the sun.

Snorri's narrative here also states"Þá urðu Æsir þess varir at Rán átti net Then the [Æsir] gods became aware that Rán owned a net (with which she hunted men who had drowned at sea)". It has been speculated that the original prose work Snorri excerpted must have told how the gods, irate over "Loki's flyting" (Lokasenna), resolved to "Loki's flyting" resolved to deploy Rán's magical net in order to capture Loki who fled and hid in the guise of a fish (A. G. van Hamel, 1929).

=== Friðþjófs saga ===
The mentions in the legendary saga Friðþjófs saga hins frœkna are figurative as well, but also sheds light on the beliefs of Norse seafarers.

Friðþjófr aboard ship threatened by violent storm says he faces "Rán's [dangerous] bed" ([raun]beðr Ránar), (Note: Sat ek á bólstri í Baldrshaga, kvað, hvat ek kunna, fyr konungs dóttur. Nú skal ek Ránar raunbeð troða, en annar mun Ingibjargar. Translation: On bolster I sat In Baldur's Mead erst, And all songs that I could To the king's daughter sang; Now on Ran's bed belike Must I soon be a-lying, And another shall be By Ingibiorg's side". — Translated by [Eiríkur] Magnússon and Morris (1875)) which is double entendre for both drowning, and going to bed with the goddess, (Note: raunbeðr glossed as 'bed of (hard) trials', dangerous bed, but in this instance of "raunbeðr Ránar" is an "allusion to the marriage bed" with the raun asserted to be an emendation.) which is made quite clear when he continues declaiming in verse that another man can now crawl into the bed of his surviving wife, Ingiborg.

The doomed protagonist expresses the sentiment that each man better make sure he has enough gold when they drown and "go to Rán" (at til Ránar skal fara), or as he puts it in verse, reach "Rán's hall" (Ránar salr):

Þann skal hring of höggva,
en Hálfdanar átti,
áðr oss tapi Ægir,
auðigr faðir, rauðan.
Sjá skal gull á gestum,
ef vér gistingar þurfum.
Þat dugir rausnar rekkum
í Ránar sal miðjum.

Translation:

The red ring here I hew me
Once owned of Halfdan's father,
The wealthy lord of erewhile,
Or the sea waves undo us,
So on the guests shall gold be,
If we have need of guesting;
Meet so for mighty men-folk
Amid Ran's hall to hold them"

— Translated by Eiríkur Magnússon and Morris (1875)

There is another verse like it occurring earlier in the (untranslated) shorter version of Friðþjófs saga that talks about Ran offering the brave warriors seats and benches (in her hall):

Nú hefir fjórum
of farit várum
lögr lagsmönnum,
þeim er lifa skyldu,
en Rán gætir
röskum drengjum,
siðlaus kona,
sess ok rekkju.

Translation:

Now has the sea
destroyed the lives
of our comrades,
who should have lived;
but Rán,
that ill-bred woman,
offers brave warriors
seats and benches

— Translated in H.R.E. Davidson Road to Hell (1943)

thus contributing a slight bit of additional information on the mythology.

== Figurative usage ==
In figurative speech, "to give someone to the sea-goddess is to drown them". An example of usage occurs in the Poetic Edda lay Helgakviða Hjörvarðssonar stanza 18, where the hero Atli references Rán while flyting with Hrímgerðr, a "ogress"/giantess (female jötunn).

Þú vart, hála, fyr hildings skipum
ok látt í fjarðar mynni fyrir;
ræsis rekka er þú vildir Rán gefa,
ef þér kœmið í þverst þvari.

Translation:

Ogress[=giantess], you stood before the prince's[battle-lord's] ships
and blocked (Note: látt} is 2nd pers. past of liggja "to lie", also meaning "situate" as in "lie somewhere" or lie in wait", as in Quinn's translation.) the fjord mouth;
the king's men you were going to give to Ran,
if a spear hadn't lodged in your flesh. (Note: þverst is a rare word denoting whale flesh, formerly interpreted as a preposition meaning "athwart".)

— Translated by Carolyne Larrington

One commentator infers a possible mythical element in that the accusation may reflect the hero's belief that Rán is operating in concert with the giantess.

Although "Rán's hand" (Rán or hendi (Note: G. Neckel ed. (1927) apud Finch, quoted in footnote below.)) is mentioned in the lay Helgakviða Hundingsbana I this is again just a literary personification of the perilous sea or waves. The verse describes the valkyrie Sigrún saving the ship of the hero Helgi Hundingsbane from ferocious waters. (Note: Old Norse En þeim siálfom Sigrun ofan, fólkdiǫrf, um barg ok fari þeira: snøriz ramliga Rán ór hendi giálfrdýr konungs at Gnipalundi. — Helgakviða Hjörvarðssonar, str. 30, Neckel ed. (1927) apud Finch (1962–1965) Translation: English And Sigrun above, brave in battle, protected them and their vessel; the king's sea-beasts twisted powerfully, out of Ran's hand toward Gnipalund. — Translated by Carolyne Larrington) (Note: Translation by Henry Adams Bellows (1923): "But from above did Sigrun brave Aid the men and all their faring; Mightily came from the claws of Ron The leader's sea-beast off Gnipalund" (Bellows renders Old Norse Rán as Ron throughout his translation.) But the mention of Rán is cut out by the compiler of the Völusunga saga when requoting this poem.

Snorri Sturluson's Prose Edda (Skáldskaparmál and Háttatal) contain several references to Rán. Chapter 25 of Skáldskaparmál ("How shall sea be referred to?") lists periphrases (kennings) in which poets may refer to the sea, including "husband of Ran" and "land of Ran and of Ægir's daughters", but also "father of Ægir's daughters". (Note: Anthony Faulkes renders her name Ran in his translation.) Skáldskaparmál 33 Quoted in Skáldskaparmál, the poem (entitled Ferðavísur ("Wayfaring verses") by 11th century Icelandic skald Hofgarða-Refr Gestsson contains a stanza where Rán is referred to as "spray-cold völva (spae-woman) of Gymir" (Note: Old Norse Ok sem kvað Refr: Fœrir bjǫrn, þar er bára brestr, undinna festa opt í Ægis kjǫpta *ursǫl Gymis vǫlva. — Faulkes ed., Skáldskaparmál [25] (Note: = Finnur's Danish ed. (1900),Skáldsk. 23(25), #87 = Finnur's Icelandic ed. (1907), Skáldsk. 25, #126) Translation: English And as Ref said: Gymir's spray-cold spæ-wife often brings the twisted-rope-bear [ship] into Ægir's jaws [under the waves] where the wave breaks. — Translated by Anthony Faulkes) which is just one of many sea kennings devised by skaldic poets (here a frothing or foaming sea). Snorri appends his opinion that Ægir and Hler and Gymir are all one and the same.

The subsequent stanza of the same Ferðavísur poem quoted afterwards in Skáldskaparmál uses "white Rán's mouth" as another periphrase for the sea, from which a ship makes a narrow escape. "But sea-crest-Sleipnir [ship], spray-driven, tears his breast, covered with red paint, out of white Ran's mouth [the sea's grasp]".

In the poem Sonatorrek ("Hard Loss of Sons"), Egill Skallagrímsson laments the drowning of his son Böðvar while invoking name of Rán (in stanza 7), (Note: Normalized Old Norse Mjök hefr Rán ryskt um mik; emk ofsnauðr at ástvinum. Sleit marr bönd mínnar áttar, snaran þátt af sjalfum mér. Translation: English Goddess Robbery [Ran] has shaken me hugely, I am too much deprived of loving friends; Ocean cut the bonds of my family, The strong strand of me myself — Longman's Anthology translation.) but here she is little more than an allegory for the destructive sea. He expresses his sentiment he would avenge himself against the ocean and his wife if he could, but he is powerless to do so. The subsequent stanza 8, mentions Ægis mani ("Ægir's bride/sweetheart") i.e., Rán, but again only in the sense of the sea in general. (Note: Old Norse Veiztu um ϸá sǫk sverði of rækak, var ǫlsmið[r] allra tíma; hroða vágs brœðr ef vega mættak; fœra ek andvígr Ægis mani. Translation: English You know that if I might avenge this crime with a sword, Ale-brewer[*Ægir]'s time would be over; If I could fight Wave-Pusher's[*Ægir's] brothers[*waves], I would go against them and Ægir's mistress[*Rán] too — Longman Anthology translation) (Note: Bjarni Einarsson's translation silently replaces kenning for a simpler result:"You know, /if I took revenge with the sword /for that offence, /Ægir would be dead;/if I could kill them, /I would fight Ægir and Rán")

== Scholarly reception and interpretation ==
As earlier suggested by Jacob Grimm (1854), Felix Dahn (1880) explained that Rán dwelling in water was "similar to Hel but limited to inflicting death by drowning". Rudolf Simek's dictionary (Lexikon, 1983 in German) similarly states: "... Rán is the ruler of the realm of the dead at the bottom of the sea to which people who have drowned go." Simek says that "while Ægir personifies the sea as a friendly power, Rán embodies the sinister side of the sea, at least in the eyes of the late Viking Age Icelandic seafarers". Hilda Ellis Davidson refers to three goddesses of the world of the dead, namely, Hel, Gefjon, and Rán.

== Modern iconography ==
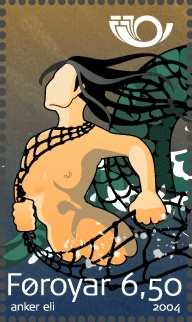
Faroese stamp of 2004 —Designed by Anker Eli Petersen

In Dahn Walhall (1880), Johannes Gehrts's illustration of Rán depicts her seated on a throne of skulls and coral, while tugging on a net ensnaring a castaway clinging to flotsam (cf. top image) The net she holds is an insignia of her power and authority, able to reach above the waves while sitting in the ocean depths.

In the Rán postage stamp for the Faroes designed by Anker Eli Petersen, the goddess is depicted erotically, practically in nude, except the net reconfigured as her garment (cf. image right). (Note: Cf. the fish-net Kraka wears when told to appear "neither naked nor clad"—Ragnars saga Loðbrókar: Margaret Schlauch tr. (1930), pp. 200–201.) (Note: The green serpent tail is not part of Rán, but that of the Midgard serpent, whose fight with Tór (Þórr) is also featured in the mini-sheet set of stamps.)

Joana Vasconcelos's Valkyrie Rán (2016) is a three dimensional installation of inflatables covered in colorful fabric, which dispenses with using the net as an associated visual element. The Portuguese artist has created a whole Valkyrie series, some reminiscent of marine organisms, including the Ran which resembles the Portuguese man o' war according to art historian Johannes von Müller.

== See also ==
- Sessrúmnir, the hall of the goddess Freyja, which may have been conceived of as a ship
