= Aki the Wealthy =

Aki was a legendary 10th-century Dane from Jutland. He played a small but important role in Egil's Saga.

While raiding with his band of vikings in Courland, Icelandic chieftain Egil Skallagrímsson and 12 of his men are captured in a clever ambush by a farmer's son and kept in a wooden stronghold overnight to be tortured and interrogated the following day. Egil frees himself and his crew and then while searching for an escape they come across a trap door to a pit from which they hear voices coming. Three Danish captives are released from the pit who happen to be Aki and his two sons. Aki informs Egil of an escape route and tells him of booty to be plundered from the farmer's land. Egil and his men help Aki and his sons escape, whereupon they return to their farms and wealth in Jutland.

The following spring Egil and his men go raiding in Denmark, around the same time that Eyvind Braggart has been banished from Norway and hired by King Harald Bluetooth to defend the shores of Denmark. Aki knew Denmark well both by land and sea. One night, Aki sends messengers to Egil to warn him that Eyvind has an ambush prepared for them on their return route. Thanks to Aki's warning, Egil and his men are able to sneak up on Eyvind's ships. Egil then gains both of Eyvind's ships as his prize.
