= Sonatorrek =

Skaldic poem in Egil's Saga

Sonatorrek ("the irreparable loss of sons") is a skaldic poem in 25 stanzas, that appears in Egil's Saga (written c.a. 1220–1240), an Icelandic saga focusing on the life of skald and viking, Egill Skallagrímsson (ca. 910–990). The work laments the death of two of the poet's sons, Gunnar, who died of a fever, and Böðvarr, who drowned during a storm. In the assessment of Margaret Clunies Ross, Sonatorrek "has probably received, from the second half of the nineteenth century onwards, the greatest literary approbation accorded to any single skaldic poem". According to the saga, after Egill placed Böðvarr in the family burial mound, he locked himself in his bed-chamber, determined to starve himself to death. Egill’s daughter, Thorgerdr, diverted him from this plan in part by convincing him to compose a memorial poem for Böðvarr, to be carved on a rune-staff.

== Manuscripts ==
The first stanza of the poem is attested in all the main medieval manuscripts of the saga (or, where these are now incomplete, in copies made when they were more complete). Only the K-manuscripts have the whole poem.

- Möðruvallabók (Reykjavík, Stofnun Árna Magnússonar, AM 132 fol)
- Die Herzog August Bibliothek in Wolfenbüttel (9. 10. Aug. 4to). This MS has a lacuna at this point, but some copies include this stanza.
- The lost manuscript known as 'K' represented by two nearly identical copies by Ketill Jörundsson, AM 453 and 462 4to.

The first half of st. 23 and the whole of st. 24 also appear in Snorra Edda. According to Bjarni Einarsson, 'the text of the poem is the result of a long series of copies and is in some instances corrupt beyond correction'.

== Form and content of the poem ==
Sonnatorrek is composed in kviðuháttr, a relatively undemanding meter which Egill also employed in his praise-poem, Arinbjarnarkviða. Kviðuháttr is a variant of the usual eddaic metre fornyrðislag, in which the odd lines have only three metrical positions instead of the usual four (i.e. they are catalectic), but the even lines function as usual. As in fornyrðislag, there is systematic alliteration but no rhyme.

Thus the first stanza, as edited and translated by Margaret Clunies Ross (with glosses on kennings and names in brackets), reads

Mjǫk erum tregt
tungu at hrœra
eðr loptvætt
ljóðpundara.
Esa nú vænt
of Viðurs þýfi
né hógdrœgt
ór hugar fylgsni.

Translation:

It is very hard for me
to move my tongue
or the air-weight
of the song-steelyard [TONGUE > SPEECH].
It is not now promising
concerning the theft of Viðurr <=Óðinn> [POETRY]
nor easily dragged
from the hiding-place of thought [BREAST].

Sonatorrek’s 25 stanzas progress through seven stages:

- st. 1-4: Egill struggles to find words to express his grief; he laments the end of his family line. The fourth stanza introduces the imagery of wood and trees representing the family that is maintained throughout the poem.
- st. 5: The poet recalls the death of his parents.
- st. 5-12: Egill relates his grief over Böðvarr’s death; using the image of the sea breaking a cruel gap in the “fence of his kinsmen” (frændgarðr). The poet would like to take vengeance on the sea-deities Ægir and Rán, but as an old man without followers he is helpless against them.
- st. 13-19: The death of Egill’s older brother, Thórólfr, is now recalled. Since Thórólfr fell, Egill has grown lonely and lacks support in combat.
- st. 20-21: The poet briefly recalls Gunnar, his first son, who died of a fever.
- st. 22-24: Egill now turns on Óðinn, with whom he had been on good terms until the god broke their friendship. Yet on reflection, the poet recognizes that Óðinn has given him two gifts in compensation for the two sons he has taken: the craft of poetry and the ability to turn deceivers into open enemies.
- st. 25: Finally, Egill reconciles himself to his loss, awaiting death with tranquility.

== Elements of pre-Christian belief ==
Sonatorrek provides an unusually personal expression of Norse paganism. The poem includes some 20 allusions to Norse gods and myths, not all of which can be understood. The poem deals with Egil's complicated relationship with Óðinn, as well as those with Rán and Ægir. The poet's personification of inevitable death as the goddess Hel waiting on a headland (st. 25) is particularly striking. It has been suggested that Egill modeled Sonatorrek and his expressions of grief on the myth of Óðinn grieving for his own dead son, Baldr.

== Sonatorrek’s status as literature ==
Sonatorrek is “generally regarded as the first purely subjective lyric in the North,” and has been called “a poem of unparalleled psychological depth, poetic self-awareness and verbal complexity.” Several commentators have compared Sonatorrek to a theme from Goethe.

== Editions and translations ==
Editions and translations include:

- Finnur Jónsson (ed.), Den norsk-islandske skjaldedigtning, 4 vols (Copenhagen: Gyldendal, 1912–15), B.i, 34ff.
- Egils saga, ed. by Bjarni Einarsson (London: Viking Society for Northern Research, 2003), pp. 147ff.
- Margaret Clunies Ross (ed.), "Egils saga Skalla-Grímssonar", in Margaret Clunies Ross, Kari Ellen Gade and Tarrin Wills (eds), Poetry in Sagas of Icelanders, Part 1, Skaldic Poetry of the Scandinavian Middle Ages, 5 (Turnhout: Brepols, 2022), pp. 152–391 (pp. 293–327).

== Scholarship on Sonatorrek ==
- Aðalsteinsson, Jón Hnefill (1999). “Religious Ideas in Sonatorrek,” Saga-Book 25:159-78.
- DeLooze, “Poet, Poem and Poetic Process in Egils saga Skalla-Grimmsonar,” 104 ANF 123-42 (1989).
- Harris, Joseph (1994). “Sacrifice and Guilt in Sonatorrek,” in Studien zum Altgermanischen. Festschrift für Heinrich Beck (Heiko Uecker, ed.). Bonn: W. de Gruyter, ISBN 3-11-012978-7, pp. 173–96.
- Harris, Joseph (2006). “The Rune-stone Ög 31 and an ‘Elegiac’ Trope in Sonatorrek,” Maal og Minne 2006, 3–14.
- Harris, Joseph (2007). “Homo Necans Borealis: Fatherhood and Sacrifice in Sonatorrek,” in Myth in Early Northwest Europe, vol. 3 (Stephen O. Glosecki, ed.). Tempe, Ariz.: ACMRS/ BREPOLS, ISBN 978-0-86698-365-5, pp. 152–73.
- Heslop, K. S. (2000). “‘Gab mir ein Gott zu sagen, was ich leide’: Sonatorrek and the Myth of Skaldic Lyric.” Old Norse Myths, Literature and Society, pp. 152-64.
- Hollander, Lee M. (1936). “The Poet Egill Skallagrimsson and His Poem, Sonatorrek,” Scandinavian Studies 14:1-12.
- Larrington, Carolyne (1992). “Egill’s Longer Poems: Arinbjarnarkviða and Sonatorrek,” in Introductory Essays on Egils saga and Njáls saga, pp. 49–63.
- North, Richard (1990). “The Pagan Inheritance of Egill’s Sonatorrek,” in Poetry in the Scandinavian Middle Ages (7th International Saga Conference)) Spoleto, Italy: Presso la sede del Centro studi, LCCN 90178700, pp. 147–67.
- Sandberg, Pete (2019). "Sonatorrek. Egill Skallagrímsson's Critique of Death," Saga-Book 43, 103-24
- Egils saga Skalla-Grímssonar, ed. by Sigurður Nordal, Íslenzk fornrit, 2 (Reykjavík: Hið íslenzka fornritafélag, 1933).
