= Gunnhild, Mother of Kings =

Queen of Norway from 931 to 933

Gunnhildr Ǫzurardóttir
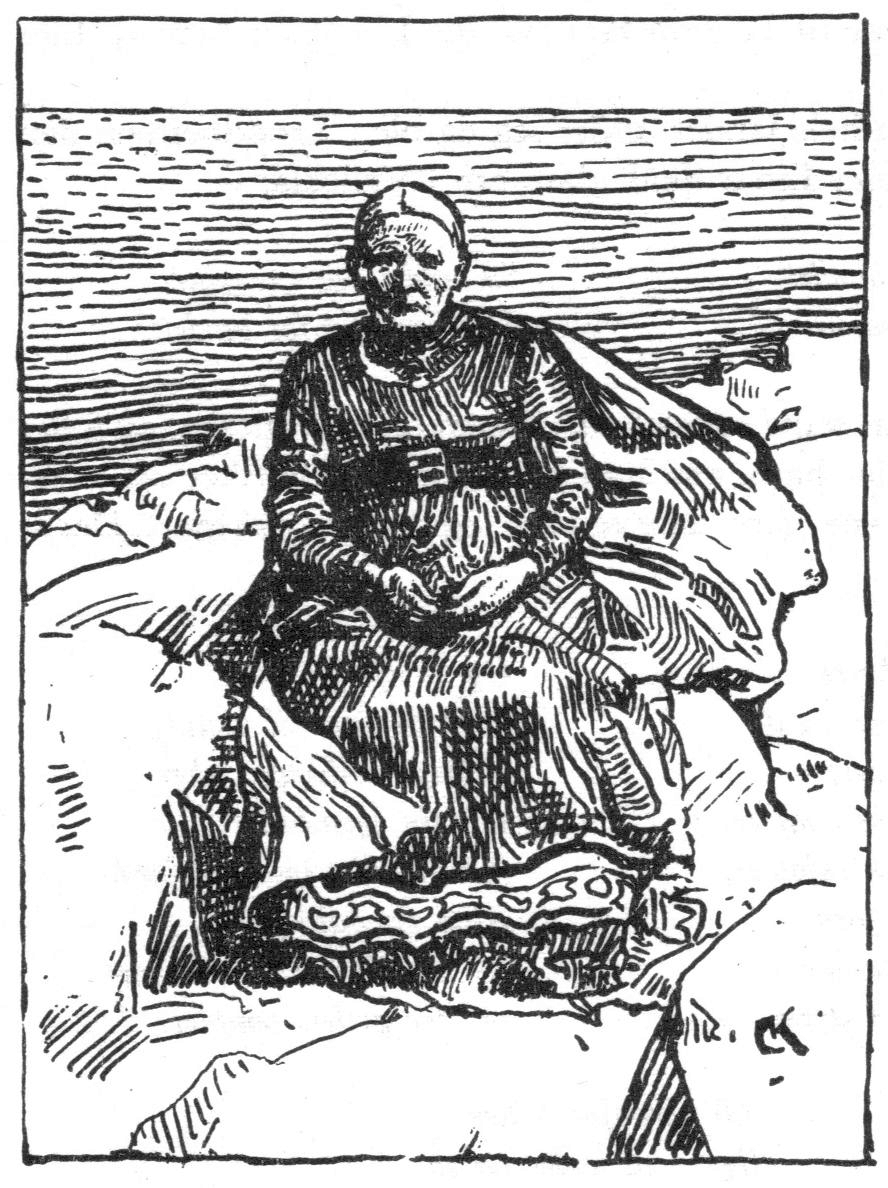

Queen consort of Norway
- Tenure: 931–933
- Born: c. 910; Hålogaland, Norway
- Died: c. 980 (Aged ~70); Orkney, Kingdom of Norway (872–1397)
- Spouse: Eric Bloodaxe
- Issue: Gamle Eiriksson; Guttorm Eirikssen; Harald II; Ragnfrød Eiriksson; Ragnhild Eriksdotter; Erling Eirikssen; Gudrød Eiriksson; Sigurd Sleva; Rögnvald Eriksson (?)
- Father: Ozur Toti

Gunnhildr konungamóðir (mother of kings) or Gunnhildr Ǫzurardóttir, whose name is often Anglicised as Gunnhild (c. 910 – c. 980), is a quasi-historical figure who appears in the Icelandic Sagas, according to which she was the wife of Eirik Bloodaxe (King of Norway 930–934, King of Orkney c. 937–954, and King of Jórvík 948–49 and 952–954). She appears prominently in sagas such as Fagrskinna, Egils saga, Njáls saga, Heimskringla, and Óláfs saga Tryggvasonar en mesta.

The sagas relate that Gunnhild lived during a time of great change and upheaval in Norway. Her father-in-law Harald Fairhair had recently united much of Norway under his rule. Shortly after his death, Gunnhild and her husband Eirik Bloodaxe were overthrown and exiled. She spent much of the rest of her life in exile in Orkney, Jorvik and Denmark. A number of her many children with Eirik became co-rulers of Norway in the late tenth century.

== Historicity ==
Many of the details of her life are disputed, including her parentage. Although she is treated in the sagas as a historical person, even her historicity is a matter of some debate. What details of her life are known come largely from Norwegian and Icelandic sources.

In the sagas, Gunnhild is most often depicted in a negative light, and depicted as a figure known for her "power and cruelty, admired for her beauty and generosity, and feared for her magic, cunning, sexual insatiability, and her goading", according to Jenny Jochens.

== Origins ==
The parentage and geographical origin of Gunnhildr konungamóðir are debated. Most medieval sources that comment on the question state that she came from Hálogaland, northern Norway. Heimskringla, Fagrskinna, Ágrip af Nóregskonungasögum, Ólafs saga Odds, Egils saga Skalla-Grímssonar and Njáls saga all identify her father as Qssur (or Qzurr), a hersir from Halogaland known by the bynames tóti and láfskeggr. Six accounts state her North-Norwegian origin explicitly; (Note: For example, Heimskringla: Harald Fairhair's Saga § 34... [rest of note]) fourteen others mention her without commenting on it. Historia Norwegiæ, a Latin text from the second half of the twelfth century, is the only medieval source to make her a daughter of Gormr inn gamli, king of Denmark, and Thyra.

Before the nineteenth century, historians such as Gerhard Schøning, Tormod Torfæus and Niels Matthias Petersen followed the saga tradition and placed Gunnhildr in Hálogaland. The Danish hypothesis emerged only after Peter Andreas Munch discovered and edited Historia Norwegiæ in 1850. Sigurður Nordal and Halvdan Koht gave it its fullest argumentation, resting on the text's antiquity, the kinship they inferred from the name Gormr among Gunnhildr's sons, and the purported political value of a Norwegian–Danish marriage. Later exponents have, in the main, deferred to the Historia on the same grounds.

The probative value of this Norwegian synoptic has been predicated upon the perceived anteriority of the original, conventionally dated to the second half of the twelfth century, though estimates range from the 1140s to the early thirteenth century. However, with the composition of Ólafs saga Odds now generally placed c. 1170–90, Historia Norwegiæ can no longer be assumed to precede it: the two are roughly contemporary — the saga perhaps earlier — to which may be added the anteriority of Ólafs saga's extant copies, dating to c. 1250–1300 against the fourteenth- and fifteenth-century manuscripts that preserve the Historia. To this may be added that the evidentiary weight carried by Norwegian and Icelandic records is also a consequence of her conspicuous absence from the Danish corpus. Gesta Danorum and its summary Compendium Saxonis mention Gunnhildr only in passing, and the Chronicle of Leire, the Lund and Ryd annals, and the early twelfth-century Chronicle of Roskilde do not mention her at all.

The proposition that she was a Danish princess has been difficult to reconcile with the dearth of attestation to her in the Danish sources. The incongruity is the more striking given her later significance as the wife of a king, the mother of several, and a dominant force among them. It has been proposed that memory of her eventually faded in her native Denmark, though this has been criticised as an ad hoc explanation and one that has never been adequately developed.

Turning to the onomastic evidence invoked in support of a Danish origin, the argument rests on the name Gormr, borne by a son of Gunnhildr in Historia Norwegiae and Ágrip, which was taken by Sigurður Nordal and Halvdan Koht as evidence of descent from his Danish namesake, with Guthormr and Guðrøðr treated as variants of the same name. The inference has been questioned on two grounds: the names in question rank among the commonest in Old Norse literature and cannot bear the evidentiary weight placed on them, and the argument assumes that names followed biological lines more rigidly than the sagas warrant, since sons might be named for foster-fathers, maternal kinsmen or patrons rather than ancestors. Perabo concludes that the naming evidence is too uncertain, and the names too common, to support the Danish case.

The political objection to a Hálogaland origin — that a king of Norway would not marry his heir to a woman from so remote a district — has been questioned on the ground that Hálogaland was neither remote nor poor. The region was the seat of families whose standing was established well before the Viking Age, and whose integration into the Norwegian kingdom ran through the jarls of Hlaðir, themselves based there for much of the period. Excavation at Borg in Lofoten has revealed a chieftain's hall of a scale and finish comparable to any in southern Scandinavia, a find that has been taken to show that the northern elite was in no way behind its southern counterparts in material culture.

The sorcery for which Gunnhildr is notorious across the corpus fits the same setting. The most repeated trope about her is that she was a skilled sorceress, a trope most readily identified with northern Norway in the sagas that mention her. Whether her acumen for magic is accurately recounted, or an inference the saga authors made because of her background, boils down to the same thing with respect to where she grew up. The sagas variously record her fosterage in the entourage of the Sami notable Mǫttul, instruction from two sorcerers in Finnmǫrk, among other details. The Sami people, who mostly lived (as they do now) in the far North, were identified with witchcraft throughout medieval and early modern literature, not only in Norse texts but in Latin and English accounts as well: Bartholomew Anglicus describes Sami weather magic in detail, and Ranulf Higden notes it more briefly. Norwegian law codes of the twelfth and thirteenth centuries forbade consultation of Sami practitioners for divination, which suggests the practice was widespread enough to warrant legislation. Norse and Sami communities "north of Dovre" lived in close proximity and were in close contact — trading, taxing, fishing alongside one another — and in some contact zones buried their dead in the same ground, as the grave at Loppa in Finnmǫrk illustrates.

Recent work has accordingly reaffirmed that Gunnhildr was most likely Norwegian, with Titlestad defending Hálogaland as her birthplace and Perabo attributing the Danish hypothesis in part to Norwegian nation-building and to anti-Danish sentiments in Norway and Iceland during the High Middle Ages and later when Koht popularised the hypothesis.

== Marriage with Eric ==
=== Eric's kinslaying and exile ===
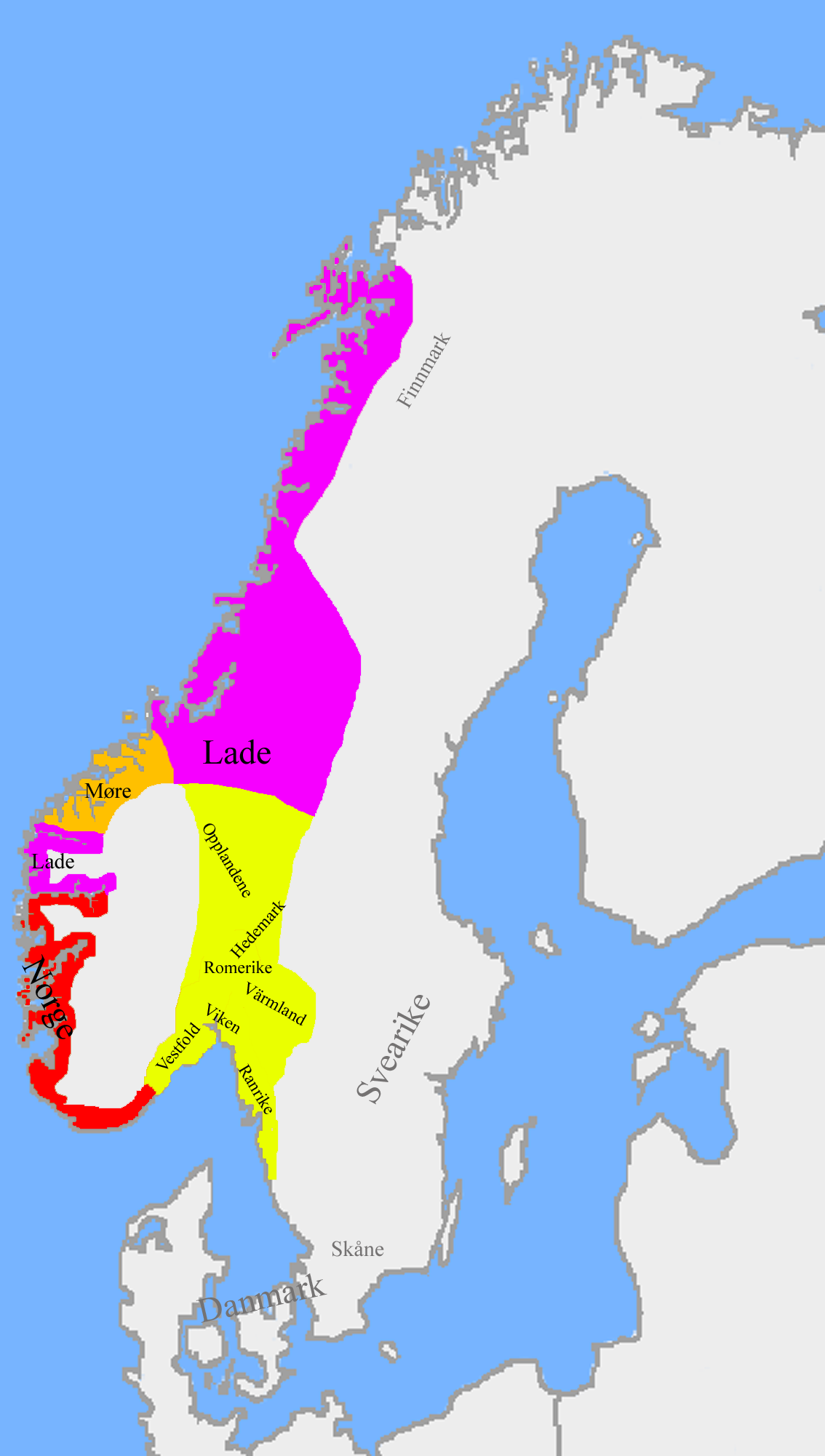
Harald I's division of Norway c. 930 CE. Red - the domain of the High King of Norway. Yellow areas are petty kingdoms assigned to Harald's kinsmen. Purple - the domain of the jarls of Hlaðir. Orange - the domain of the jarls of Møre.

Gunnhild and Eric are said to have had the following children: Gamle, the oldest; then Guthorm, Harald, Ragnfrod, Ragnhild, Erling, Gudrod, and Sigurd Sleva. Egil's Saga mentions a son named Rögnvald, but it is not known whether he can be identified with one of those mentioned in Heimskringla, or even whether he was Gunnhild's son or Eric's by another woman.

Gunnhild was widely reputed to have or otherwise employ magical powers. Prior to the death of Harald Fairhair, Erik's popular half-brother Halfdan Haraldsson the Black died mysteriously, and Gunnhild was suspected of having "bribed a witch to give him a death-drink." Shortly thereafter, Harald died and Eric consolidated his power over the whole country. He began to quarrel with his other brothers, egged on by Gunnhild, and had four of them killed, beginning with Bjørn Farmann and later Olaf and Sigrød in battle at Tønsberg. As a result of Eric's tyrannical rule, he was expelled from Norway when the nobles of the country declared for his half-brother, Haakon the Good.

=== Orkney and Jorvik ===
According to the Icelandic sagas, Eric set sail with his family and his retainers to Orkney, where they settled for a number of years. During that time Eric was acknowledged as "King of Orkney" by its de facto rulers, the jarls Arnkel and Erlend Turf-Einarsson. Gunnhild went with Eric to Jorvik when, at the invitation of Bishop Wulfstan, the erstwhile Norwegian king settled as client king over northern England. At Jorvik, both Eric and Gunnhild may have been baptized.

Following Eric's loss of Jorvik and subsequent death at the Battle of Stainmore (954), the survivors of the battle brought word of the defeat to Gunnhild and her sons in Northumberland. Taking with them all that they could, they set sail for Orkney, where they exacted tribute from the new jarl, Thorfinn Skullsplitter.

Ultimately, however, Gunnhild decided to move on; marrying her daughter Ragnhild to Jarl Thorfinn's son Arnfinn, she took her other children and set sail for Denmark.

Some modern historians call into question the identification of the Eric who ruled over Jorvik with Eric Bloodaxe. None of the English sources for Eric's reign in Northumbria identify him as Norwegian or as the son of Harald Fairhair. A thirteenth-century letter from Edward I to Pope Boniface VIII identifies Eric as Scottish in origin. Lappenberg, Plummer and Todd, writing in the late nineteenth century, identified Eric as a son of Harald Bluetooth, a claim Downham discounts as untenable. Downham, however, regards Eric the king of Jorvik as a distinct individual from Eric Bloodaxe, and thus views Gunnhild's sojourn in Orkney and Jorvik as the construct of later saga-writers who conflated different characters between the eleventh and thirteenth centuries.

=== Conflict with Egill Skallagrímsson ===
Gunnhild was the nemesis of Egill Skallagrímsson, and his saga and poetry present her in a particularly negative light. Egil was introduced to Erik by his older brother Thorolf, who was a friend of the prince, and the brothers were originally on good terms with Eric and Gunnhild. However, during a sojourn in Norway around 930, Egil got into an inheritance dispute with certain members of Eric's court, during which he killed Bárðr of Atley, one of the king's retainers.

Gunnhild ordered her two brothers to kill Egil and Thorolf. Egil killed the pair when they confronted him, greatly increasing the Queen's thirst for revenge.

Eric then declared Egil an outlaw in Norway. Berg-Önundr gathered a company of men to capture Egil, but was killed in his attempt to do so. During his escape from Norway, Egil killed Rögnvald Eriksson, Erik's son. He then cursed Eric and Gunnhild by setting a horse's head on a pole in a shamanic ritual (the pillar was a níðstöng or "níð-pole"; níð translates, roughly, to 'scorn' or 'curse'.) and saying:

"Here I set up a níð-pole, and declare this níð against King Erik and Queen Gunnhildr", — he turned the horse-head to face the mainland — "I declare this níð at the land-spirits there, and the land itself, so that all will fare astray, not to hold nor find their places, not until they wreak King Eric and Gunnhild from the land." He set up the pole of níð in the cliff-face and left it standing; he faced the horse's eyes on the land, and he rist runes upon the pole, and said all the formal words of the curse.

The last encounter between Egil and Gunnhild occurred around 948 in Jorvik. Egil was shipwrecked on a nearby shore and came before Eric, who sentenced him to death. But Egil composed a drápa called "Höfuðlausn" in Eric's praise over a single night. When he recited it in the morning, Eric gave him his freedom and forgave the killing of Rögnvald, against Gunnhild's wishes.

== Life after Eric ==
=== In Denmark ===
After the death of her husband, Gunnhild took refuge with her sons at the court of Harald Bluetooth at Roskilde. Tradition ascribes to Gunnhild the commissioning of the skaldic poem Eiríksmál in honor of her fallen husband.

In Denmark, Gunnhild's son Harald was fostered by the king himself, and her other sons were given properties and titles. As King Harald was involved in a war against Haakon's Norway, he may have sought to use Gunnhild's sons as his proxies against the Norwegian king. One of her sons, Gamle, died fighting King Haakon around 960.

=== Return to Norway ===
Gunnhild returned to Norway in triumph when her remaining sons killed King Haakon at the Battle of Fitjar in 961. The battle was a victory for Haakon's forces but his death left a power vacuum which Gunnhild's son Harald, with Danish aid, was able to exploit. With her sons now ensconced as the lords of Norway, Gunnhild was from this time known as konungamóðir, or "Mother of Kings."

During the reign of Harald Greyhide, Gunnhild dominated the court; according to Heimskringla she "mixed herself much in the affairs of the country." Gunnhild's sons killed or deposed many of the jarls and petty kings that had hitherto ruled the Norwegian provinces, seizing their lands. Famine, possibly caused or exacerbated by these campaigns, plagued the reign of Harald.

Among the kings slain (around 963) was Tryggve Olafsson whose widow Astrid Eriksdotter fled with her son Olaf Tryggvason to Sweden and then set out for the eastern Baltic. According to Heimskringla Astrid's flight and its disastrous consequences were in response to Gunnhild having sent soldiers to kidnap or kill her infant son.

Gunnhild was the patron and lover of Hrut Herjolfsson (or Hrútur Herjólfsson), an Icelandic chieftain who visited Norway during the reign of Gunnhild's son Harald. This dalliance was all the more scandalous given the difference in their ages; the fact that Gunnhild was a generation older than Hrut was considered noteworthy. Gunnhild engaged in public displays of affection with Hrut that were normally reserved for married couples, such as putting her arms around his neck in an embrace. Moreover, Gunnhild had Hrut sleep with her alone in "the upper chamber." Laxdaela Saga in particular describes the extent to which she became enamored of Hrut:

Gunnhild, the Queen, loved him so much that she held there was not his equal within the guard, either in talking or in anything else. Even when men were compared, and noblemen therein were pointed to, all men easily saw that Gunnhild thought that at the bottom there must be sheer thoughtlessness, or else envy, if any man was said to be Hrut's equal.

She helped Hrut take possession of an inheritance by arranging the death of a man named Soti at the hands of her servant, Augmund and her son Gudrod. When Hrut returned home, Gunnhild gave him many presents, but she cursed Hrut with priapism to ruin his marriage to Unn, daughter of Mord Fiddle; the two ultimately divorced.

Gunnhild also showed great favor to Olaf the Peacock, Hrut's nephew, who visited the Norwegian court after Hrut's return to Norway. She advised him on the best places and items to trade and even sponsored his trade expeditions.

=== Exile and death ===
Haakon Sigurdsson, jarl of Hlaðir, arranged the death of Harald Greyhide around 971 with the connivance of Harald Bluetooth, who had invited his foster-son to Denmark to be invested with new Danish fiefs. Civil war broke out between Jarl Haakon and the surviving sons of Erik and Gunnhild, but Haakon proved victorious and Gunnhild had to flee Norway once again, with her remaining sons Gudrod and Ragnfred. They went to Orkney, again imposing themselves as overlords over Jarl Thorfinn. However, it appears that Gunnhild was less interested in ruling the country than in having a place to live quietly, and her sons used the islands as a base for abortive raids on Haakon's interests; the government of Orkney was therefore firmly in the hands of Thorfinn.

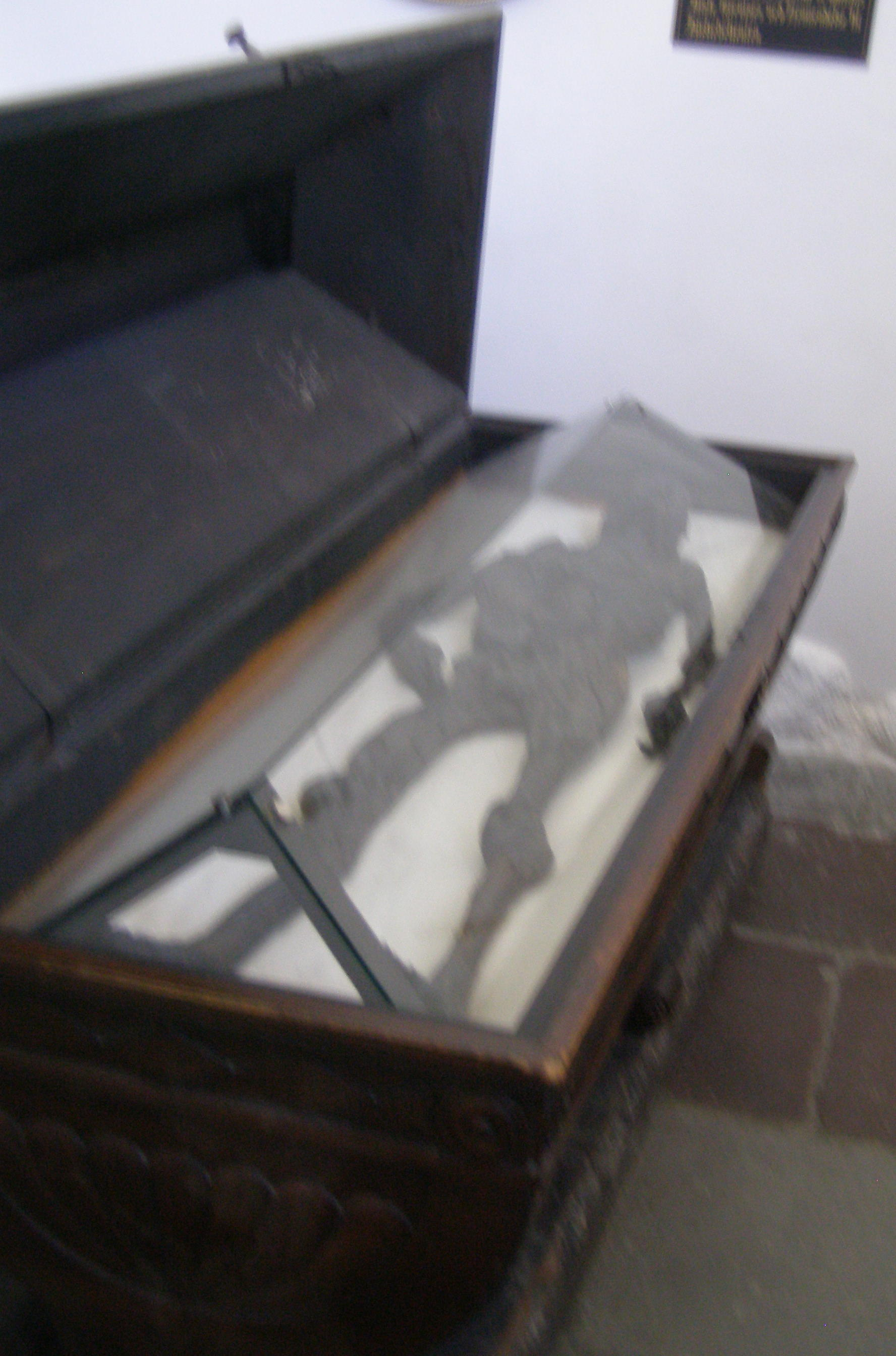
Haraldskær Woman in a glass covered coffin, Vejle, Denmark

According to the Jómsvíkinga saga, Gunnhild returned to Denmark around 977 but was killed at the orders of King Harald by being drowned in a bog. The Ágrip and Theodoricus Monachus's Historia de Antiquitate Regum Norwagiensium contain versions of this account.

In 1835, the body of a murdered or ritually sacrificed woman, the so-called Haraldskær Woman, was unearthed in a bog in Jutland. Because of the account of Gunnhild's murder contained in the Jomsviking Saga and other sources, the body was mistakenly identified as that of Gunnhild. Based upon the belief of her royal personage, King Frederick VI commanded an elaborate sarcophagus be carved to hold her body. This royal treatment of Haraldskær Woman's remains explains the excellent state of conservation of the corpse; conversely, Tollund Man, a later discovery, was not properly conserved and most of the body has been lost, leaving only the head as original material in his display. Later radiocarbon dating demonstrated that the Haraldskær Woman was not Gunnhild, but rather a woman who lived in the 6th century BCE.

== Reputation for Sorcery in the Sagas ==
Gunnhild is often connected with sorcery, as seen throughout the Icelandic sagas. This magical ability may be recognized in part due to Gunnhild's affiliation with the Finns, having supposedly lived in a hut with two Finnish wizards in Finnmark and learned magic from them, according to Snorri in Heimskringla. Also as seen in Heimskringla, Eirík first made the acquaintance of Gunnhild when he was younger and off on a raid in northern Norway. His men had stumbled upon the Finns' hut where she was staying, and described her as "a woman so beautiful that they had never seen the like of her." As stated in Heimskringla, Gunnhild convinced them to hide in the Finns' hut, and then spread the contents of a linen sack both inside and outside of the hut. It is thought that this action was an indication of magic, which upon the Finns' return, caused them to fall asleep without being easily awoken. Gunnhild completed her magic by covering their heads with seal skins, and then directing Eirík's men to kill them, after which they returned to Eirík. Gunnhild's Finnish sojourn is described by historian Marlene Ciklamini as a "fable" designed to set the stage for placing the blame for Eirik's misrule on his wife.

Other sources acting as examples of Gunnhild's sorcery include the story of King Hákon's death in Snorri's Heimskringla, as well as instances concerning Egil in Egil's Saga, and suspicion surrounding the death of Halfdan Haraldsson. Heimskringla describes Hákon's ascent to the Norwegian throne after hearing of the cruelties caused by Eirík's rule. Hákon found great support among the Norwegian people, and therefore forced Eirík and Gunnhild to flee to England. Naturally many battles for the throne ensued, which ultimately led to Gunnhild getting blamed for Hákon's death, when an arrow flew towards him in battle piercing into the muscle of his upper arm. According to Heimskringla, it is stated that "through the sorcery of Gunnhildr a kitchen boy wheeled round, crying: 'Make room for the king's slayer!' and let fly the arrow into the group coming toward him and wounding the king." Marlene Ciklamini reasons that the unusualness of the mortal wound directs the origin to possible sorcery involved, presumably by Gunnhild.

The character of Egil in Egil's Saga is also cursed by being on Gunnhild's bad side after his many transgressions towards the Norwegian court. First attracting her attention and dislike at a feast when he became overly drunk and foolishly killed one of her supporters and after which escaped, Gunnhild placed a curse on Egil, "from ever finding peace in Iceland until she had seen him." This curse of Gunnhild's is presumably the cause for Egil's later desire to travel to England, which was where Gunnhild and Eirík were at the time after being exiled. Egil ended up requesting to receive forgiveness from Eirík and Gunnhild, and was allowed a single night to compose a tributary poem to Eirík, or else face death. Gunnhild's second moment of sorcery in the saga appears later that night, when Egil was apparently distracted from his writing by a bird twittering at the window. This bird is reputed to be Gunnhild, who had shape-shifted into that form, as seen by Egil's companion Arinbjorn, who had "sat down near the attic window where the bird had been sitting, and saw a shape-shifter in the form of a bird leaving the other side of the house."

== Legacy and reputation ==
Carolyne Larrington examines the comparative amount of power Gunnhild held, as well as her overall role as queen within the Norwegian court. Queenship as a concept emerged relatively late in Norway, and as Larrington points out, the most powerful women in Norwegian history were usually king's mothers rather than kings' wives. Gunnhild acts as one of the most important partial exceptions to this rule, as she was influential during both Eirík's and her sons' rules. Gunnhild became increasingly politically active in her own right after her husband, Eirík, died in battle, after which she later returned to Norway where she put her sons in power, and her son Harald on the throne. Gunnhild also arranged her daughter's marriage to the strategically important Earl of Orkney, displaying her awareness for political advantage. Gunnhild remained resilient to maintain power for the rest of her life, acting as Queen Regent to her son Harald, and continuing to be a major deciding factor and source for political advice.

== Appearances in Media ==
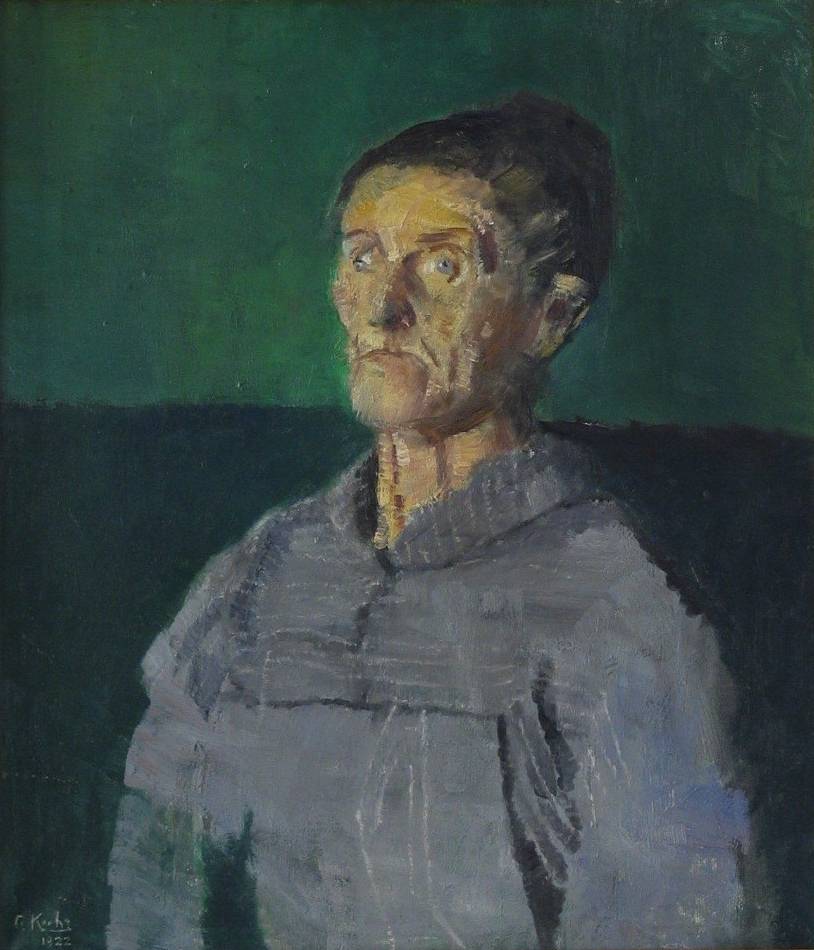
Gunnhild as imagined by Christian Krohg

=== Literature ===
Gunnhild was a villain in Robert Leighton's 1934 novel Olaf the Glorious, a fictionalized biography of Olaf Tryggvason. She is the central character of the 2003 novel Mother of Kings by Poul Anderson, (which makes her a granddaughter of Rognvald Eysteinsson, accepts the version of her living with the Finnish warlocks and emphasizes her being a witch) and also appears in Cecelia Holland's 2002 book The Soul Thief. In The Demon of Scattery (1979) by Poul Anderson and Mildred Downey Broxon, and illustrated by Michael Whelan and Alicia Austin, the main characters, the Viking Halldor and the Irish ex-nun Brigit, become Gunnhild's paternal grandparents. She is a central character in Robert Low's "Crowbone". She is a title character in Genevieve Gornichec's 2023 historical fantasy The Weaver and the Witch Queen. Historian Matthew Firth has authored the first scholarly biography of Queen Gunnhild, scheduled for publication with Arc Humanities Press in February 2027.

=== Television ===
A character by the name of Gunnhild is played by Icelandic actress Ragnheiður Ragnarsdóttir in the television series Vikings. She is loosely based on Gunnhildr konungamóðir, though shares few biographical similarities. The Gunnhild of Vikings is a shield-maiden and wife of Björn Ironside. This storyline differs from the medieval saga tradition concerning Gunnhildr konungamóðir, which associates her with Eric Bloodaxe and the Norwegian royal dynasty. Queen Gunnhild will be portrayed by English actress Jessica Madsen in the Prime Video television series Bloodaxe from 2027.

== Explanatory notes ==
Gunnhild, Mother of Kings
Preceded by Gyda Eiriksdottir	Queen Consort of Norway; 931–934	Succeeded by Tyri of Denmark
