= Maccus =

Maccus is a personal name which is first attested and possibly coined in the tenth century. The name Maccus, later also written as Mac(c)hus, was especially common in the Border country.

== People with the given name ==
- Maccus mac Arailt (fl. 971–974), also Maccus Haraldsson
- Maccus son of Anlaf, named as Eric Bloodaxe's murderer
- Maccus, a minor thane who fought at the Battle of Maldon and is mentioned in the poem of the same name

== Place names ==
- Longformacus (Scottish Gaelic Longphort Maccus)
- Maxton (English Maccuses tun)
- Maxwell(town) (Maccuses wylle).

== In fiction ==
- Maccus or Macchus, a stock character in Atellan Farce and a related figure in puppetry
