= De primo Saxonum adventu =

12th-century historical work

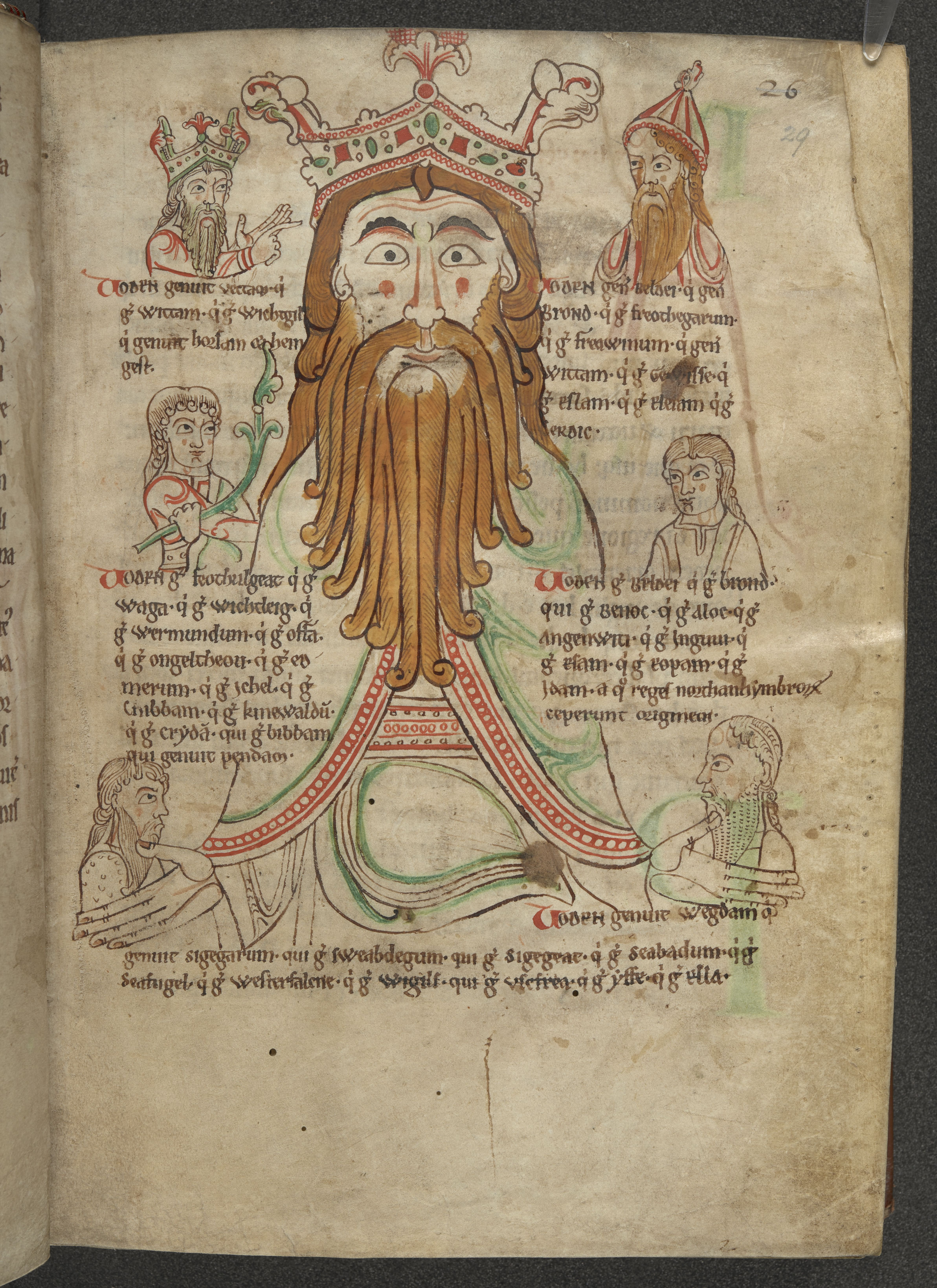
The god Woden, legendary ancestor of several Anglo-Saxon royal lines, as depicted in a copy of De primo Saxonum adventu (British Library Cotton MS Caligula A VIII f. 29r).

De primo Saxonum adventu is a historical work, probably written in Durham during the episcopate of Ranulf Flambard (1099–1128). It recounts the coming of the English (called the "Saxons") to Great Britain, treating individually the history of the rulers of the Kingdom of Kent, the Kingdom of East Anglia, the Kingdom of Northumbria (to Erik Bloodaxe), as well as the archbishops of Canterbury and the archbishops of York, the bishops of Durham and the earls of Northumbria.

Although it exists in many recensions updated in later years, the earliest version contains a list of Durham bishops, ending with Ranulf Flambard. It was written in the time of Symeon of Durham, and thus Symeon may have had a role in the authorship of the text. It appears to be related to a text called the Series regum Northymbrensium, a list of rulers of Northumbria beginning with Ida and ending with Henry I, a text existing only in the manuscript Cambridge University Library, Ff. i.27, one of the ten manuscripts containing the Libellus de exordio.
