= Ozur Toti =

Ozur Toti was a 9th-century Norwegian hersir who lived in Halogaland. In the Heimskringla and Egil's Saga, he is identified as the father of Gunnhild Mother of Kings, the wife and queen of Erik Bloodaxe, though elsewhere she is identified as a daughter of Gorm the Old.

Heimskringla and Egil's Saga both assert that Gunnhild was Ozur's daughter. Accounts of her early life vary between sources. Egil's Saga relates that "Eirik fought a great battle on the Northern Dvina in Bjarmaland, and was victorious as the poems about him record. On the same expedition he obtained Gunnhild, the daughter of Ozur Toti, and brought her home with him."

Egil's Saga names two sons of Ozur, Eyvind the Shabby and Alf Askman, and relates that they became hirdmen of Erik's.
