= Arinbjarnarkviða =

Skaldic poem by Egill Skallagrímsson

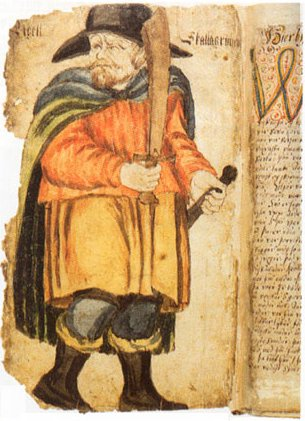
Egil Skallagrimsson 17c manuscript.

Arinbjarnarkviða, Ode to Arinbjörn, is a skaldic poem by Egill Skalla-Grímsson in praise of his friend Arinbjörn. The poem is preserved in Möðruvallabók but not in other manuscripts of Egils saga. Some lines are lost while others may be corrupted. The metre is kviðuháttr.

An anthology of Icelandic poetry translated into English by Bernard Scudder briefly describes this poem. It states Arinbjörn was an ally of Egill and was the person that advised him to compose Hǫfuðlausn, Head Ransom in English, which saved his life when he was held captive by king Eirik Bloodaxe. Egill heard that Arinbjörn had returned to Norway, so he composed this poem praising him and sent it to him.
