= Mother of Kings =

2001 novel by Poul Anderson

- First edition cover Cover art by Charles Keegan
- Author: Poul Anderson
- Publisher: Tor Books
- Publication date: October 1, 2001
- ISBN: 0-312-87448-0

Mother of Kings is a historical novel by American writer Poul Anderson, first published in 2001 by Tor Books. The book is an account of the life of Gunnhild, Mother of Kings, a tenth-century queen of Norway and wife of King Eirik Bloodaxe. It is based largely on the accounts of Gunnhild's life given in Egil's Saga and Heimskringla.

The book has considerable fantasy elements, taking place in a universe in which magic exists. The plot accepts the version that in her teens Gunnhild learned magic from two Finnish wizards, and became an accomplished witch – including the ability to shape-shift and turn herself into a bird at will – and that she often used her magical abilities maliciously, in order to hurt her and her husband's enemies. Except for the magical elements, however, Anderson keeps to the known historical facts of 10th-century Scandinavia and England.

Eirik Bloodaxe had a bad reputation in his lifetime and later, being considered especially violent and aggressive even by the standards of the Viking Age. His bad traits were sometimes blamed on the "bad influence" of his wife, and this attitude is evident in some of the extant sources. In his own version, Anderson describes several morally questionable acts by Gunnhild – but still, carefully notes her own point of view and her reasons to do as she did.

== Publication details ==
- Anderson, Poul. Mother of Kings. New York: Tor (ISBN 0-765-34502-1, ISBN 978-0-7653-4502-8), 2001, 2003.
