= Nithing pole =

Germanic pagan item

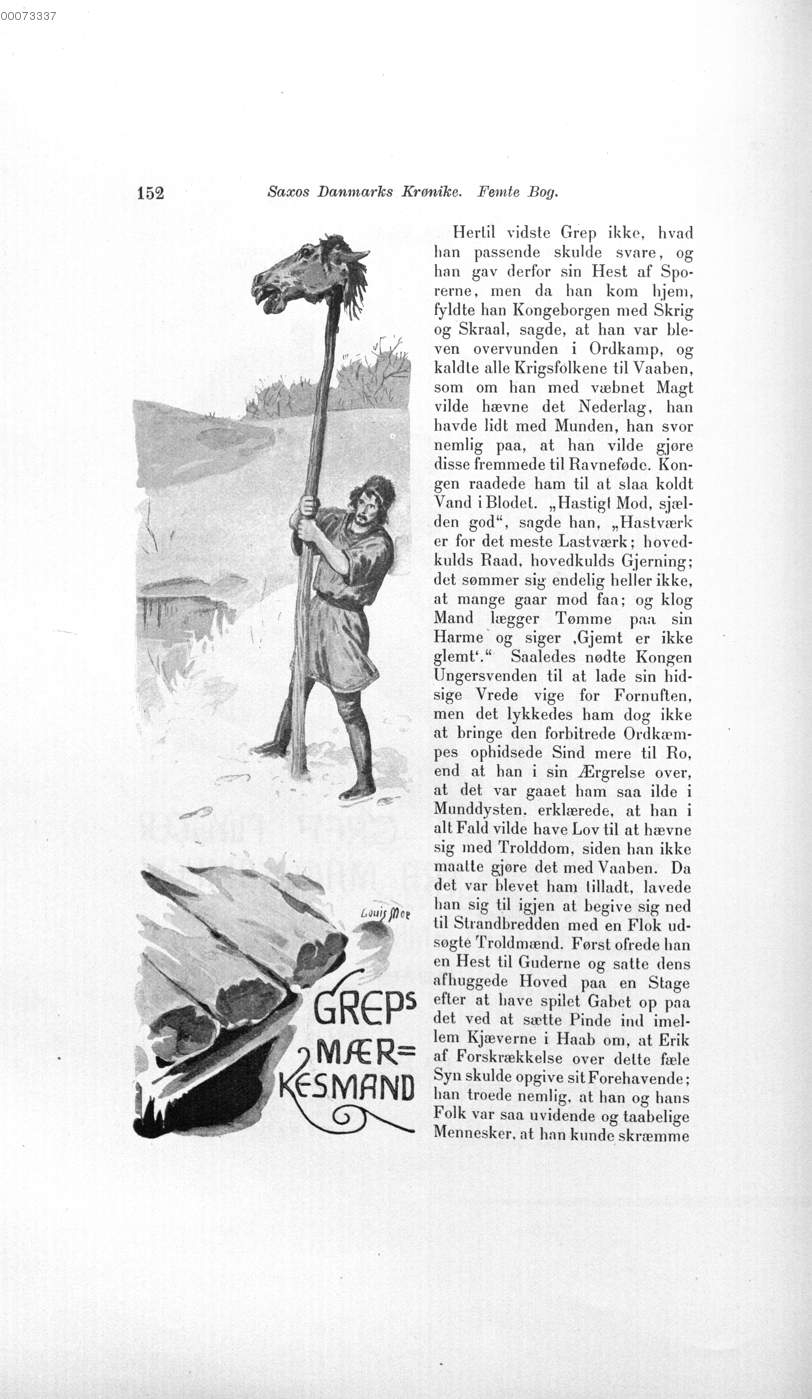
Saxo Grammaticus: Danmarks Krønike (Gesta Danorum) - tr. Frederik Winkel Horn (Danish) - illust. Louis Moe (1898)

A nithing pole (Old Norse: níðstǫng), sometimes normalized as nithstang or nidstang, was a pole used for cursing an enemy in Germanic pagan tradition (nīþ, nith).

== Historical use ==
A nithing pole consisted of a long, wooden pole with a recently cut horse head at the end, and at times with the skin of the horse laid over the pole. The nithing pole was directed towards the enemy and target of the curse. The curse could be carved in runes on the pole.

=== Attestations ===
A nithing pole event appears in Egils saga:

"And when all was ready for sailing, Egil went up into the island. He took in his hand a hazel-pole, and went to a rocky eminence that looked inward to the mainland. Then he took a horse's head and fixed it on the pole. After that, in solemn form of curse, he thus spake: 'Here set I up a curse-pole, and this curse I turn on king Eric and queen Gunnhilda. (Here he turned the horse's head landwards.) This curse I turn also on the guardian-spirits who dwell in this land, that they may all wander astray, nor reach or find their home till they have driven out of the land king Eric and Gunnhilda.' This spoken, he planted the pole down in a rift of the rock, and let it stand there. The horse's head he turned inwards to the mainland; but on the pole he cut runes, expressing the whole form of curse." - Egils Saga, Chapter LX (60)

The Icelandic Vatnsdæla saga records that when Finbogi failed to show up for a hólmganga (duel), Jökul raised a nithing pole against Finbogi for his cowardice by carving out a human head which was placed on a post with magic runes, killing a mare, and then placing the post into the mare's breast with the head facing towards Finbogi's dwelling.

== Contemporary use ==
In Iceland, there are modern examples of a nithing pole being raised. It is thought that the tradition has continued unbroken since the settlement of Iceland. A notable example occurred in 2006, when a farmer in Bíldudalur, claiming direct descent from Egill Skallagrímsson, raised a pole with a calf's head attached against another local man with a note attached to the effect that he would not rest until the man was either outlawed or dead. The reason the nithing pole was raised was that the man had run over the former's puppy. The matter was reported to the police as a death threat.

In 2006 a local politician in Norway raised several sheep-head nithing poles in protest of a local election.

Improvised nithing poles with dried cod heads were used during the April 4, 2016, demonstration against Icelandic Prime Minister Sigmundur Davíð Gunnlaugsson.

On April 3, 2020, a nithing pole with two svið was put up in front of the Alþingi in Iceland. A sign on the pole cited that the government had been allegedly treating predominantly female working classes poorly, for example, by lowering the pay of nurses during the COVID-19 pandemic. The pole claimed to turn that around on the Alþingi with the curse.

On April 29, 2022, a nithing pole was discovered and reported to police at Skrauthólum in Iceland. It was set nearby the property of the director of the Icelandic Equestrian Association, and the target of the nithing pole may be a local new-age-group Sólsetrið for being disruptive to the neighborhood.

== See also ==
- Ceremonial pole
- Hoodening
- Horse sacrifice
- Horses in Germanic paganism
- Nīþ
