= Hǫfuðlausn (Egill) =

Poem attributed to Egill Skalla-Grímsson

Hǫfuðlausn (modern Icelandic pronunciation: [ˈhœːvʏðˌlœystn̥]) or ‘Head-ransom' is a skaldic poem attributed to Egill Skalla-Grímsson in praise of king Eric Bloodaxe.

It is cited in Egil's Saga (chapter 61), which claims that he created it in the span of one night. The events in the saga that lead up to the composition and recitation of the poem can be summarized in the following way. Egil falls into king Eirik's hands after being shipwrecked in Northumbria. Faced with the decision to either dishonorably flee and risk being exposed as a coward or to directly face his adversary and ask for reconciliation, Egil chooses the latter. The two men are enemies during the saga, which makes Egil's decision especially bold. Earlier in the saga Egil goes as far as to construct a Nithing pole, a sign of disrespect in medieval Scandinavian society. For this and other reasons King Eirik tells Egil not to expect any outcome other than death for his arrival in his court. This would be the end for Egil, however, one of his allies, who has allegiance to Eirik, intercedes on Egil's behalf. Arinbjǫrn hersir tells the king that it would be dishonorable to kill his enemy under such circumstances. Furthermore he states that Egil, also a renowned poet, "can make recompense with words of praise that will live for ever." This argument along with it being considered scornful to kill during the night, convinces Eirik to delay his judgement until the next day. During the night Egil composes and memorizes the entire poetic drápa known as the Head Ransom. He recites it in the presence of the king Eiríkr and receives his freedom, but not any sort of reconciliation. The two remain enemies and Egil continues on his original journey to visit king Æthelstan of England.

If the poem is authentic it constitutes the second use of end-rhyme in the northern artistic tradition. The first time was a stanza by Egil's father, which is widely believed to have been written by Egil himself.
