= Eric Bloodaxe =

10th-century King of Norway and Northumbria

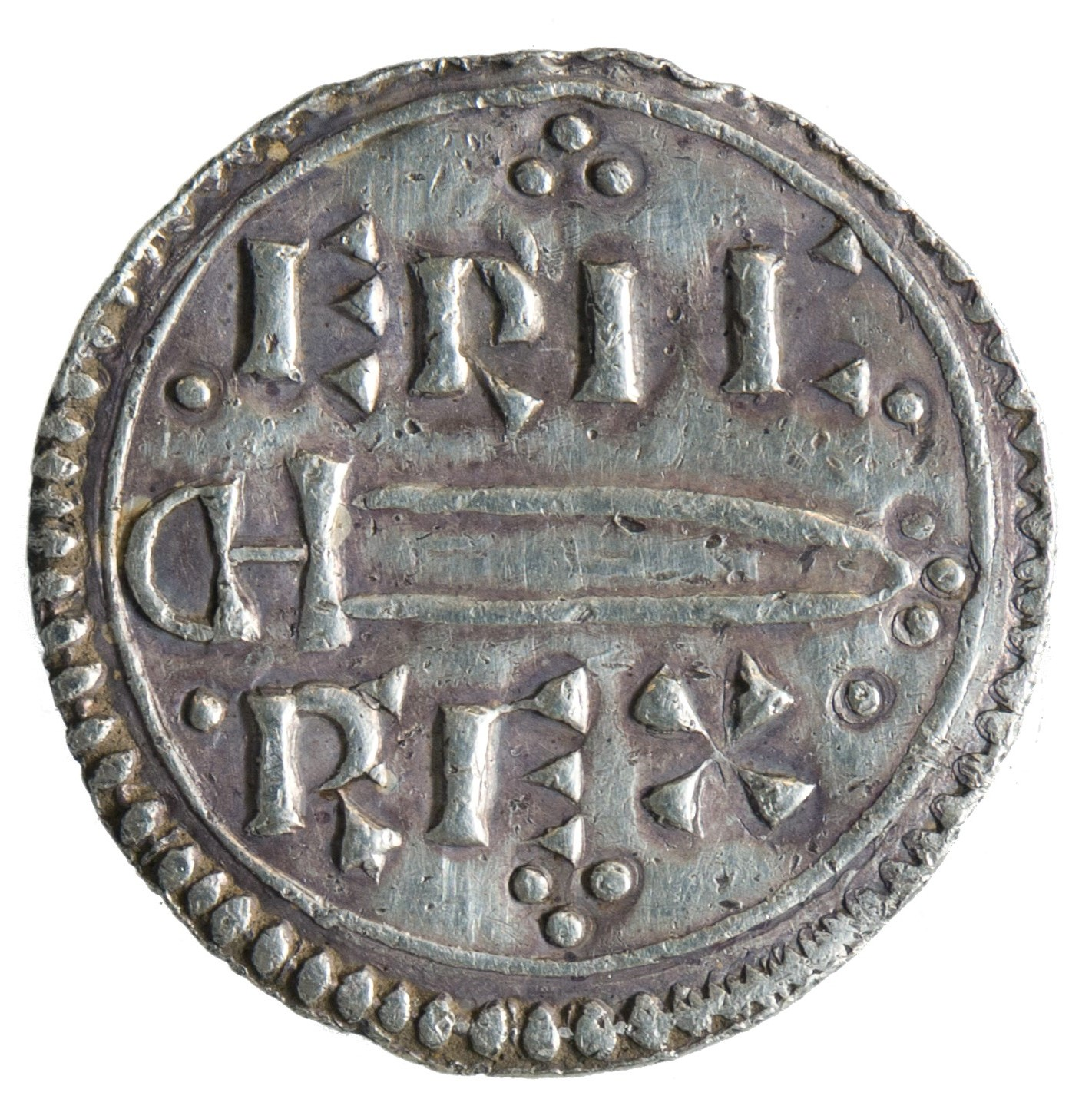
- Silver penny of Eric Bloodaxe, which reads "ERIC REX"

King of Norway
- Reign: 931–933
- Predecessor: Harald I
- Successor: Haakon I

King of Northumbria
- Reign: 947–948; 952–954
- Predecessor: Edmund I; Amlaíb Cuarán
- Successor: Amlaíb Cuarán; Eadred
- Died: c. 954; Stainmore, Scandinavian York
- Spouse: Gunnhild, Mother of Kings
- Dynasty: Fairhair
- Father: Harald Fairhair
- Mother: Ragnhild the Mighty

Eric Haraldsson (Old Norse: Eiríkr Haraldsson [ˈɛiˌriːkz̠ ˈhɑrˌɑldsˌson], Norwegian: Eirik Haraldsson; fl. c.930−954), nicknamed Bloodaxe (Old Norse: blóðøx [ˈbloːðˌøks], Norwegian: Blodøks) and Brother-Slayer (Latin: fratrum interfector), was a Norwegian king. He ruled as King of Norway from 932 to 934, and twice as King of Northumbria: from 947 to 948, and again from 952 to 954.

== Sources ==
Historians have reconstructed a narrative of Eric's life and career from the scant available historical data. There is a distinction between contemporary or near contemporary sources for Eric's period as ruler of Northumbria and the entirely saga-based sources that detail the life of Eric of Norway, a chieftain who ruled the Norwegian Westland in the 930s. Norse sources have identified the two as the same since the late 12th century, and while the subject is controversial, most historians have identified the two figures as the same since W. G. Collingwood's article in 1901. This identification was rejected early in the 21st century by the historian Clare Downham, who has argued that later Norse writers synthesized the two Erics, possibly using English sources. This argument, though respected by other historians in the area, has not produced consensus.

Contemporary or near-contemporary sources include different recensions of the Anglo-Saxon Chronicle, Eric's coinage, the Life of St Cathróe, and possibly skaldic poetry. Such sources reproduce only a hazy image of Eric's activities in Anglo-Saxon England.

Strikingly, Eric's historical obscurity stands in sharp contrast to the wealth of legendary depictions in the kings' sagas, in which he takes part in the sagas of his father Harald Fairhair and his younger half-brother Haakon the Good. These include the late 12th-century Norwegian synoptics – Historia Norwegiæ (perhaps c. 1170), Theodoricus monachus' Historia de antiquitate regum Norwagiensium (c. 1180), and Ágrip af Nóregskonungasögum (c. 1190) – and the later Icelandic kings' sagas Orkneyinga saga (c. 1200), Fagrskinna (c. 1225), the Heimskringla ascribed to Snorri Sturluson (c. 1230), Egils saga (1220–1240), and Óláfs saga Tryggvasonar en mesta (c. 1300). Exactly in what sense the Eric of the sagas may have been based on the historical Eric of Northumbria, and conversely, to what extent later evidence might be called upon to shed light on the historical figure, are matters which have inspired a variety of approaches and suggestions among generations of historians. Current opinion veers towards a more critical attitude towards the use of sagas as historical sources for the period before the 11th century, but conclusive answers cannot be offered.

== Epithet ==
Eric's soubriquet blóðøx, ‘Bloodaxe’ or 'Bloody-axe', is of uncertain origin and context. It is arguable whether its preservation in two lausavísur by Egill Skallagrímsson and a contemporary skald genuinely dates to the 10th century or had been inserted at some stage when Eric was becoming the focus of legend. There is no guarantee that it significantly predates the 12th-century narrative tradition, where it is first attached to him in Ágrip and in Latin translation as sanguinea securis in the Historia Norwegiæ. The sagas usually explain it as referring to Eric's slaying of his half-brothers in a ruthless struggle to monopolise his rule over Norway; Theodoricus gives the similar nickname fratrum interfector (killer of brothers or brother-bane). Fagrskinna, on the other hand, ascribes it to Eric's violent reputation as a Viking raider.

== Family background ==
=== Father ===
The Anglo-Saxon Chronicle (MS E) describes Eric laconically as ‘Harold’s son’ (Haroldes sunu). In the early part of the 12th century, John of Worcester had reason to believe that Eric (Yrcus) was of royal Scandinavian stock (Danica stirpe progenitum, a phrase used earlier for the Hiberno-Norse ruler of Northumbria, Sihtric Cáech).

This appears to match with independent tradition from Norwegian synoptic histories and Icelandic sagas, which are explicit in identifying Eric of Northumbria as a son of the Norwegian king Harald (I) Fairhair. The skaldic poems ascribed to Egill Skallagrímsson may offer further reassurance that the sagas are on the right track, although doubts have been expressed about the date and integrity of the verses in the form in which they have survived. One of Egill's lausavísur speaks of an encounter in England with a man of "Harald's line" (Haralds áttar), while the Arinbjarnarkviða envisages a ruler at York (Jórvik) who is a descendant of Halfdán (Halfdanar) and of the Yngling dynasty (ynglings burar). If genuine, the latter identification would form the only direct clue in the contemporary record which might link Eric with the Norwegian dynasty.

Another Harald known from this period is Aralt mac Sitric (d. 940), king of Limerick, the probable father of Maccus and Gofraid. This may be relevant, since both these brothers and a certain Eric have been described as rulers of 'the Isles' (Hebrides) (see below). In a letter addressed to Pope Boniface VIII, King Edward I (r. 1272–1307) remembered a certain Eric (Yricius) as having been a king of Scotland subject to the English king.

In the 19th century, a case had also been made for Harald Bluetooth King of Denmark (d. 985) as being Eric's true father. J.M. Lappenberg and Charles Plummer, for instance, identified Eric with Harald's son Hiring. The only authority for this son's existence is Adam of Bremen, who in his Gesta (c. 1070) claims to cite the otherwise unknown Gesta Anglorum for a remarkable anecdote about Hiring's foreign adventures: "Harald sent his son Hiring to England with an army. When the latter had subjugated the island, he was in the end betrayed and killed by the Northumbrians." Even if Eric's rise and fall had been the inspiration for the story, the names are not identical and Harald Bluetooth's floruit does not sit well with Eric's.

=== A brother? ===
In the account cited in the Latin text of the North Sagas entitled, Morte Rex Eilricus (The death of King Eirikr) which had been copied long ago from the annals of the lost York Chronicles, the author provides the details of the events leading to Eric (Eirikr or Eirik) Bloodaxe's death "fraudulently, treacherously betrayed by Earl Osulfus" (Osulf, Earl of Bamburg) "... was killed by Earl Maccus ... at the Battle of Steinmor ... and there fell Eirikr, with his sons and brothers and all his army ... and his brother Reginaldus [Latin for Ragnald or Ragnvald] ... His son was also known as: Henricus or Haericus [Latin form] and brother as Ragnald or Reginaldus [Latin form] ... together with his son Henricus" whom the commentator Michael Wood in 1981 documentary TV series "In Search of the Dark Ages" (in the episode "In Search of Eric Bloodaxe") identifies as 'Harékr' (from the Latin Haeric or Henricus or Haericus) "and brother Ragnald" (from the Latin Reginaldus). Historians have been struck by the correspondence with these names in Fagrskinna, which says two of the kings who died with Eric in his final battle against Osulf (Olaf) were called Harékr and Ragnvald, although they are not identified as relatives there they certainly are identified as his son (cum filio – meaning: 'with his son') and his brother (et fratre – meaning: 'and [his] brother') in the North Sagas.

=== Mother and half-brothers (sagas) ===
Further details on his family background are provided solely by the Icelandic and Norwegian sources of the 12th and 13th centuries, which are of limited and uncertain historical value and should therefore be treated with due circumspection. Harald 'Fairhair' is usually portrayed as a polygamous and virile king, the number of his sons varying between 16 and 20. While Eric's mother remains anonymous in the synoptic histories (Ágrip) and most of the Icelandic sagas, the Heimskringla (c. 1230) claims that she was Ragnhildr, daughter of Eric, king of (South) Jutland. The possibility that Harald had married a Danish princess may find some support in a skaldic stanza which is usually assigned to Þorbjörn Hornklofi's Hrafnsmál, a eulogy on Harald's deeds in the form of a conversation between a raven and valkyrie. It tells that Harald "chose the lady from Denmark [konu danska] / broke with his Rogaland loves / and his lemans of Horthaland, / the maidens of Hálogaland / and of Hathaland eke." In the Flateyjarbók, it is preceded by another stanza which refers to the "handmaidens of Ragnhildr" (ambáttir Ragnhildar) as witnesses of the event. However, it is uncertain whether her name was already in the original composition, as another manuscript reading has the metrically regular ambáttir Danskar. The account of Heimskringla, which claims that Harald had enjoyed the company of eleven consorts before Ragnhildr, and that of Egils saga are at variance with the suggestion elsewhere that Eric was one of the oldest (Fagrskinna), if not the eldest son of Harald (Historia Norwegiæ, Ágrip). Whatever one makes of the discrepancy, the sagas – including Heimskringla – are unanimous in making Haakon Eric's younger half-brother and successor.

== Early career (sagas) ==
According to Heimskringla and Egils saga, Eric spent much of his childhood in fosterage with the hersir Thórir son of Hróald. Of his adolescent years, a remarkable picture is painted in Heimskringla, which recounts that Eric, aged twelve and seemingly possessed of prodigious valour and strength, embarked on a career of international piracy: four years were spent harrying the Baltic coasts and those of Denmark, Frisia and Germany ('Saxland'); another four years those of Scotland, Wales, Ireland and France; and lastly, Lappland and Bjarmaland (in what is now northern Russia). Describing the last trip, Egils saga notes that Eric sailed up the Dvina River into the Russian hinterland of Permia, where he sacked the small trading port of Permina.

== Marriage ==
The Life of St Cathróe of Metz, written c. 1000 at the latest and therefore of near contemporary value, has information about Eric and his wife. It relates that "after keeping him for some time", the King of the Cumbrians conducted Cathróe to Loidam Civitatem, the boundary between the Normanni ("Scandinavians") and the Cumbri ("Britons"):

And there he was received by a certain nobleman, Gunderic, by whom he was led to king Erichius in the town of York, because this king had as wife a relative of the godly Cathróe

Given what is known of Cathróe's own background, this probably means that she was of British ("Cumbrian") or Scottish descent. This contradicts to some extent later saga tradition. According to the early 13th century Egils saga, Eric's consort at York was Gunnhild, the famous "mother of kings". This account was constructed by the author of Egils saga using an earlier poem called Arinbjarnarkviða "Lay of Arinbjörn", and this poem does not mention Gunnhild by name, implying therefore that the name was introduced by the author of Egils saga.

Saga tradition is, however, unanimous that Eric did cohabit with a woman named Gunnhild. Her name occurs in a handful of Egill's lausavísur. The earliest saga, Historia Norwegiæ, describes her as the daughter of Gorm inn Gamli (‘the Old’), king of Denmark (and hence a sister of Harald Bluetooth). Most subsequent accounts name her father Ozur, nicknamed either Toti "teat" (Egils saga, Fagrskinna, Heimskringla) or lafskegg "dangling beard" (Ágrip, Fagrskinna), a man who hailed from the northern province of Hålogaland (Egils saga, Heimskringla). Icelandic hostility towards Gunnhild has been cited as a possible source for her dissociation from the Danish royal house.

There is no consensus on how to solve this problem. An early suggestion is that the name for the king in York in the Life of Cathróe has been erroneously supplanted for Eric's predecessor Amlaíb Cuarán (Olaf Sihtricsson), whose (second) wife Dúnflaith was an Irishwoman. In 2004, Clare Downham suggested that Erichius, Eric of Northumbria, is not the same as Eric Bloodaxe. And there remains the possibility that he was not strictly monogamous, and the existence of two wives need not be mutually exclusive.

== King of Norway (sagas) ==
The dominant theme of the sagas about Harald's numerous sons is the struggle for the Norwegian throne, in particular the way it manifests itself in the careers of Haakon and his foil Eric. According to Heimskringla, Harald had appointed his sons as client kings over the various districts of the kingdom, and intended Eric, his favourite son, to inherit the throne after his death. At strife with his half-brothers, Eric brutally killed Ragnvald (Rögnvaldr), ruler of Hadeland on his father's orders, and Bjørn Farmann, ruler of Vestfold. Some texts maintain that towards the end of his life, Harald allowed Eric to reign together with him (Heimskringla, Ágrip, Fagrskinna). When Harald died, Eric succeeded to the realm, slaughtered the combined forces of his half-brothers Olaf and Sigrød, and gained full control of Norway. At the time, however, Eric's younger and most famous half-brother Haakon, often nicknamed Aðalsteinsfóstri, had been staying at the West-Saxon court, having been sent there to be reared as fosterson to King Æthelstan (r. 924–939). Eric's rule was reputedly harsh and despotic and so he fell rapidly out of favour with the Norwegian nobility. At this propitious time, Haakon returned to Norway, found a nobility eager to accept him as king instead and ousted Eric, who fled to Britain. Heimskringla specifies that Haakon owed his success in large part to Sigurd, earl of Lade.

Determining the date and length of Eric's reign (before and after his father's death) is a challenging and perhaps impossible task based on the confused chronology of our late sources. It is also unfortunate that no contemporary or even near contemporary record survives for Eric's short-lived rule in Norway, if it is historical at all.

== Jarls of Orkney (sagas) ==
The Norse sagas differ in the way they treat the manner and route by which Eric first came to Britain after he was forced out of Norway. The synoptic histories offer the most concise accounts. Theodoricus goes straight for Eric's arrival in England, his welcome there by King Æthelstan, his brief rule and his death soon afterwards. Similarly, the Historia Norwegiæ makes him flee directly to England, where he was received by his half-brother Haakon, baptised and given charge of Northumbria by Æthelstan. When Eric's rule became intolerable, he was driven out and slain on an expedition in Spain. Ágrip tells that he came to Denmark first. According to Historia Norwegiæ, it would have been his wife's native country and hence a power base where he might have expected to muster some support, but the text makes no such claims.

However, later sagas greatly expand upon Eric's activities in the interim between his reigns in Norway and Northumbria, claiming that he initially adopted a predatory lifestyle of raiding, whether or not he was aiming for a more political line of business in the longer run. The jarldom of Orkney, the former Viking base subjected and annexed by Eric's father, came to loom large in these stages of the literary development. Fagrskinna (c. 1220) mentions his daughter Ragnhild and her marriage to an Orkney earl, here Hávard, but never describes Eric as actually stepping ashore. The Orkneyinga saga, written c. 1200, does speak of his presence in Orkney and his alliance with the joint jarls Arnkel and Erland, sons of Torf-Einarr, but not until his rule in Northumbria was challenged by Olaf (Amlaíb Cuarán). However, a number of later sagas such as the Separate Saga of St. Olaf (c. 1225), Heimskringla, Egils saga and Óláfs saga Tryggvasonar en mesta assert that he sailed directly to Orkney, where he took the joint jarls into vassalage, collected forces and so set up a base which enabled him to organise several expeditions in overseas territory. Named targets include Ireland, the Hebrides, Scotland and England. Eric sealed the alliance by giving his daughter Ragnhild in marriage to the future earl of Orkney, Arnfinn, son of Thorfinn Turf-Einarsson.

== King of Northumbria ==
It is when Eric gains the kingship in Northumbria that he finally steps more firmly into the historical limelight, even though the sources provide only scanty detail and present notorious problems of their own. The historical sources – e.g., versions A-F of the Anglo-Saxon Chronicle, Historia regum and Roger of Wendover's Historia Anglorum – tend to be reticent and the chronology is confused. However, the best chronological guideline appears to be that offered by the Worcester Chronicle, i.e., the D-text of the Anglo-Saxon Chronicle.

The Northumbria on which he set foot was one which had been bitterly fought over between the West-Saxon kings and the Hiberno-Norse line of descendants from Ímair, kings of Dublin. The Northumbrians' own position in the middle of the struggle may have been complex and the outcome was variable, leading an unsympathetic historian like Henry of Huntingdon to judge harshly "their usual faithlessness" (solita infidelitas).

=== Historical background ===
==== Æthelstan ====
In 927, having ejected Gofraid ua Ímair from York, King Æthelstan brought Northumbria under English control. His victory in the Battle of Brunanburh in 937, in which he and his half-brother Edmund defeated Gofraid's son King Olaf (III) Guthfrithson of Dublin, seems to have had the effect of consolidating his power. This impression is borne out by royal charters issued towards the end of his reign, between 937 and 939, which style Æthelstan ruler over all Britain (e.g., totius rex Brittanniae or Albionis).

==== Edmund and the two Olafs ====
The Five Boroughs and the English Midlands in the earlier part of the 10th century

However, Æthelstan died in 939 and his successor Edmund, only 18 years of age, was unable to retain control of Northumbria. In 939 or 940, almost as soon as Edmund had come to power, a new ruler of the Uí Ímair dynasty had made York his seat. From Irish annals it is known that Edmund's old rival Olaf Guthfrithson left Dublin in 939 (Annals of the Four Masters), that in 940 his cousin, known in Ireland as Amlaíb Cuarán and in England as Olaf Sihtricsson, joined him in York (Annals of the Four Masters, Annals of Clonmacnoise) and that Olaf Guthfrithson died in 941 (Annals of Clonmacnoise, Chronicon Scotorum), while the Anglo-Saxon Chronicle (MS E) dates his death – incorrectly it seems – to 942. Amlaíb Cuarán succeeded him and did so with popular support, as the Anglo-Saxon Chronicle (MS D) reports that in 941, "the Northumbrians belied their pledges, and chose Olaf [i.e., Amlaíb Cuarán] from Ireland as their king." Amlaíb shared the throne with his nephew Ragnald (Rögnvaldr), son of Gofraid. There are indications that Wulfstan, Archbishop of York and a leading statesman in Northumbrian politics, played a key role in Amlaíb's support, although he would later change his mind (see below). In 942 Edmund struck back with a recapture of Mercia and the Five Boroughs of Danelaw, which so impressed contemporaries that a poem was written in honour of the achievement and included in the Chronicle. In response, Amlaíb launched a successful raid on Tamworth (Mercia), probably sometime later that year. However, in 943, when Amlaíb had marched on to Leicester, one of the Boroughs, he and Wulfstan were besieged by Edmund and managed to escape only by a hair's breadth. Peace negotiations followed later that year to the effect that Edmund accepted Amlaíb as an ally and as two northern sources add, ceded to him Northumbria as far south as Watling Street. Later, Edmund stood sponsor to him at baptism and to Ragnall at confirmation. In 944, however, Northumbria passed into West-Saxon hands again as Edmund drove out both Viking rulers. The chronicler Æthelweard is clearer on the point of agency, writing that it was Wulfstan and the ealdorman (dux) of the Mercians who deposed these 'deserters' – perhaps born again pagans – and forced them to submit to Edmund. The same year, Edmund raided Cumbria and entrusted it to Malcolm I of Scotland in exchange for support "both on sea and on land". The Irish annals report that in 945, Amlaíb was back in Dublin and an anonymous ruler at York, possibly Ragnald (Rögnvaldr), died. Edmund was described as rex totiusque Albionis primicerius in one of his charters, but did not live long enough to enjoy his renewed hold on the northern zone. He was killed in 946.

=== Eric's first reign (947/8–948) ===
When Eadred succeeded to the throne in 946, Northumbrian as well as Scottish loyalties had proved unstable, though nothing is known for certain of the ambitions of rival rulers at this stage. Eadred "reduced all the land of Northumbria to his control; and the Scots granted him oaths that they would do all that he wanted." Moreover, in 947 he convened Archbishop Wulfstan and the Northumbrian witan at Tanshelf (now in Pontefract, West Yorkshire), on the boundary of the Humber (near an old Roman road), where they pledged their obedience to him. What perceived threat was being countered remains unclear, but English rule does not seem to have been very warmly received.

In any event, the Chronicle (MS D) notes that the Northumbrians soon violated their pledges and oaths (947) and records a definite outcome of their disloyalty in 948, by which time "they had taken Eirik [Yryc] for their king". That year, King Eadred harshly punished the northern defectors by launching a destructive raid on Northumbria, which notably included burning the Ripon minster founded by St Wilfrid. Although Eadred's forces had to sustain heavy losses in the Battle of Castleford (Ceaster forda) – near Tanshelf – as they returned southwards, Eadred managed to check his rival by promising the latter's supporters even greater havoc if they did not desert Eric. The Northumbrians preferred to appease the English king, renounced Eric and paid compensation.

The Chronicle of the Kings of Alba records that shortly thereafter, in 948 or 949, Malcolm (I) of Scotland and Cumbria, at Constantine's instigation, raided Northumbria as far south as the River Tees and returned with many cattle and captives. Marios Costambeys suggests that it "may have been directed against, or mounted in favour of, Eirik, though the protagonist could just as easily have been Óláf Sihtricson."

=== Eric's second reign (952–954) ===
Eric's removal cleared the way for Amlaíb [Anlaf Cwiran], who having suffered defeat at Slane (Co. Meath, Ireland) in 947, returned to Northumbria and took the kingship, supposedly in 949, if the E-text is to be trusted. Eadred does not appear to have undertaken any significant action and may even have turned a blind eye on his brother's godson, or so at least the silence of the sources appears to suggest.

The E-text reports, however, that in 952, "the Northumbrians drove out King Olaf and accepted Eric, son of Harold." The Annals of Ulster for the same year report a victory of the "foreigners", i.e., the Northmen or the Norse-Gaels, over "the men of Scotland and the Welsh [Bretnu, i.e., Britons of Strathclyde] and the Saxons." Exactly what this succinct account may tell us of his second rise to power, if anything, is frustratingly unclear. He may have led the Viking forces in a second bid for the throne, or only returned from the sideline to exploit the ravages of defeat. His reign proved once again of a short duration, since in 954 (a date on which MSS D and E agree), the Northumbrians expelled him, too.

Clare Downham notes the existence of an otherwise unrecorded Eltangerht, whose coins were minted at York and date from about the same time, but nothing is known of him from other records.

=== Archbishop Wulfstan and the charters ===
The nature of Eric's relationship with Archbishop Wulfstan, the leading Northumbrian churchman who played such a decisive role in Amlaíb's career in the early 940s, remains tantalisingly unclear. One might assume that Wulfstan, given his political eminence, headed the Northumbrian party which elected Eric. It has likewise been suggested that Eadred's punitive attack on the ancient minster of Ripon, which carried little military weight, was targeted at Wulfstan in particular. In what sense his deposition in 948 may have affected the relationship in later years is more open to speculation.

The witness lists of Anglo-Saxon charters, which reveal when or not Wulfstan attended Eadred's court, in his own right or as a diplomat intermediating between two kings, have been used to provide a chronological framework for Wulfstan's swerving loyalties. Between 938 and 941, that is roughly between the Battle of Brunanburh (937) and the recovery of the Five Boroughs (942), the archbishop did not attest any royal charters, but he began to do so during or after the negotiations of 942. What the charters reveal for Eric's first reign is less clear-cut, but intermittent absence may explain gaps in the record for Wulfstan's attestations in the turbulent years 947–948. Unfortunately, the critical period between 950 and 954 has produced comparatively few charters (owing perhaps to Eadred's deteriorating health), but what little there is may be instructive. Wulfstan is still seen at court in 950, but of the five charters which were issued in 951, not one was attested by him, which once again may imply his backing of Amlaíb. Eric's reign (952–954) is more obscure. We do know, however, that in 952, the same year that Eric began his second term at York, Wulfstan was arrested and stood on trial in Iudanbyrig (unknown) on account of several unspecified allegations which had been repeatedly brought before Eadred. Of the few charters surviving for 953, Wulfstan attests one and by 955, after Eric's death, he was restored to office, but now with Dorchester rather than York as his episcopal seat. Clare Downham suggests that during this period, Wulfstan may have been pressured by King Eadred into relinquishing his support of Eric.

=== Coinage ===
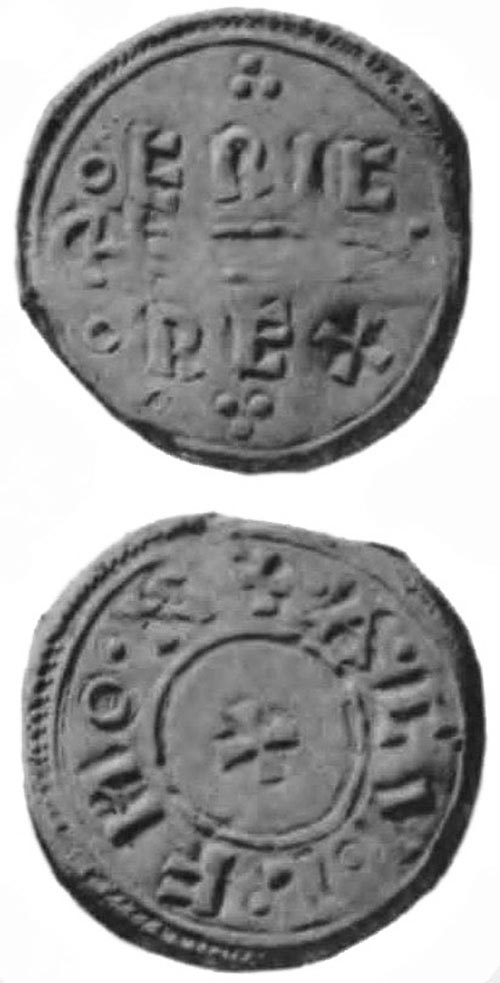
Coin minted at York, type N550, ECM 2007.0059. Obverse: ERIC RE[X] (King Eric). Reverse: [R]ADVLF MON[] (moneyer Radulf).

Eric's Northumbrian rule is also corroborated by numismatic evidence. As of 3 February 2009, 31 coins minted at York had been found which bear the inscription of his name. These can be divided into two distinct types of issue: N549, in which the moneyer's name (reverse) is written horizontally and broken up in two, and N550, in which his name is inscribed around the edges and Eric's name (obverse) accompanied by a sword symbol (Sword of St.Peter) (image above on the right). The two principal moneyers, Ingalger and Radulf, who had also minted coins for Amlaíb, occur on both types. The two types may correspond to his two reigns, but it is not out of the question that both were issued during a single reign.

=== Life of St Cathróe ===
Eric's sudden appearance in the Chronicle, first noted by the D-text, is a puzzling one, lacking any information as to how or why he emerged on the scene. As hinted above, the Life of the Scottish saint Cathróe of Metz, written by a cleric (Reimann) who claimed to have been a former pupil of the saint, may possibly shed some light on his background. St Cathróe, a Scottish saint with a Brythonic name, visited a certain King Eric (Erichus) in York as he proceeded southwards from his native Strathclyde and Cumbria to Loida civitas, sometimes identified as Leeds, on the boundary with Cumbria, ultimately intending to go to West France. This Eric was both settled and married, and may have been on good terms with his neighbours in the north-west, although the evidence is indirect and somewhat ambiguous: the saint claimed kinship not only with Eric's wife but also with Dyfnwal (III) (d. 975), king of Strathclyde and Cumbria (Donevaldus, rex Cumbrorum), which may point to an alliance of some kind between the two rulers. Based on internal evidence for the saint's itinerary, Cathróe's stay is to be dated between 940 x 943, when Constantine (II) left the kingdom of Scotland to Malcolm (I), and 946, when Edmund was slain. The greatest obstacle to an identification of the Erics lies in the problem that the account would be difficult to square with the version of events presented by the Anglo-Saxon Chronicle and the assertion in royal charters that in 946, Edmund was still king of all Britain. It may be noted that the text's chronology has likewise presented some difficulties concerning the political status of Dyfnwal in the story (see main article there).

=== King of the Hebrides (Caithréim Chellacháin Chaisil) ===
A further glimpse may be offered by the mid-12th-century Irish saga entitled Caithréim Chellacháin Chaisil, a text which was primarily designed to glorify the deeds of Cellachán mac Buadacháin (d. 954), king of Munster, and hence his descendants, the Clann Faílbe. In one of its poems, an "Eric, King of the Islands" (Éiric Righ na n-Innse), meaning ruler of the Hebrides, is described as having allied himself to Sitriuc mac Tuirgeis, king of Dublin. Although the Caithréim is hardly a work celebrated for its accuracy as a source of history, the distant memory of an Eric who ruled the Hebrides may not be fictitious. It may be a matter of coincidence that the next Vikings known to have ruled the Hebrides were also 'sons of Harold', Gofraid mac Arailt, ri Innsi Gall (d. 989), who was succeeded by his son Ragnall, rí na n-innsi (d. 1005), and probably Gofraid's brother Maccus mac Arailt, who is accorded the title "king of very many islands" (plurimarum rex insularum).

== Death ==
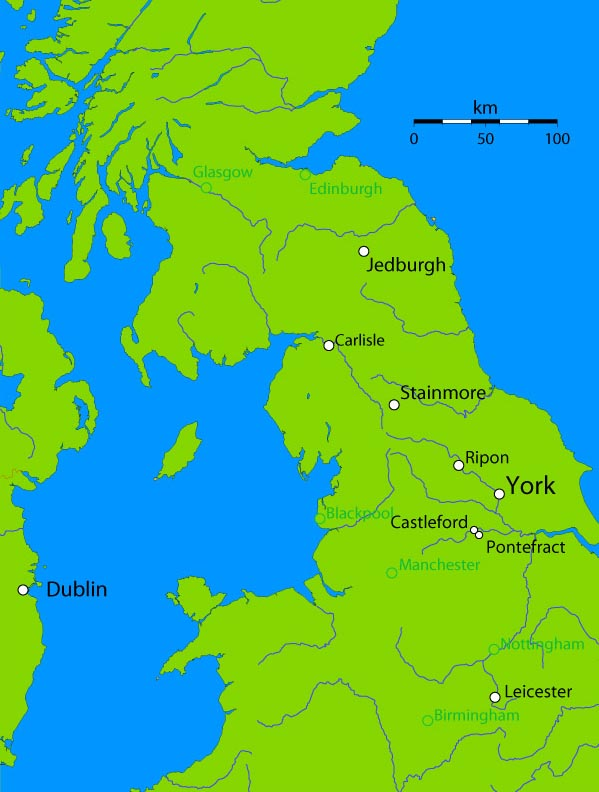
Map with relevant locations.

The Chronicle gives no explanation, but it seems as if the abdications of Amlaíb and Eric are described as essentially northern affairs, apparently without much (direct) West-Saxon intervention, let alone invasion. The historical accounts of Eric's death point to more complex circumstances, but Northumbrian politics are to the fore. Following a report on the invasion of Scotland by William I in 1072, the Historia regum attributed to Symeon of Durham recalls that Eric was driven out and slain by one Maccus son of Onlaf. The Flores historiarum (early 13th century) by Roger of Wendover is thought to have relied on a northern source now lost to us when it adds the following details:

... rex Eilricus in quadam solitudine quae 'Steinmor' dicitur, cum filio suo Henrico [in other MSS, Haerico] et fratre Reginaldo, proditione Osulfi comitis, a Macone consule fraudulenter interempti sunt, ac deinde in partibus illis rex Eadredus regnavit.

Translation:

King Eric was treacherously killed by Earl [consul] Maccus in a certain lonely place which is called Stainmore, with his son Haeric and his brother Ragnald, betrayed by Earl [comes] Oswulf; and then afterwards King Eadred ruled in these districts.

Stainmore, traditionally in Westmorland and administratively in Cumbria, lies in the main pass through the northern Pennines, the Stainmore Pass or Gap, which marks the boundary between Cumbria in the west and modern Durham in the east. It is here that the mountains are traversed by an old Roman road – more or less followed by the A66 today – leading from York to Catterick and north-westwards from Catterick (via Bowes, Stainmore, Brough, Appleby and Penrith) to Carlisle. Eric may therefore have followed by and large the same route that St Cathroé had taken, except in the opposite direction, possibly with Strathclyde or the Hebrides as his intended destination.

The comes Osulf who betrayed Eric was high-reeve of the northern half of Northumbria, centred on Bamburgh, roughly corresponding to the former kingdom of Bernicia. He clearly benefited from his murderous plot against Eric. The Historia regum says that the province of Northumbria was henceforward administered by earls and records the formal appointment of Osulf as earl of Northumbria the following year. Likewise, the early 12th century De primo Saxonum adventu notes that "[f]irst of the earls after Erik, the last king whom the Northumbrians had, Osulf administered under King Eadred all the provinces of the Northumbrians."

By contrast, the identity of Eric's slayer, the comes Maccus son of Anlaf, is unclear. His name may point to origins in a Norse-Gaelic family based in the Border country. While Anlaf (Middle Irish: Amlaíb, Old Norse: Óláfr) is a common Scandinavian and Norse-Gaelic name, Maccus, a Norse-Gaelic name of Middle Irish origin, is geographically more restricted and is particularly well attested in southern Scottish place-names. Based on Eric's confrontation with his predecessor Óláfr in Fagrskinna, attempts have been made to connect Onlaf to Amlaíb Cuarán, but this must remain in the realm of speculation.

Eric's death receives a grander treatment in the synoptic histories and sagas. Fagrskinna, apparently the Eiríksmál which it incorporates, and Heimskringla assert that Eric and five other kings died together in battle in an unnamed place in England. According to Ágrip and Historia Norwegiæ, Eric died on a foray in Spain after being forced out of Northumbria. Somewhat in line with the former version, earlier generations of scholars have envisaged the occasion of Eric's death on Stainmore to have been a last stand in battle. The view was espoused by W.G. Collingwood and later still by Frank Stenton, who speculates that Eric might have attempted to regain the kingdom or was fighting off pursuers. Finnur Jónsson re-interprets the alternative tradition in a historical light by proposing that Span- "Spain" in Ágrip goes back to a scribal confusion for Stan-, which in turn would have referred to Stainmore (OE *Stan). Having thus ascribed a historical core to the body of Scandinavian material, he in turn interprets the event as a battle.

However, scholars today are usually less prepared to colour the sober records with details from the sagas, preferring to take the view that Eric was assassinated in exile. In sum then, it looks as if Eric, expelled and heading in a north-westerly direction (possibly in search of support), was about to cross over into Cumbria, when in a bid for power, his official Osulf had him killed through the agency of Maccus. Exactly what made this a betrayal (proditio) in the eyes of the 10th century chronicler or those of Roger of Wendover, is unclear. It is unknown whether Osulf was also behind Eric's expulsion, despite being the main beneficiary, and whether he was expected to grant Eric safe passage and perhaps an escort to guide him safely through that part of Northumbria over which he (Osulf) had jurisdiction. It is equally obscure whether Maccus ambushed his victims, or was part of the escort, betraying them (fraudulenter) as soon as he saw the opportunity.

=== Eiríksmál ===
Towards the end of its portrait of Eric, Fagrskinna cites the Eiríksmál ("Lay of Eric"), an anonymous panegyric written in commemoration of Eric's death and according to the saga's introduction, commissioned by his widow Gunnhild. Except for a single stanza in the Edda, the skaldic poem is preserved nowhere else and what has survived may represent only the opening stanzas.

Cast as a dialogue between Bragi, Odin, and fallen heroes, it tells of Eric's arrival in Valhöll, accompanied by five other kings, and his splendid welcome there by Odin and his entourage. Odin had eagerly awaited his coming because "many lands [...] / with his sword he has reddened" and on being asked why he had deprived Eric of such earthly glory, answers that "the future is uncertain", since the grey wolf is always lying in wait. Eric is then greeted by the famous hero Sigmundr: "Hail now, Eiríkr [...] / here you shall be welcome; / brave hero, enter the hall."

Some have argued that the language of the poem shows influence from Old English. However, on recently examining the poem, John McKinnell could find little trace of this. The (original) date of composition remains a matter of some debate: some argue that it was written shortly after Eric's death, while others who regard the poem as an imitation of the Hákonarmál in honour of Haakon the Good prefer a date sometime after Haakon's death, c. 961.

In spite of the decidedly pagan contents of the poem, Eric may have died a Christian, as some of the sagas suggest. There is no evidence for his religious beliefs, but if ever Eric was to be accepted and consecrated as king, probably with Wulfstan as king-maker, acceptance of the Christian faith would have been set as a condition to royal office. The impression is borne out by Wulfstan's earlier removal of Amlaíb Cuarán and Ragnald on grounds that they had become, in Æthelweard's words, deserti "deserters" (see above).

In support of this view, it has sometimes been suggested that the name of one Eiric rex Danorum, "Eric king of the Danes", written into the Durham Liber Vitae, f. 55v., may represent Eric of York. However, this can now be safely rejected in favour of an identification with Eric Ejegod (r. 1095–1103), whose queen Bodil (Botild) occurs by name after him.

=== Rey Cross ===
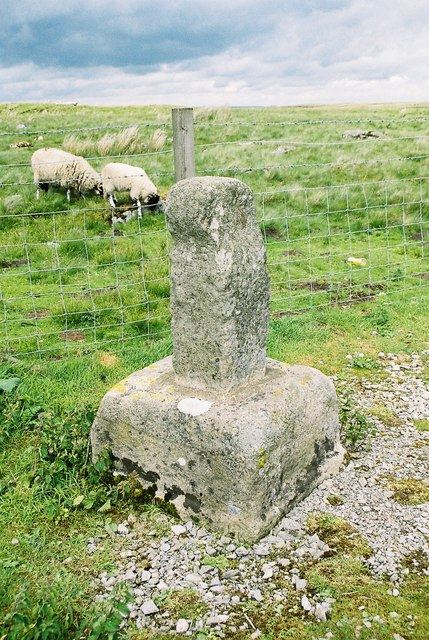
Rey Cross

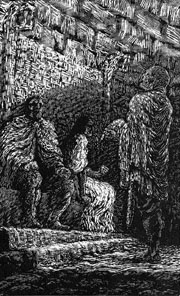
Eric Bloodaxe, seated, and Gunnhild are confronted by Egill Skallagrimsson.

On the north side of the A66 in Stainmore today stands the so-called Rey cross, also known as Rere Cross, though what survives is little more than a stump consisting of the socket and a fragment of the shaft. Before it was temporarily housed at the Bowes Museum in 1990 and moved to its present location, it stood on a mound of rock a little further west on the south side of the road – coordinates: NY 89991230. The two sides of the shaft once seem to have borne carvings, if that much can be concluded from John Speed's supposed description in 1611. Based on stylistic observations made by W. G. Collingwood when certain features were apparently still visible, it has been described as an Anglo-Scandinavian cross, possibly of the 10th century. No burials have been found. All evidence seems to point to its use as a boundary marker (between Cumbria and Northumbria), much like the Legg's cross (County Durham) on Dere Street. The name has been explained as deriving from Old Norse hreyrr, "cairn", or "boundary cairn". Towards the end of the 19th century, however, W. S. Calverley argued that whatever its function in later ages, crosses in those times were usually tombstones, whereas boundary crosses postdate the Conquest. In the absence of a churchyard, he tentatively links the erection of the Rey cross to the putative battle on Stainmore. Although he ultimately rejects the idea of a memorial stone for Eric as "mere romance", W. G. Collingwood was less prepared to dismiss it out of hand: "a romancer might be justified in fancying that the Rey cross was carved and set up by Northumbrian admirers of the once mighty and long famous last King of York." No further evidence has been adduced to support the suggestion.

== Reputation in the sagas ==
The figure that Eric became in the Norse sagas is a heady mix of history, folklore, and political propaganda. He is usually portrayed as a larger-than-life Viking hero, whose powerful and violent performances bring him many short-term successes, but ultimately make him flawed and unpopular as a ruler and statesman. The Heimskringla describes Eric as "a large and handsome man, strong and of great prowess, a great and victorious warrior", but also "violent of disposition, cruel, gruff, and taciturn". The synoptic histories (Theodoricus, the Historia Norwegiae, and Ágrip) to some degree seek to excuse Eric's cruelty and fall from favour with the Norwegian nobility by pointing out another weakness, that of his naive faith in the evil counsels of his wife.

=== Conflict with Egill Skallagrimsson (Egils saga) ===
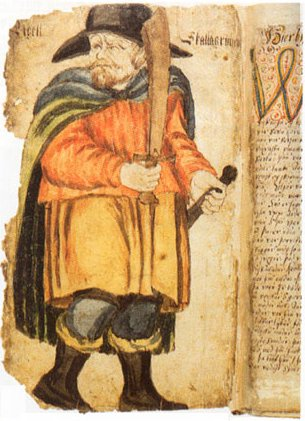
Picture of Egill in a 17th-century manuscript of Egils Saga.

One of the richest sagas to deal with Eric Bloodaxe and his affairs in England is Egils saga, which is also a rich if problematic source for skaldic poems surviving from the 10th century. It tells how at the instigation of his wife Gunnhild, King Eric became involved in a prolonged conflict with Egill Skallagrimsson, the well-known Icelander Viking and skald. The account seems designed to enhance Egill's abilities as a warrior, wizard, and poet. The story can be summarised as follows.

Egill had killed Bárðr of Atley, one of the king's retainers, thus making an enemy of Queen Gunnhild, who never forgave him and did everything within her power to take revenge. Gunnhild ordered her two brothers to kill Egil and Egill's older brother Þórólfr, who had been on good terms with both her and the king before. However, this plan did not go well, as Egill easily killed the pair when they confronted him, greatly increasing the Queen's thirst for revenge. All that happened shortly before the death of Harald Fairhair and King Eric's killing of his brothers to secure his place on the throne. He then declared Egill an outlaw in Norway. Berg-Önundr gathered a company of men to capture Egill but was killed in his attempt to do so. Escaping from Norway, Egill killed Ragnald (Rögnvaldr Eirikssen), the king's son, and then cursed his parents, setting a horse's head on a pole (níðstöng or "spite-post") and saying,

"Here I set up a pole of insult against King Eirik and Queen Gunnhild" – then, turning the horse head towards the mainland – "and I direct this insult against the guardian spirits of this land, so that every one of them shall go astray, neither to figure nor find their dwelling places until they have King Eirik and Queen Gunnhild from this country."

He set up the pole of spite in the cliff-face and left it standing; he faced the horse's eyes on the land, and he rist runes upon the pole, and said all the formal words of the curse. (níð has been variously translated as "scorn", "spite" or "curse"). Gunnhild also put a spell on Egill, which made him feel restless and depressed until they met again. The last encounter happened when Erik and Gunnhild were living in England. Egill was shipwrecked on a nearby shore and came before Eric, who sentenced him to death. But Egill composed a drápa in Eric's praise in the dungeon during the night, and when he recited it in the morning, Eric gave him his freedom and forgave any vengeance or settlement for the killing of Ragnald.

== Sources ==
=== Primary sources ===
- Anderson, Alan Orr, Early Sources of Scottish History A.D. 500–1286, volume 1. Reprinted with corrections. Paul Watkins, Stamford, 1990.
- Anglo-Saxon Chronicle MSS D ('Worcester Chronicle', London, British Library, Cotton Tiberius B.IV) and E (‘Peterborough Chronicle’ or ‘Laud Chronicle’, Oxford, Bodleian Library, MS Laud 636), ed. D. Dumville and S. Keynes, The Anglo-Saxon Chronicle. A Collaborative Edition. Vols 6 and 7. Cambridge, 1983; tr. Michael J. Swanton, The Anglo-Saxon Chronicles. 2nd ed. London, 2000.
- Æthelweard, Chronicon, ed. and tr. Alistair Campbell, The Chronicle of Æthelweard. London, 1961.
- Reimann or Ousmann, De S. Cadroe abbate (The Life of St Cathróe), ed. John Colgan, Acta Sanctorum Hiberniae, Vol. 1. pp. 494 ff; in part reprinted by W.F. Skene, Chronicles of the Picts, Chronicles of the Scots. pp. 106–116; ed. the Bollandists, Acta Sanctorum. 1865. 1 March 473–80 (incomplete); ed. and tr. A.O. Anderson, Early Sources of Scottish History, A.D. 500 to 1286. (from Colgan's edition, pp. 495–7). No full translation has appeared to this date.
- Chronicle of the Kings of Alba, ed. W.F. Skene. Chronicles of the Picts and Scots: And Other Memorials of Scottish History. Edinburgh, 1867. 8–10.
- Post-Conquest English histories:
  - William of Malmesbury, Gesta regum Anglorum, ed. and tr. R.A.B. Mynors, R. M. Thomson and M. Winterbottom, William of Malmesbury. Gesta Regum Anglorum. The History of the English Kings. OMT. 2 vols: vol 1. Oxford, 1998.
  - John of Worcester, Chronicle (of Chronicles), ed. Benjamin Thorpe, Florentii Wigorniensis monachi chronicon ex chronicis. 2 vols. London, 1848–9; tr. J. Stevenson, Church Historians of England. 8 vols: vol. 2.1. London, 1855. 171–372.
  - Henry of Huntingdon, Historia Anglorum, ed. and tr. D.E. Greenway, Henry Archdeacon of Huntingdon. Historia Anglorum. The History of the English People. OMT. Oxford, 1996.
  - Historia Regum (Anglorum et Dacorum), ed. Thomas Arnold, Symeonis Monachi Opera Omnia. 2 vols: vol 2. London, 1885. 1–283; tr. J. Stevenson, Church Historians of England. 8 vols: vol. 4 (part 2: The Historical Works of Simeon of Durham). London, 1853. 425–617.
  - De primo Saxonum adventu, ed. Thomas Arnold, Symeonis Monachi Opera Omnia. 2 vols: vol 2. London, 1885. 365–84 (Appendix 1); tr. Alan Orr Anderson, Scottish Annals from English Chroniclers A.D. 500 to 1286. Revised and corrected ed. Stamford: Paul Watkins, 1991 (1908).
  - Roger of Wendover, Flores Historiarum, ed. H. O. Coxe, Rogeri de Wendoveri chronica, sive, Flores historiarum. Vol 1. London, 1841. 402–3.
  - Roger of Howden, Chronica Rogeri de Houedene, ed. William Stubbs. Chronica magistri de Houedene. 4 vols.: vol. 1. Rolls series 51. London, 1868.
- Corpus of Early Medieval Coin Finds (EMC), at the Department of Coins and Medals, Fitzwilliam Museum.
- Anglo-Saxon charters, here indicated as S + number and date following Peter Sawyer, Anglo-Saxon Charters. An Annotated List and Bibliography. London, 1968, and The Electronic Sawyer Archived 23 February 2011 at the Wayback Machine.
- Contemporary skaldic poetry:
  - Eiríksmál, ed. R.D. Fulk, Skaldic Poetry of the Scandinavian Middle Ages; tr. Alison Finlay, Fagrskinna: A Catalogue of the Kings of Norway. Leiden: Brill Academic Publishers, 2004. pp. 58–9.
  - Egill Skallagrímsson, Lausavísur, ed. Margaret Clunies Ross. At Skaldic Poetry of the Scandinavian Middle Ages.
  - –––, Arinbjarnarkviða, ed. Margaret Clunies Ross. At Skaldic Poetry of the Scandinavian Middle Ages.
  - –––, Höfuðlausn, ed. Margaret Clunies Ross. At Skaldic Poetry of the Scandinavian Middle Ages.
  - Eyvindr Finnsson skáldaspillir, Lausavísur, ed. Russel Poole. At Skaldic Poetry of the Scandinavian Middle Ages.
- Synoptics:
  - Historia Norwegiæ, ed. Inger Ekrem and Lars Boje Mortensen, tr. Peter Fisher, Historia Norwegie. Museum Tusculanum Press, 2003; tr. Debra Kunin, A History of Norway and the Passion and Miracles of the Blessed Óláfr. London: Viking Society for Northern Research, University College London, 2001. Online PDF, including corrections, available from Viking Society for Northern Research Archived 1 April 2022 at the Wayback Machine.
  - Ágrip af Nóregskonungasögum, ed. and tr. M.J. Driscoll, Ágrip af Nóregskonungasǫgum. Viking Society for Northern Research Text Series 10. 2nd ed. 2008 (1995).
  - Theodoricus monachus, Historia de Antiquitate Regum Norwagiensium, ed. Gustav Storm, Monumenta Historica Norvegiæ: Latinske kildeskrifter til Norges historie i middelalderen. Kristiania, 1880; tr. David and Ian McDougall, Theodoricus Monachus. Historia de Antiquitate regum Norwagiensium. Viking Society for Northern Research. 1998.
- Nóregs konungatal (c. 1190, preserved in Flateyjarbók), ed. Kari Ellen Gade, Skaldic Poetry of the Scandinavian Middle Ages.
- Icelandic kings' sagas. Chapter numbering follows that assigned in the translations given below:
  - Fagrskinna, ed. Finnur Jónsson, Fagrskinna. Nóregs Kononga Tal. Copenhagen, 1902–3. PDF available from septentrionalia.net Archived 20 May 2008 at the Wayback Machine; tr. Alison Finlay, Fagrskinna: A Catalogue of the Kings of Norway. Leiden: Brill Academic Publishers, 2004. The chapter numbering follows that of Bjarni Einarsson (the most recent editor) and Alison Finlay.
  - Egils saga, ed. Finnur Jónsson, Egils saga Skallagrímssonar. Halle, 1894; tr. Herman Pálsson and Paul Edwards, Egil's Saga. Harmondsworth, 1976.
  - Snorri Sturluson, Heimskringla, ed. Finnur Jónsson, Snorri Sturluson. Heimskringla. Nóregs konunga sögur. Copenhagen, 1911; tr. Lee M. Hollander, Snorri Sturluson. Heimskringla: History of the Kings of Norway. University of Texas Press, 1964.
  - Orkneyinga saga (ch. 8–9 and 17), ed. Finnbogi Guðmundsson, Orkneyinga saga. Íslenzk fornrit 34. Reykjavík: Hið íslenzka fornritafélag, 1965; tr. Hermann Pálsson and Paul Edwards, Orkneyinga Saga: The History of the Earls of Orkney. London: Hogarth Press, 1978. Republished 1981, Harmondsworth: Penguin.
  - Óláfs saga Tryggvasonar en mesta (Longer saga of Óláf Tryggvason), ed. Ólafur Halldórsson, Óláfs saga Tryggvasonar en mesta. Copenhagen, 1958; ed. Hèr hefr upp Sögu Ólafs konúngs Tryggvasonar. available from Saganet; tr. John Sephton, The Saga of Olaf Tryggwason. London, 1895 (based on edition in Fornmanna sögur).
- Irish annals:
  - Annals of the Four Masters, ed. and tr. John O’Donovan, Annála Rioghachta Éireann. Annals of the Kingdom of Ireland by the Four Masters. 7 vols.: vol. 2. Royal Irish Academy. Dublin, 1848–51.
  - Annals of Clonmacnoise, Denis Murphy, The Annals of Clonmacnoise. Royal Society of Antiquaries of Ireland. Dublin, 1896.
  - Chronicon Scotorum, ed. and tr. Gearóid Mac Niocaill. Chronicon Scotorum. Edition Archived 1 April 2009 at the Wayback Machine and translation Archived 25 April 2009 at the Wayback Machine available from CELT, supplied with readings from older edition of W. M. Hennessy (ed. and tr.), Chronicum Scotorum. London, 1866.
  - Annals of Ulster, ed. and tr. Seán Mac Airt and Gearóid Mac Niocaill, The Annals of Ulster (to AD 1131). Dublin, 1983.
- Caithréim Chellacháin Chaisil, ed. Alexander Bugge, Caithream Ceallachain Caisil. The Victorious Career of Cellachan of Cashel. Christiania, 1905.
- Durham Liber Vitae, ed. A.H. Thompson, Liber vitae ecclesiae Dunelmensis. Surtees Society 136. 1923.

=== Secondary sources ===
- Calverley, W.S. "Stainmoor." Notes on the early sculptured crosses, shrines and monuments in the present diocese of Carlisle, ed. W.G. Collingwood. Cumberland and Westmorland Antiquarian and Archaeological Society 11. Kendal, 1899. 264–8.
- Campbell, Alistair. "Two Notes on the Norse Kingdoms in Northumbria." English Historical Review 57 (1942): 85–97: 91–7 ("The End of the Kingdom of Northumbria.").
- Collingwood, W.G. "King Eirík of York." Saga-book of Viking Club Society for Northern Research 2 (1897–1900): 313–27.
- Collingwood, W.G. "The battle of Stainmoor in legend and history." Transactions of the Cumberland and Westmorland Antiquarian Archaeological Society series 2 no. 2 (1902): 231–41. doi:10.5284/1064871
- Cormack, Margaret. "Egils saga, Heimskringla, and the Daughter of Eiríkr blóðøx." alvissmál 10 (2001): 61–8. Available online
- Costambeys, Marios. "Erik Bloodaxe (d. 954)." Oxford Dictionary of National Biography. September 2004. Accessed: 2 February 2009.
- Downham, Clare (2003). "The Chronology of the Last Scandinavian Kings of York, AD 937–954". Northern History. 40: 25–51. doi:10.1179/007817203792207979. S2CID 161092701.
- Downham, Clare (2004). "Eric Bloodaxe – axed? The Mystery of the Last Viking King of York". Mediaeval Scandinavia. 14: 51–77.
- Downham, Clare. Viking Kings of Britain and Ireland. The Dynasty of Ívarr to A.D. 1014. Edinburgh, 2007.
- Hudson, Benjamin T. Viking Pirates and Christian Princes: Dynasty, Religion, and Empire in the North Atlantic. Oxford: Oxford University Press, 2005 ISBN 0-19-516237-4.
- Jakobsson, Sverrir. "„Erindringen om en mægtig Personlighed“: Den norsk-islandske historiske tradisjon om Harald Hårfagre i et kildekritisk perspektiv.“ "Historisk tidsskrift" 81 (2002): 213–30.
- Lang, James (ed.). Corpus of Anglo-Saxon Stone Sculpture. Volume VI: Yorkshire North Riding (Except Ryedale). British Academy 6. Oxford, 2002.
- McKinnell, John. "Eddic Poetry in Anglo-Scandinavian Northern England." In Vikings and the Danelaw. Select Papers from the Proceedings of the Thirteenth Viking Congress, ed. James Graham-Campbell et al. Oxford, 2001. 327–44.
- Sawyer, Peter (1995). "The last Scandinavian rulers of York". Northern History. 31: 39–44. doi:10.1179/007817295790175462.
- Smyth, Alfred P. Warlords and Holy Men: Scotland AD 80–1000. Edinburgh: Edinburgh UP, 1984.
- Stenton, F.M. Anglo-Saxon England. 3rd ed. Oxford, 1971.
- Williams, Ann. "Eadred (d. 955)." Oxford Dictionary of National Biography. September 2004. Accessed: 2 February 2009.
- Woolf, Alex (1998). "Eric Bloodaxe revisited". Northern History. 34: 189–93. doi:10.1179/007817298790178303.

=== Further reading ===
- Bailey, R.N. "The Rey cross: background." In Stainmore. The Archaeology of a North Pennine Pass, ed. B. Vyner. Tees Archaeology Monographs 1. Hartlepool, 2001. 118–20.
- Cormack, Margaret, "Fact and Fiction in the Icelandic Sagas," History Compass 4 (2006).
- Dumville, D.N. "St Cathróe of Metz and the hagiography of exoticism." In Studies in Irish Hagiography. Saints and scholars, ed. John Carey, Máire Herbert and Pádraig Ó Riain. Dublin, 2001. 172–88.
- Etchingham, Colman (2001). "North Wales, Ireland and the Isles: the Insular Viking zone". Peritia. 15: 145–87. doi:10.1484/j.peri.3.434.
- Larrington, Carolyne. "Egill’s longer poems: Arinbjarnarkviða and Sonatorrek." In Introductory Essays on Egils saga and Njáls saga, ed. J. Hines and D. Slay, London: The Viking Society for Northern Research, 1992
- Williams, Gareth. Eirik Bloodaxe. Saga Book, 2010
- Woolf, Alex. From Pictland to Alba, 789–1070. The New Edinburgh History of Scotland. Edinburgh: Edinburgh University Press, 2007. ISBN 978-0-7486-1234-5, OCLC 123113911

Eric Bloodaxe Fairhair dynasty Born: c. 895 Died: 954
Regnal titles
Preceded by Harald I	King of Norway c. 929–934	Succeeded by Haakon I
Preceded by Edmund of Wessex; As King of England	King of Northumbria c. 947–948	Succeeded by Amlaíb Cuarán
Preceded by Amlaíb Cuarán	King of Northumbria; 952–954	Succeeded by Eadred of Wessex; As King of England
