= Egill Skallagrímsson =

Viking Age Icelandic poet, warrior and farmer

Egil Skallagrímsson
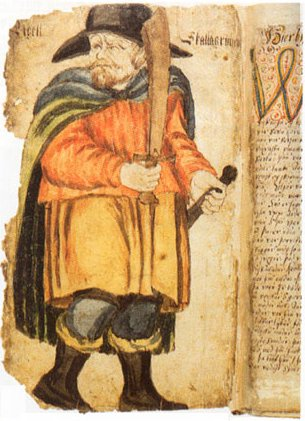
- Picture of Egil in a 17th-century manuscript of Egils Saga
- Born: 904; Iceland
- Died: 995 (aged 90–91); Mosfellsbær, Iceland
- Occupations: Skald, berserker and farmer
- Spouse: Ásgerðr Björnsdóttir
- Children: Þorgerðr Egilsdóttir, Bera Egilsdóttir, Böðvarr Egilsson, Gunnar Egilsson and Þorsteinn Egilsson
- Parent(s): Skalla-Grímr and Bera Yngvarsdóttir
- Writing career
- Language: Old Norse
- Period: Viking Age
- Notable works: Höfuðlausn, Sonatorrek
- Movement: Skaldic poetry

Egil Skallagrímsson (Old Norse: Egill Skallagrímsson [ˈeɣelː ˈskɑlːɑˌɡriːmsˌson]; Modern Icelandic: [ˈeijɪtl̥ ˈskatlaˌkrimsˌsɔːn]; c. 904 – c. 995) was a Viking Age war poet, sorcerer, berserker, and farmer. He is known mainly as the anti-hero of Egil's Saga. Egil's Saga historically narrates a period from approximately 850 to 1000 AD and is believed to have been written between 1220 and 1240 AD.

== Life ==
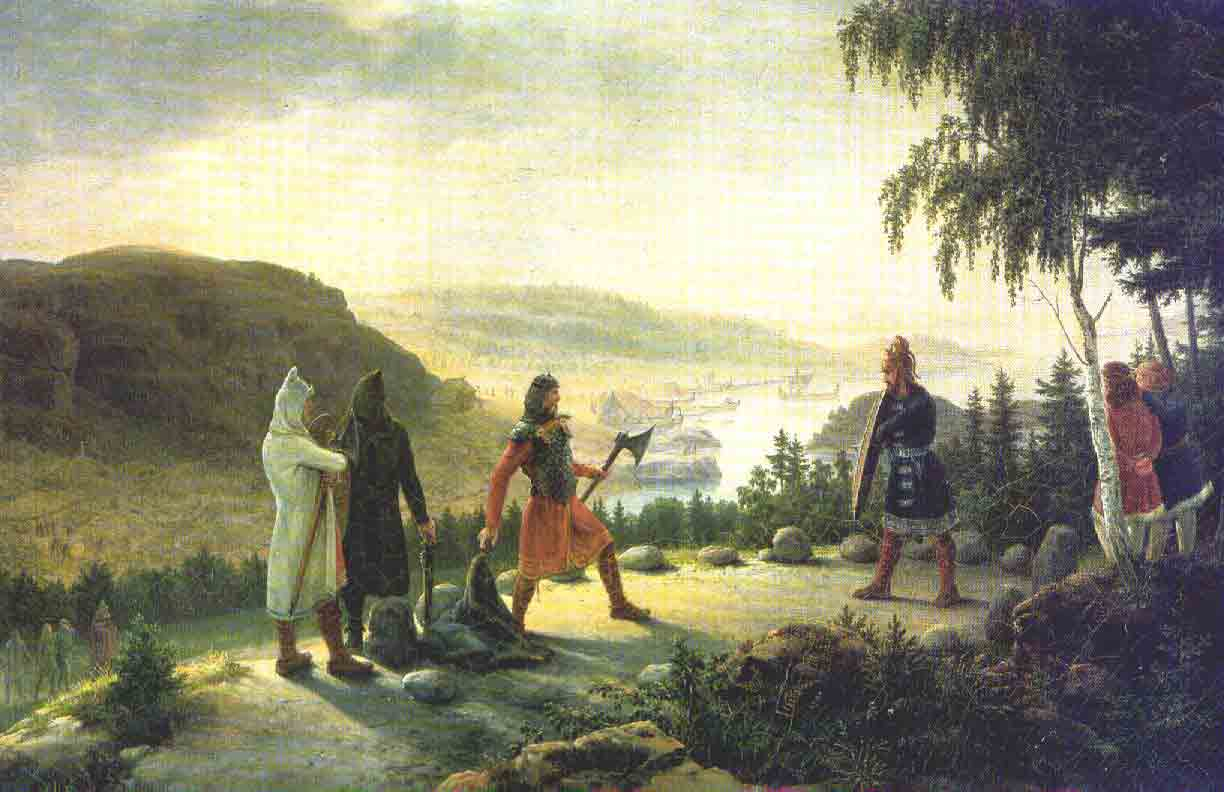
Egil engaging in holmgang with Berg-Önundr; painting by Johannes Flintoe

Egil was born in Iceland, to Skalla-Grímr Kveldúlfsson and Bera Yngvarsdóttir; he was the grandson of Kveld-Úlfr (whose name means 'evening wolf'). Another of his ancestors, Hallbjörn, was Norwegian-Sami.

Skalla-Grímr was a respected chieftain, and mortal enemy of King Harald Fairhair of Norway. He migrated to Iceland, settling at Borg where his father Kveld-Úlfr's coffin landed after being ritualistically set adrift as Skalla-Grímr's boat approached Iceland. Skalla-Grímr and wife Bera had two daughters, Sæunn and Þórunn, and two sons, Þorolfr and Egil.

Egil composed his first poem at three years old. He exhibited berserk behaviour, and this, together with the description of his large and unattractive head, has led to the theory that he might have suffered from Paget's disease, which causes a thickening of the bones and may lead eventually to blindness.

At the age of seven, Egil was cheated in a game with local boys. Enraged, he went home, procured an axe, and, returning to the boys, split the skull to the teeth of the boy who had cheated him. After Berg-Önundr refused to allow Egil to claim his wife Ásgerðr's share of her father's inheritance, he challenged Önundr to a man-to-man fight on an island (a hólmganga). Berg-Önundr refused the challenge but was later killed along with his brother Hadd by Egil. Egil later killed the last of the brothers, Atli the Short, by biting through Atli's neck during a holmgangr.

Later, after being grievously insulted, Egil killed Bárðr of Atley, a retainer of King Eiríkr Bloodaxe and kinsman of Queen Gunnhildr, both of whom spent the remainder of their lives trying to take vengeance. Gunnhildr ordered her two brothers, Eyvindr Braggart and Álfr Aksmann, to assassinate Egil and his brother Þórólfr, who had been on good terms with her previously. However, Egil killed the Queen's brothers when they attempted to confront him.

In spring Þórólfr and Egil prepared a large warship and raid along the Eastern route (Austrvegr), where they won much wealth and had many battles. In Courland they made a peace for half a month and traded with the men of the land (ch. 46).

That same summer, Haraldr Fairhair died. In order to secure his place as sole King of Norway, Eiríkr Bloodaxe murdered his two brothers. He then declared Egil an outlaw in Norway. Berg-Önundr gathered a company of men to capture Egil, but was killed in the attempt. Before escaping from Norway, Egil also killed Rögnvaldr, the son of King Eiríkr and Queen Gunnhildr. He then cursed the King and Queen, setting a horse's head on a Nithing pole and saying

"Here I set up a níð-pole, and declare this níð against King Eiríkr and Queen Gunnhildr,"—he turned the horse-head to face the mainland—"I declare this níð at the land-spirits there, and the land itself, so that all will fare astray, not to hold nor find their places, not until they wreak King Eiríkr and Gunnhildr from the land." He set up the pole of níð in the cliff-face and left it standing; he faced the horse's eyes on the land, and he carved runes upon the pole, and said all the formal words of the curse. (ch. 57).

Gunnhildr also put a spell on Egil, cursing him to feel restless and depressed until they met again.

Soon afterwards, Eiríkr and Gunnhildr were forced to flee to the Kingdom of Northumbria by Prince Hákon. In Saxon England, they became King and Queen of Northumbria in rivalry with King Athelstan of England. In time, Egil was shipwrecked in Northumbria and learned who ruled the land. Egil sought out the house of his good friend Arinbjörn, where they armed themselves and marched to Eiríkr's court. Arinbjörn told Egil "now you must go and offer the king your head and embrace his foot. I will present your case to him." Arinbjörn presented Egil's case and Egil composes a short drápa, reciting it with Eiríkr's foot in his hand, but Eiríkr was not impressed. He explained that Egil's wrongs to him were far too great to be forgiven so easily. Gunnhildr called for the immediate execution of Egil, but Arinbjörn convinced the king not to kill him until the morning.

Arinbjörn told Egil that he should stay up all night and compose a mighty head-ransom poem or drápa fit for such a king, a poem in praise of his enemy. In the morning Egil went back before king Eiríkr and recited the great drápa. This twenty-stanza long head-ransom poem appears in Chapter 63 of Egils saga. Eiríkr was so surprised by the quality of the poem that he decided to give Egil his life, even though Egil has killed Eiríkr's own son. The complex nature of these poems, with complex poetic metres and metaphors (including kennings), as well as the fact that they were often about kings reliably attested in the historical record, provides some basis for supposing that they might have been composed by a historically real Egil Skallagrímsson, descending more or less unchanged through oral tradition from the time of their composition to the writing of Egils saga. Egils saga and some other Icelandic sagas appear to hang on a skeletal framework of such complex poetry, a spine of historical truth.

Egil also fought at the Battle of Brunanburh in the service of King Æthelstan; his brother Þórólfr died there, for which Egil received two chests of silver from Æthelstan in compensation.

Ultimately, Egil returned to his family farm in Iceland, where he remained a force to be reckoned with in local politics. He lived into his eighties, grew blind, and died shortly before the Christianisation of Iceland. Before Egil died he buried his silver near Mosfellsbær. In his last act of violence he killed the servants who helped him bury his treasure.

When a Christian chapel was constructed at the family homestead, Egil's body was exhumed by his son and re-buried near the altar. According to the saga, the exhumed skull bone was hit with an axe, and it turned white, showing the strength of the warrior, but also, according to one modern interpretation, suggesting the traits of Paget's disease. It has been theorized that Egill suffered from bipolar disorder.

== Physical appearance ==
In chapter 55 of Egil's Saga, his appearance is described as follows

Egil was large-featured, broad of forehead, with large eyebrows, a nose not long but very thick, lips wide and long, chin exceeding broad, as was all about the jaws; thick-necked was he, and big-shouldered beyond other men, hard-featured, and grim when angry. He was well-made, taller than the other men, had hair wolf-gray and thick, but became early bald. He was black-eyed and brown-skinned.

== Issue ==
According to Egils saga, Egil has five children with Ásgerðr Björnsdóttir: Þorgerðr Egilsdóttir, Bera Egilsdóttir, Böðvar Egilsson, Gunnar Egilsson and Þorsteinn Egilsson. In later years, Iceland's Mýrar clan claimed descent from him.

== Poems ==
Apart from being a warrior of immense might in literary sources, Egil is also celebrated for his poetry, considered by many historians to be the finest of the ancient Scandinavian poets and Sonatorrek, the dirge over his own sons, has been called "the birth of Nordic personal lyric poetry". His poems were also the first Old Norse verses to use end rhyme. The following works are attributed to Egil:

1. Aðalsteinsdrápa. Drápa for the Anglo-Saxon King Æthelstan.
2. Höfuðlausn ("The Head Ransom", sometimes referred to as "Head-Ransom"), with which Egil bought his life from Eiríkr Bloodaxe, who had sentenced him to death in England.
3. Sonatorrek ("The Loss of a Son"). After the death of his son Böðvar who drowned during a storm.
4. Arinbjarnarkviða. Dedicated to his companion Arinbjörn
5. Skjaldardrápa.
6. Berudrápa.
7. Lausavísur.
8. Fragments

The following is one of Egil's Lausavísur (no. 3), found in chapter 40 of Egils Saga:

Edition Þat mælti mín móðir, at mér skyldi kaupa fley ok fagrar árar, fara á brott með víkingum, standa upp í stafni, stýra dýrum knerri, halda svá til hafnar höggva mann ok annan.	Translation by Herman Pálsson and Paul Edwards "My mother wants a price paid To purchase my proud-oared ship Standing high in the stern I'll scour for plunder. The stout Viking steersman Of this shining vessel: Then home to harbour After hewing down a man or two."	More literal translation (Wikipedia) "Thus my mother said For me they would buy A sailboat and fair oars Go on away with vikings; Stand up in the stem, Steer a costly ship, Hold course for a haven, Hew down a man and another."	Translation used in Vikings (2013 TV series) "My Mother told me Some day I will buy A galley with good oars And sail to distant shores. Stand up on the prow, Noble barque I steer, A steady course to the haven, Hew many foemen."

== Runes ==
Egil was also a scholar of runes. His apparent mastery of their magic powers assisted him several times during his journeys. During a feast at Atla-isle, Bard's attempt to poison Egil failed when runes carved by Egil shattered his poisoned cup.

At a companion's request, he examined a sick woman. A local land owner, after being denied her hand in marriage, had attempted to carve love-runes. Instead, he had mistakenly carved runes causing illness. Egil burned the offending runes and carved runes for health, and the woman recovered. He then sang a poem declaring that "Runes none should grave ever/Who knows not to read them."

As for the sick young woman, in addition to burning the runes, Egil ordered her to be lifted out of bed and her old bedding to be thrown away and replaced with new sheets. Recovery was swift.

Runes were also employed by Egil during the raising of the Nithing Pole against King Eirik Bloodaxe and Queen Gunnhildr.

== Egil in popular culture ==
- The Icelandic brewery Ölgerðin Egil Skallagrímsson is named after him.
- There is a talk show on Icelandic television called Egil's Silver, named after Egil's hidden treasure (the title is also a play on words with the host's name being Egil.)
- "Egil's Silver" is also the name of a song by Megas, from his first album.
- In the Society for Creative Anachronism Barony of Adiantum there is an "Egil Skallagrimsson Memorial Tournament" held annually on memorial day weekend.
- The novelist Poul Anderson (a member of the SCA) wrote Mother of Kings, a historical fantasy centered on Gunnhildr and the long feud that she, Eirikr, and their children had with Egil. The novel is based on Heimskringla and Egils Saga.
- "Egil Saga" is a song on the album Licht by the German band, Faun. The lyrics are taken from "Egils Saga" and tell the story of the girl made sick by the runes and how Egil cured her.
- Egil Skallagrímsson is a character in the historical fiction series Saxon Stories by Bernard Cornwell, who settles in Northumbria for a time as a close friend and ally to a fictionalized Uhtred of Bebbanburg. Similar to his historical counterpart, he fights at the Battle of Brunanburh, alongside his brother Thorolfr and Lord Uhtred.
- Egil Skallagrimsson alongside his brother Thorolf are characters in the historical fictional series The Whale Road by Tim Hodkinson, They join King Athelstan's army with their mercenaries and fighting side by side with the protagonist of the series Einar Thorfinnson, Egil plays a big role being Einar's companion during the Battle of Brunanburh.
- Egil Son of Skallagrim is the focus of one of the many stories told by the character Bragi in the video game Assassin's Creed Valhalla. In the story, Bragi joined the "sword dancer" Egil to a raid in Courland, quietly stealing livestock and silver from a farm, but returning soon after to burn it to the ground as Egil took credit for the raid.
- In the 2020 video game Crusader Kings III, Egil can sometimes show up and become your vassal in the Icelandic region.
