= Thorgerd Brak =

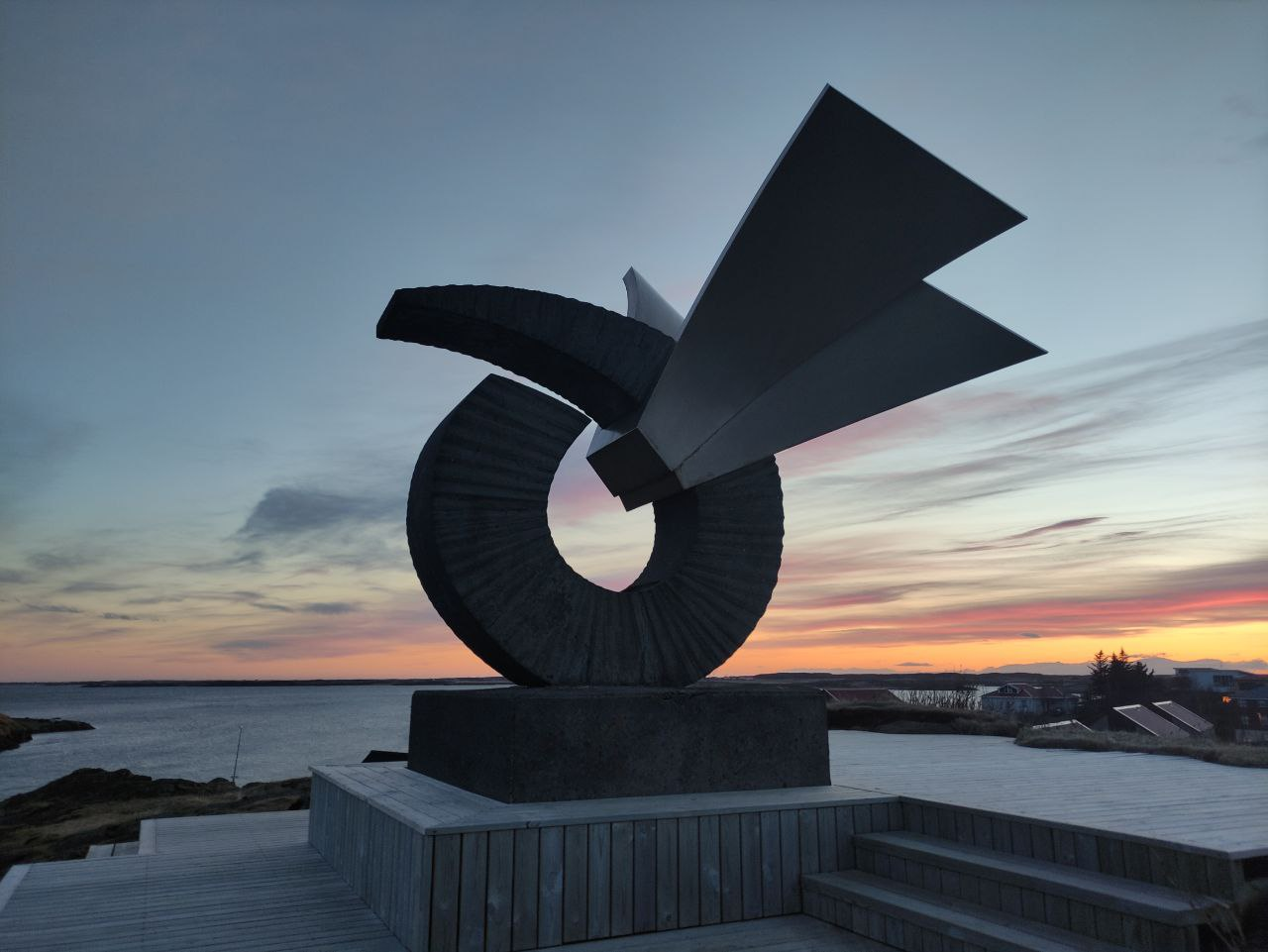
Sculpture commemorating Þorgerðr brák at Borgarnes, Iceland

Þorgerðr brák (anglicised as Thorgerd Brak) is a character in Egils saga. Skilled in magic, she is the foster-mother of the tenth-century poet and saga hero Egill Skallagrímsson, and she sacrifices her life to save him by intervening when his father, Skalla-Grímr, is about to kill him.

== Egils saga ==
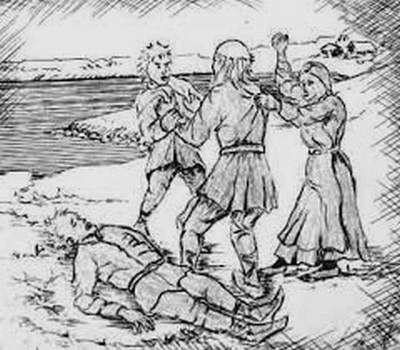
1933 illustration of Þorgerðr (right) drawing Skall-Grímr's attention away from Egill

Þorgerðr is a servant or slave of tenth-century Icelandic warrior and farmer Skalla-Grímr. She foster his young son Egill. The saga narrator describes her as 'an imposing woman, as strong as a man and well-versed in the magic arts.' Her nickname might come from Old Norse brák, a leatherworking tool. The nickname has also been thought to be Gaelic.

When Egill is twelve, Skalla-Grímr grows enraged while playing a ball game with Egill and his teammate Þorðr. Skalla-Grímr kills Þorðr and then seizes Egill. Þorgerðr accuses him of behaving like a shapeshifter (Skalla-Grímr and his father Kveld-Ulfr are rumoured to be able to take on the shape of wolves). When Skalla-Grímr leaves Egill to pursue her, she tries to escape by swimming, but Skalla-Grímr throws a boulder at her, killing her. Egill retaliates by killing Skalla-Grímr's farmhand.

Her namesake, Egill’s daughter Þorgerðr, also saves his life later in the saga when he is pining after the death of his sons.

== Legacy ==
Þorgerðr brák gave her name to Brákarsund and Brákarey in Iceland, which supposedly mark the spot where she died. In 1997 a sculpture by Bjarni Þór Bjarnason depicting a brák (leatherworking tool) was installed at Borgarnes to commemorate her.

In 2008, Icelandic playwright Brynhildur Guðjonsdóttir produced a play, Brák, about Þorgerðr brák.
