= Eyvind Lambi =

Viking military commander

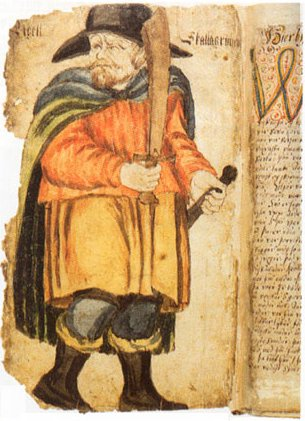
17th-century manuscript of Egil's Saga

Eyvind Lambi or Eyvind Lamb was a Norwegian Viking and hersir of the late ninth and early tenth centuries, known from, among other sources, Egils saga. Eyvind was the son of the Viking Berle-Kari and brother-in-law of Kveldulf Bjalfason, who married Eyvind's sister Salbjorg Karadottir; he was thus uncle to Skalla-Grímr and Thorolf Kveldulfsson and great uncle to the famous poet Egill Skallagrímsson. Eyvind also had a brother named Olvir Hnufa, who became a famous skald at the court of King Harald I of Norway.

== Viking career ==
Like his brother Olvir, Eyvind joined his nephew Thorolf Kveldulfsson on a number of Viking expeditions after the latter received a longship as a gift from his father Kveldulf. They gained a great deal of profit from such voyages. At a thing in Gaular, Olvir fell in love with Solveig Atladottir, the daughter of a jarl in Fjordane named Atli the Slender. The jarl refused Olvir permission to marry the girl, but he was so smitten that he abandoned his Viking life to be near her. Eyvind continued to voyage with Thorolf for some time thereafter.

== Harald's retainer ==
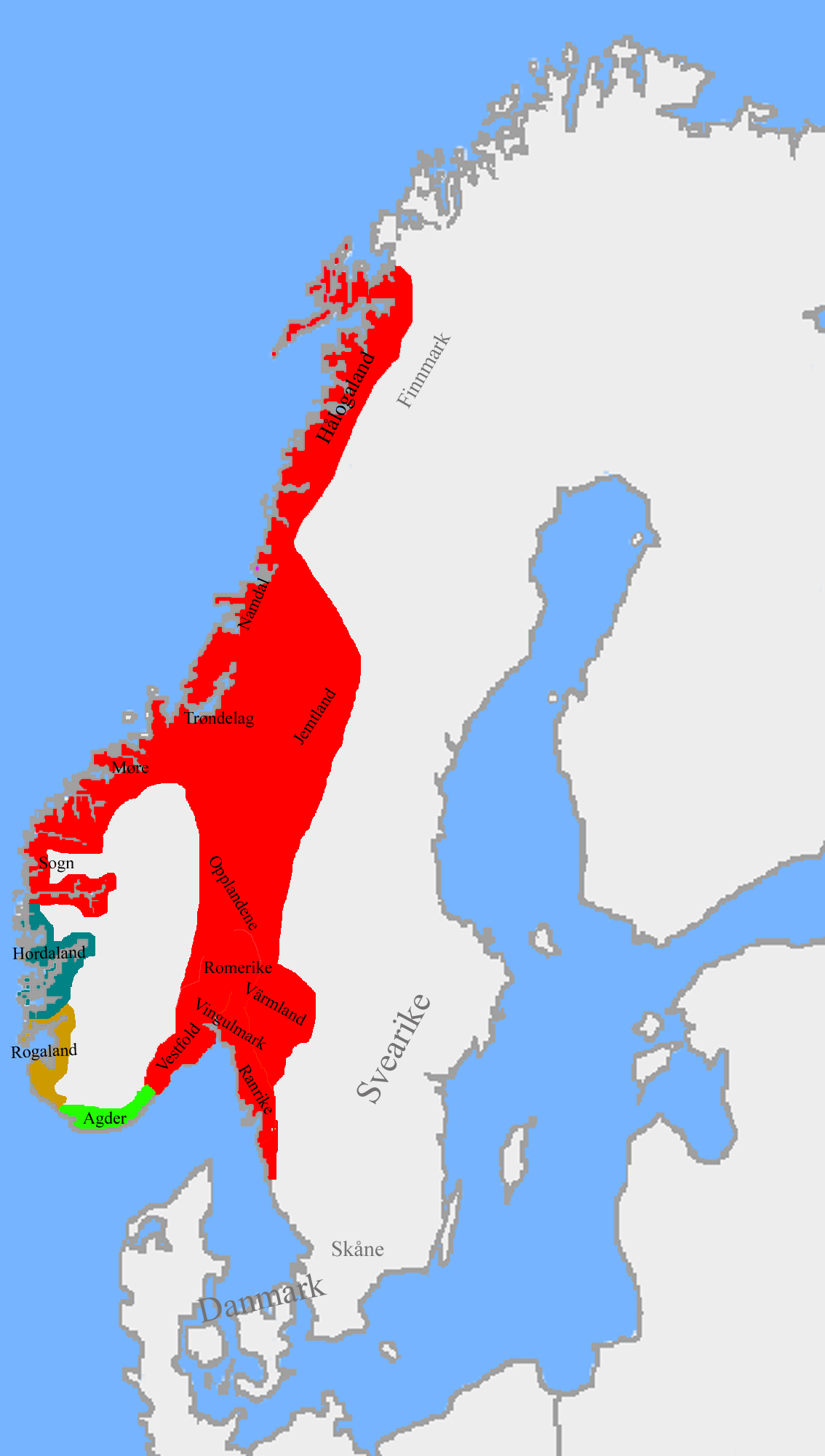
Norway ca. 872 CE (with Harald's kingdom shown in red) before the defining Battle of Hafrsfjord.

Together with Thorolf, Eyvind made his way to the court of King Harald of Vestfold, who was in the process of conquering the Norwegian kingdoms and uniting Norway under his rule. His brother Olvir had already joined the court as a skald. However, after swearing allegiance to King Harald, Eyvind returned home with his father Kari. With Olvir and Thorolf, Eyvind fought at the Battle of Hafrsfjord (c. 872/885) aboard Harald's flagship. Eyvind is thereafter not mentioned until the death of Thorolf at the hands of King Harald (c. 900), at which time he administered to those wounded in the battle. Eyvind assisted Thorolf's widow Sigrid in administering her estates. He subsequently married Sigrid on King Harald's orders. Egil's Saga relates that Eyvind and Harald "remained friends for the rest of their lives."

== Family ==
With Sigrid Eyvind had two children mentioned in Egil's Saga: Finn Eyvindsson "the Squinter" and Geirlaug Eyvindsdottir. Finn married Gunnhild, daughter of a jarl named Halfdan and maternal granddaughter of King Harald. Their children included Eyvindr skáldaspillir, court skald to Haakon the Good. Another son, Njal Finnsson, settled in Hålogaland; his daughter was Astrid Nialsdotter, who appears in the Hervarar saga.

Another daughter, Rannveig, is mentioned in the Landnámabók. She is said to have married Sighvat the Red, a nobleman from Halogaland who settled in Bolstad, Iceland near Ketil Trout's landtaking. Rannveig and Sighvat had a number of children: (1) Sigmund Sighvatsson, who became the father of Mord Gig, Sigfus of Hlid, Lambi Sighvatsson, Rannveig, wife of Hamund Gunnarsson and Thorgerd, wife of Onund Bill; and (2) Barek Sighvatsson, the father of Thord, the father of Stein.
