= Bjalfi =

Norwegian hersir

Bjalfi was a ninth-century Norwegian hersir. He married Hallbera Ulfsdattir, the daughter of Ulf the Brave and sister of Hallbjorn Halftroll. With Hallbera Bjalfi was the father of Kveldulf Bjalfasson.
