= Salbjörg Káradóttir =

Salbjörg Káradóttir was a Norse woman of the late ninth century. She was the daughter of Berle-Kari and sister of Eyvind Lambi and Olvir Hnufa. Salbjörg is mentioned in Egil's saga, which says that she married Kveldulf Bjalfasson and had two children, Thorolf Kveldulfsson and Skallagrim Kveldulfsson, with him. She was the grandmother of the poet Egill Skallagrímsson, the main character of Egil's Saga.

Salbjörg is described in Egil's Saga as a very handsome woman, and as being skörungur mikill, an expression that has been translated as "exceptionally energetic", "full of spirit", or various adjectives denoting exceptional competence.
