= Kven =

Kven may refer to:

- Kven people, a Finnic ethnic group of Norway
- Kven language, the Finnic language spoken by them
- something from, or associated with, ancient Kvenland
- KVEN, an American radio station (1520 AM) licensed to Port Hueneme, California
- KVEN (Ventura, California), a defunct American radio station (1450 AM) licensed to Ventura, California

== See also ==
- Etymology of Kven
- Cwen (disambiguation)
- Cven (disambiguation)
- Kven Sea
