= Olvir Hnufa =

Norwegian hersir and skald of the late ninth and early tenth centuries

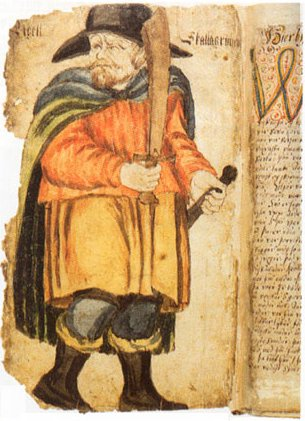
17th-century manuscript of Egil's Saga, with an image depicting Olvir's nephew Egil Skallagrimsson.

Olvir Hnufa or Ölvir hnúfa was a Norwegian commander in a clan and poet of the late ninth and early tenth centuries, known from, among other sources, Egil's Saga, Skaldatal and the Prose Edda. Olvir was the son of the viking Berle-Kari and brother-in-law of Kveldulf Bjalfason, who married Olvir's sister Salbjorg Karadottir; he was thus uncle to Skallagrim and Thorolf Kveldulfsson and great uncle to the famous poet Egil Skallagrimsson. Olvir also had a brother named Eyvind Lambi. Olvir was a prominent member of the court of King Harald Fairhair, who united Norway under his rule in the late ninth or early tenth century. Among other famous poets, he served as one of King Harald's court poets. He also served as a warrior in Harald's retinue, and fought at the pivotal Battle of Hafrsfjord on the king's flagship. He is best known for his involvement in the conflict between Harald and Olvir's kinsman Thorolf Kveldulfsson, which ended with the latter's death. Only a few fragments of Olvir's poetry survive.

== Name ==
The name Ölvir has been defined as "priest of the shrine/sanctuary". His nickname "hnufa" is something of a mystery. It is sometimes translated as hump; it is unknown whether this described a physical condition. However, it can also mean "snub", as in snub-nosed. Vigfusson pointed out that under Nordic law, "'hnufa' refers to a bondmaid whose nose has been cut off for theft thrice repeated; as a nickname it must refer to some hurt" suffered by Olvir.

== Career ==
Most of Olvir Hnufa's life is covered in three sagas, Egil's saga, Skaldatal and Prose Edda. Egils saga spans the years 850-1000 and covers the saga of the ancestors of Egill Skallagrímsson, including Olvir Hnufa. Skaldatal are poetries from Prose Edda about court poets. Prose Edda is an saga from the 13th century about the norse mythology, which is used to explain poetry from that era.

=== Viking career ===
Olvir and Eyvind joined their nephew Thorolf Kveldulfsson on a number of Viking expeditions after the latter received a longship as a gift from his father Kveldulf. They gained a great deal of profit from such voyages. At a thing in Gaular, Olvir fell in love with Solveig Atladottir, the daughter of a jarl in Fjordane named Atli the Slender. The jarl refused Olvir permission to marry the girl, but he was so smitten that he abandoned his Viking life to be near her. A poet of some talent, he composed a number of love poems for Solveig. For reasons not revealed in Egil's Saga, but probably related to his courtship of Solveig, Olvir was attacked and nearly killed in his home by Solveig's brothers shortly after King Harald of Vestfold's conquest of Møre. Atli did not long survive this encounter; after Harald Fairhair conquered Møre and Fjordane he assigned the governance of the former to Rognvald Eysteinsson and the latter to Hákon Grjótgarðsson. Hákon and Atli soon came into conflict over Sogn and fought a battle at Fjalir in Stafaness Bay, in which Hakon was killed. Atli was severely wounded in the battle and taken to a nearby island, where he died.

=== Life in Harald's court ===
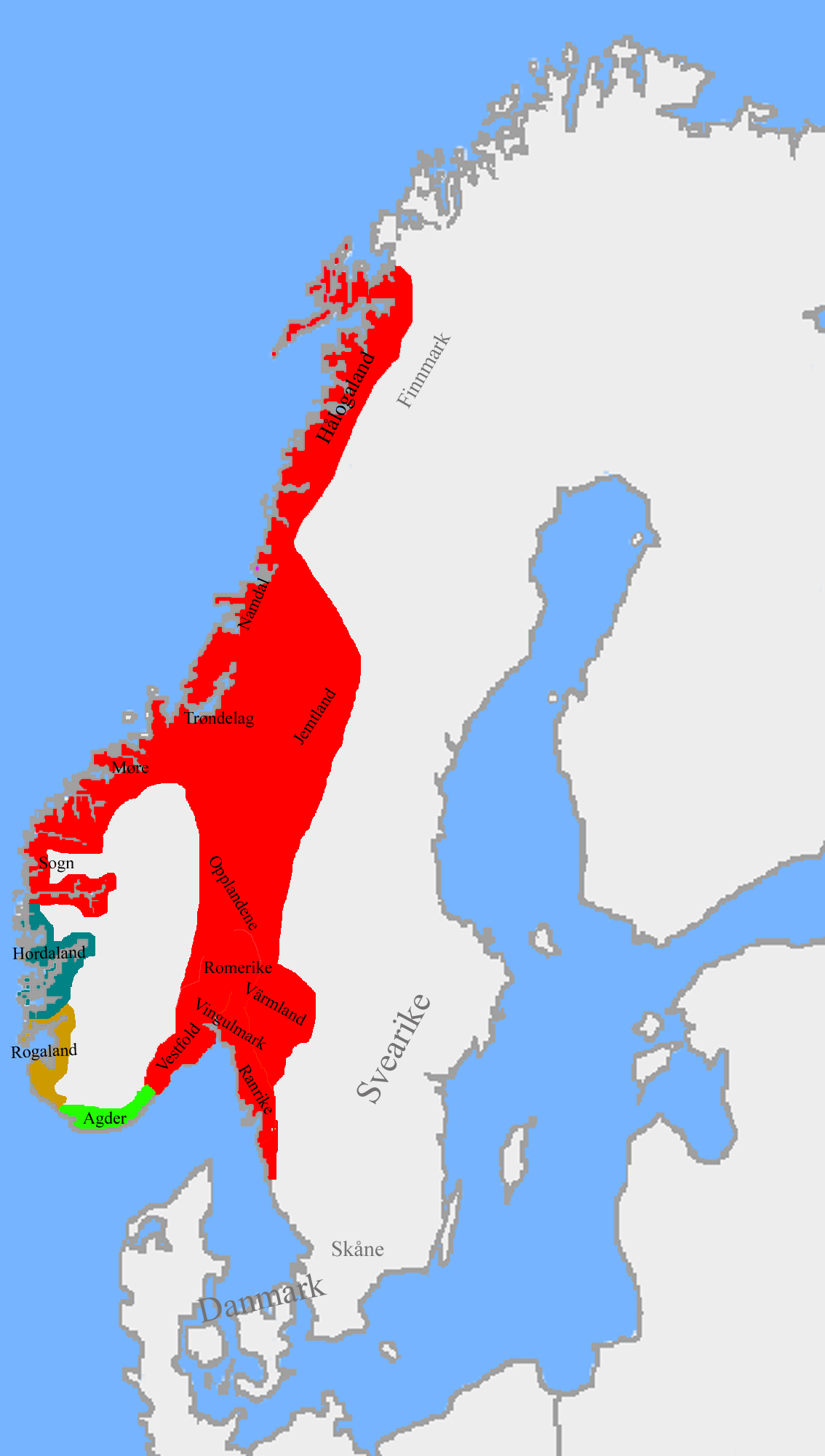
Norway ca. 872 CE (with Harald's kingdom shown in red) before the defining Battle of Hafrsfjord.

Fleeing his attackers, Olvir joined King Harald's retinue as a court poet, a post he would hold for many years along with such notables as Þorbjörn Hornklofi and Þjóðólfr of Hvinir.

Olvir mollified the king's rage when Kveldulf refused to come pay homage by convincing Thorolf to join Harald's clan, or armed retinue. Along with Thorolf and Eyvind Lambi, Olvir fought on Harald's ship at the Battle of Hafrsfjord (probably around 885). Over the years, both as a result of slander by Thorolf's enemies, and of Thorolf's growing popularity and power in northern Norway, Harald began to see him as a threat; despite Olvir's continuous attempts to ameliorate the deterioration in the relationship between the two.

Even when the king attacked Thorolf's farm, Olvir still pleaded to save his kinsman's life. After Thorolf was killed by Harald, the king gave his body to Olvir for burial. Olvir tried to convince Harald to pay damages for Thorolf but the king consistently refused, claiming that Thorolf was a traitor. Ultimately, Olvir went to Fjordane to tell Kveldulf and Skallagrim Kveldulfsson of Thorolf's death. Skallagrim went with Olvir to King Harald after Thorolf's murder. He demanded payment for damages, which resulted in his being chased out of the king's court. Together with his father Kveldulf, and their kinsman Ketil Trout, Skalla-Grimr took revenge by killing those of Harald's servants who took part in Thorolf's killing before fleeing to Iceland.

Following these events, Olvir begged Harald to permit him to leave the court and return to his own estate, saying that he had "no desire to sit with the men who murdered Thorolf". The king, however, refused, and, in the words of William Pencak, "Olvir, the would-be peacemaker who sold out to the king, is condemned to a life of praising his family's murderers."

Olvir's subsequent fate is not recorded. There is no record of his ever having married or having had children.

The Hauksbók contains a tale called the Skaldasaga Haralds harfagra ("Saga of the poets of Harald Fairhair") describing an expedition to Sweden undertaken by Olvir, Thorbjorn Hornklofi, and Audun Ill-skald to expiate an offense. Its historicity is disputed.

=== Poetry ===
Olvir is quoted by Snorri Sturluson in the Skaldskaparmal as having composed the following poetic fragment about the god Thor: "Æstisk allra landa umbgjörð ok sonr Jarðar." ("The encircler of all lands [The Midgard Serpent or Jörmungandr ] and Iord's son [Thor] became violent.") Another poetic fragment attributed to him in the Skaldatal reads: "Maðr skyldi þó molda megja hverr of þegja kenni-seiðs þó at kynni klepp-dæg Hárrs lægvar." ("Yet every man should know how to hold his peace even though -").

William Pencak compared Olvir's poetic career unfavorably with that of his grandnephew Egil: "A tyrant needs insincere poets to praise him, and Olvir's career illustrates the problem of artists and thinkers serving political ends ... the saga does not quote any of his poems. First Olvir is the slave of a woman, then of a king. The difference between his poetry and Egil's will demonstrate the opportunities for talent a free society opens up."
