= Faravid =

King of Kvenland mentioned in Egil's Saga

Faravid was a legendary King of Kvenland who is mentioned in the Icelandic Egils saga from the early 13th century. According to the saga, Faravid made an alliance with the Norwegian Thorolf Kveldulfsson to fight against Karelian invaders.

== Dating of the encounter ==
The surviving version of the saga was written only in 1240, with possible later influences. The saga mentions Faravid in a 9th-century context, but this is thought to be by Kyösti Julku and Mikko Häme too early to be credible as far as the Karelian attack is concerned. It is more likely that such encounter with Kvens and Karelians would have taken place in the 12th century. Karelians only became active in Lapland in the 11th century onwards. However, prof. Unto Salo states that it is possible to time the description to the beginning of the 11th century. Furthermore, on the same raid Thorolf hears that the Kylfings, who might be Novgorodians, are harassing the Sami. Thorolf proceeds to look for the kylfings slays 30 Kylfings that he finds. Unto Salo notes that the Novgorodian annals mention that Novgorod made a raid to Tavastia in 1042. This could have been a revenge for the attacks on the Kylfings and the Karelians.

== Saga's description of the encounter ==
In the saga Thorolf goes to Finnmark in the winter with hundred men and meets "in the far east" with some Kvens that state they have been sent by their king Faravid. They tell Thorolf that the Karelians (Kiriales) are harassing their land. The king's message to Thorolf was that this should bear him help. Thorolf would have a share of the booty equal to the king's share, and each of his men as much as two Kvens.

"With the Kvens the law was that the king should have one-third as compared with his men when the booty was shared, and beyond that, as reserved for him, all bearskins and sables. Thorolf put this proposal before his men, giving them the choice to go or not; and the more part chose to venture it, as the prize was so great. Thus it was decided that they should go eastwards with the messengers."

Thorolf makes a pact with Faravid and they attack Karelia together with three hundred of the king's men and hundred Norsemen (or, if a hundare is 120 men, 360 and 120, respectively). According to the saga they went by the "upper way" over Finnmark, and found the Karelians . These were the same ones who had before harried the Kvens. The Karelians formed for battle and faced to meet the Kvens and the Norsemen, expecting a victory as before. But when the battle started, the Norsemen charged, having stronger bearing shields than those of the Kvens (and Karelians?). Many Karelians fell, and the rest fled. King Faravid and Thorolf gained a great victory and won much spoil, and returned to Kvenland. Afterwards Thorolf and his men came to Finmark, parting in friendship from Faravid and Kvens.

Next winter Thorolf passed over the Keel mountains again with hundred men, went eastwards to Kvenland and met king Faravid. They took counsel together, and decided to go as in the winter before. With four hundred men they descended on Karelia (Kirialaland), and attacked those districts. Karelians matched the Kvens and the Norsemen in numbers. They took much booty, returning up to Finmark as the winter wore on.

== Historicity of Faravid ==
Egil's saga does not offer any details on Faravid. Only that he is the king of Kvenland and that he commands a troop of three hundare, perhaps 360 men, if the Kvens followed the tradition of Eastern Sweden. The saga naturally emphasises the role of the Norsemen in the raid and the battle but it is clear that the expedition was common. That Faravid was a "king" does not mean that he was necessarily a king of some realm but it does indicate that he was a chief comparable to a petty king, commanding his own troops.

The name Faravid is a Norse name, not Finnic, even though Kvens are generally thought to be Finnic. However, Faravid does not appear as a name in Scandinavia and it has been seen as a translation of Finnish "Kaukomieli" or "Kaukamoinen". Kaukomieli is also one of the names for the character of Lemminkäinen in the Kalevala, and Lemminkäinen himself is an amalgam of three folk poem heroes, Lemminkäinen, Kaukomieli and Ahti Saarelainen. The name Kaukomieli has been interpreted to mean "far traveler" or "far longing".

Satakunta region in Finland, where Kvenland has commonly been situated by research, along with Southern Ostrobothnia, has many village names starting with Kauko-. These can be dated to be either late Iron Age or early middle age villages and thus would fit the timing of the saga's description of Faravid. Furthermore, the municipality of Köyliö has an example of "Kaukamely" used as a surname from a document dated 1422. Köyliö has rich Iron Age cemeteries and clearly was one of the centres of pre-historic Finland. For example, a burial dated to 1025-1150 in Köyliö's C-burial ground (also known as "Lalli cemetery"), on the island in Köyliönjärvi, includes a sword with silver plated hilt, silver decorated axe, two spear heads and a silver ring, among other items. Next to the island where the burial ground is situated, there is a smaller island of Kaukoluoto, which is thought to derive its name from the personal name of Kauko. The burials in Köyliö's C-burial ground are among the richest known in Finland.

Thus, it is possible that Faravid (even though this might have not been his real name) was a real chief in the region today known as Finland although there is no other mention of him.
