= Cwen =

Cwen may be:

- an Old English term associated with Kvenland, an area in Scandinavia
  - Kven Sea
  - Kven people
  - Cwen language or Kven language
- an Old English word for "queen" or "woman"
- Society of Cwens, a former American honorary society

== See also ==
- Etymology of Kven
- Kven (disambiguation)
- Cven (disambiguation)
