= Kveldulf Bjalfason =

Viking Age Norwegian Warrior and landowner

- Born: Úlfr Bjálfason; 805; Norway
- Died: 878 (aged 72–73)
- Occupations: hersir, landownership, Skald
- Spouse: Salbjorg Karadottir
- Children: Thorolf Kveldulfsson; Skalla-Grímr
- Parent(s): Bjalfi, Hallbera Ulfsdóttir
- Writing career
- Language: Old Norse
- Period: Viking Age
- Notable works: Egils saga, Landnámabók
- Movement: Skaldic poetry

Ulf Bjalfason (Úlfr Bjálfason) (better known as Kveldulf, Old Norse for "Night Wolf") was a renowned hersir and landowner in ninth century Sogn, Norway. He is a main character in the early chapters of Egils saga and appears in the Landnámabók and other Icelandic sources. Kveldulf is described as an ulfhéðinn, a shape-shifter (hamrammr), or a berserker.

== Family ==
Kveldulf was the son of Bjalfi and Hallbera Ulfsdóttir, daughter of Ulf the Brave and sister of Hallbjorn Halftroll. He was thus first cousin to Ketil Trout of Halogaland and a kinsman of the latter's descendant, Ketil Trout of Namdalen. Kveldulf married Salbjorg Karadottir, the daughter of the Viking chieftain Berle-Kari; he was thus the brother-in-law of the Viking Eyvind Lambi and the skald Olvir Hnufa. Kveldulf and Salbjorg had two sons, Thorolf and Grim (who was better known as Skalla-Grímr or "Bald Grim").

== Opposition to King Harald ==
Kveldulf opposed the rising power of Harald Fairhair, king of Vestfold, but refused to join the coalition against Harald led by King Kjotve the Rich of Agder, and would not fight in the army of the kings of Sogn. He permitted his son Thorolf to join Harald's retinue and was permitted to live in peace despite failing to swear allegiance to the king.

== Death ==
When Thorolf was killed by King Harald's men, Kveldulf was overcome with grief and "took to his bed." After having a request for compensation refused by the king, Kveldulf and his son Skalla-Grímr took revenge by killing Thorolf's killers before fleeing Norway for Iceland. On the way, exhausted by his "berserker fit", the elderly Kveldulf died. Skallagrim built his farm at Borg, near where Kveldulf's coffin washed ashore.
