= Berle-Kari =

Viking chieftain

Berle-Kari (Berle-Kåre; Old Norse: Berðlu-Kári) was a viking chieftain who lived in ninth-century Norway. His home was at Berle (Old Norse: Berðla), in present-day Bremanger Municipality in Vestland county. Landnámabók names him as the son of Vemund, and brother of Skjoldolf, one of the early settlers of Iceland.

According to Egil's Saga, Kari was a berserker, and a comrade-at-arms of Ulf the Fearless (Úlfr inn óargi). (Note: This according to William Sayers, who points out Kvelulfr is mistakenly identified as Berle-Kari (Berðlu-Kári)'s partner.). The saga also Kari's three offspring as: Olvir Hnufa, who became a skald in the court of Harald I of Norway, Eyvind Lambi, who became one of Harald's hersirs, and a daughter, Salbjorg, who married Kveldulf Bjalfason. Kveldulf being grandson of the elder Ulf. (Note: Sayers is in agreement on this point.)
