= Ulf the Brave =

Norwegian hersir

Ulf the Brave (Úlfr inn óargi) was a Norwegian hersir who lived in Namdalen in the eighth century CE. He was the father of Hallbjörn Half-Troll and Hallbera Ulfsdóttir, who was the mother of Kveldúlfr Bjálfason. Thus Ulf the Brave was the ancestor of the clan of Egill Skallagrimsson. He is briefly mentioned in Egils Saga.

According to Skáldatal B (Codex Upsaliensis) Ulf was a skald and composed, in one single night, a drápa praising his own heroic deeds; after that accomplishment, he died before dawn came.

The drápa is not preserved.
