= Kvenland =

Historical region in Scandinavia

Kvenland, known in medieval sources by various names including Cwenland, Qwenland, and Kænland, is an ancient region in northern Scandinavia. Kvenland and the ethnonym Kven are only mentioned in a small number of historical accounts and remain a subject of scholarly debate. Kvenland was located somewhere east of Scandinavian Mountains, and is often suggested to have been located at the Bothnian Bay in northern parts of present-day Sweden and Finland.

The earliest surviving mention of Kvenland comes from an Old English Orosius, written in the late 9th century. This text is an Old English adaption of Historiae adversus paganos by Paulus Orosius (fl. c. 400), supplemented with information from the Norwegian chieftain and traveler Ohthere of Hålogaland. Ohthere described Cwenland and the conflicts between the Cwenas and the Northmen.

Historia Norwegiæ, a brief history of Norway probably written in the 12th century, also mentions Kvenland. The most detailed accounts appear in Icelandic sagas written in the 12th and 13th centuries, such as Egil's Saga and Hversu Noregr byggðist. These texts, composed centuries after the events they describe, portray Kvenland as a realm with its own kings. The relationship between the historical reality and the legendary elements within these sagas is a central question in the study of Kvenland.

== Medieval and older sources ==
=== Old English Orosius ===
A Norwegian adventurer and traveler named Ohthere visited England around 890 CE. King Alfred of Wessex had his stories written down and included them in his Old English version of a world history written by the Romano-Hispanic author Orosius. Ohthere's story contains the only contemporary description about Kvenland that has survived from the 9th century:

[Ohthere] said that the Norwegians' (Norðmanna) land was very long and very narrow ... and to the east are wild mountains, parallel to the cultivated land. Finnas inhabit these mountains ... Then along this land southwards, on the other side of the mountain (sic), is Sweden ... and along that land northwards, Kvenland (Cwenaland). The Kvens (Cwenas) sometimes make depredations on the Northmen over the mountain, and sometimes the Northmen on them; there are very large [freshwater] meres amongst the mountains, and the Kvens carry their ships over land into the meres, and thence make depredations on the Northmen; they have very little ships, and very light.

As emphasized in the text, Ohthere's account was an oral statement, made to King Alfred, and the section dealing with Kvenland takes up only two sentences. Ohthere's information on Kvens may have been second-hand, since, unlike in his other stories, Ohthere does not emphasize his personal involvement in any way. Ohthere's method of locating Kvenland can be interpreted to mean that Kvenland was located in and around the northern part of the modern-day Sweden and in the mid-western part of the modern-day Finland, when the difference in the Viking compass is taken into consideration (see more further below).

Ohthere's Finnas may be a reference to the Sami people, but not all historians agree on this. Although Ohthere does not give any name for the area where his "Finnas" lived, he gives a lengthy description of their lives in and around Northern Norway, without mentioning Kvens.

Ohthere's mention of the "large [freshwater] meres" and of the Kvens' boats are of great interest. The meres are said to be "amongst the mountains", the words used in the text being geond þa moras. Ohthere may be referring to the Southern Norwegian lake district, which is also referred to in Orkneyinga saga. This way, the reference would have included Lake Mjøsa, an area which is known to have been inhabited at that time: the Orkneyinga saga tells how these inhabitants were attacked by men from Kvenland.

The mention of the "very light ships" (boats) carried overland has a well-documented ethnographic parallel in the numerous portages of the historical river and lake routes in Fennoscandia and Northern Russia. According to the philologist Irmeli Valtonen, "[the] text does not give us a clear picture where the Cwenas are to be located though it seems a reasonable conclusion that they lived or stayed somewhere in the modern-day areas of Northern Sweden or Northern Finland."

The name Kven briefly appears later in King Alfred's Orosius. The Kven Sea is mentioned as the northern border for the ancient Germany, and Kvenland is mentioned again, as follows:

... the Swedes (Sweons) have to the south of them the arm of the sea called East (Osti), and to the east of them Sarmatia (Sermende), and to the north, over the wastes, is Kvenland (Cwenland), to the northwest are the nomadic people (Scridefinnas), and the Norwegians (Norðmenn) are to the west.

The Viking compass is believed to have had a 45-degree rotation of cardinal points. If the territories listed in King Alfred's Orosius are examined with that in mind, the Norwegians would be to the northwest of Sweden, and the nomadic people would be to the north. These points are correct after rotation based on the difference between the Viking and modern compasses. Kvenland is then situated to the northeast of Sweden and might be placed somewhere around the present-day Swedish Norrland or the western part of the present-day Finland. The information of Kvenland being situated "over the wastes", northwards from the Viking-period "Sweden" (corresponding roughly to the south-central part of present-day Sweden) matches the idea of Kvenland extending to Norrland. There is no "Finland" mentioned anywhere either in the original or the updated version of Orosius' history.

=== Hversu Noregr byggdist and Orkneyinga saga ===
Three medieval Icelandic accounts discuss Kvenland. They are Egils saga and the more legendary Hversu Noregr byggdist and Orkneyinga saga. According to Hversu Noregr byggdist, Kvens made sacrifices to Thorri, who "ruled over Gothland, Kvenland (Kænlandi) and Finland." According to Orkneyinga saga, Fornjót was "a king" who "reigned over Gotland, which we now know as Finland and Kvenland." It was located "to the east of the gulf that lies across from the White Sea (Gandvík); we call that the Gulf of Bothnia (Helsingjabotn)."

Orkneyinga saga contains a description of Nór traveling from Kvenland to Norway. This is how Nór started his journey to Norway:

But Nor, his brother, waited until snow lay on the moors so he could travel on skis. He went out from Kvenland and skirted the Gulf, and came to that place inhabited by the men called Sami (Lapps); that is beyond Finnmark.

Having traveled for a while, Nór was still "beyond Finnmark." After a brief fight with the Lapps, Nór continued:

But Nor went thence westward to the Kjolen Mountains and for a long time they knew nothing of men, but shot beasts and birds to feed to themselves, until they came to a place where the rivers flowed west of the mountains. — Then he went up along the valleys that run south of the fjord. That fjord is now called Trondheim.

Nór ended up attacking the area around Trondheim in central Norway and later the lake district in the south, conquering the country and uniting it under his rule. There is no mention of Kvenland after that. Again only a handful of words are devoted to Kvenland, mainly telling where it was.

Nór's journey from Kvenland to Norway is missing from Hversu, which in fact does not even mention that Nór came from Kvenland at all, only stating: "Norr had great battles west of the Keel". The journey may have been lifted from some other context and added to Orkneyinga saga in a later phase by an unknown author who wanted to make the saga more adventurous.

Whether Fornjót and his immediate descendants were actual historical people has been debated. Kyösti Julku notes that no geographical errors have been found in the descriptions of the Orkneyinga Saga. He asks why therefore the people described in the account should be considered not to have existed.

=== Egil's saga ===
Egil's Saga is an Icelandic saga likely written between 1220 and 1240 CE. Although the author is anonymous, scholarly tradition often attributes the work to Snorri Sturluson (1179–1241), a prominent Icelandic historian, poet, and politician.

The saga chronicles the lives of a Norwegian family over several generations. The narrative begins in Norway around 850 CE and concludes in Iceland around 1000 CE. It contains an account of an alliance between the hero's uncle, Thorolf Kveldulfsson, and a king of Kvenland named Faravid, in a campaign against Karelian raiders. Chapter XIV of the saga provides specific geographical information regarding Kvenland's location:

Finmark is a wide tract; it is bounded westwards by the sea, wherefrom large firths run in; by sea also northwards and round to the east; but southwards lies Norway; and Finmark stretches along nearly all the inland region to the south, as also does Hålogaland outside. But eastwards from Namdalen (Naumdale) is Jämtland (Jamtaland), then Hälsingland (Helsingjaland) and Kvenland, then Finland, then Karelia (Kirialaland); along all these lands to the north lies Finmark, and there are wide inhabited fell-districts, some in dales, some by lakes. The lakes of Finmark are wonderfully large, and by the lakes there are extensive forests. But high fells lie behind from end to end of the Mark, and this ridge is called Keels.

Like Hversu Noregr byggdist, Egils saga clearly separates Finland and Kvenland, listing them as neighboring areas. However, Finland is not listed in any of the saga's surviving versions, indicating that it might be a later addition by someone who did not recognize Kvenland any more. The saga says "eastwards from Namdalen is Jämtland", but actually the direction is southeast. Also Hälsingland is southeast, not east, of Jämtland. Since it is widely assumed that the Viking compass had a 45 degree rotation of cardinal points, the saga's "east" seems to correspond to the contemporary southeast.

In chapter XVII Thorolf goes to Kvenland again:

That same winter Thorolf went up on the fell with a hundred men; he passed on at once eastwards to Kvenland and met king Faravid.

Again, as with Ohthere, Finns and Kvens are not discussed at the same time. The saga tells how Norwegians taxed the Finns.

=== Other sources ===
Besides Old English Orosius, Hversu Noregr byggdist, Orkneyinga saga and Egil's saga, Kvenland or Kvens are very briefly mentioned in some Icelandic texts from the same era. One of the texts may have been written in Norway.

Norna-Gests þáttr has a brief mention of the king of Denmark and Sweden, Sigurd Hring (ruling in the mid-8th century), fighting against the Curonians and the Kvens:

Sigurd Ring (Sigurðr) was not there, since he had to defend his land, Sweden (Svíþjóð), since Curonians (Kúrir) and Kvens (Kvænir) were raiding there.

Historia Norwegiae was written sometime between 1160 and 1175 CE in an unknown location. It contains a list of peoples in the North:

But towards north many pagan tribes—alas!—stretch from the east behind Norway, namely Karelians (Kiriali) and Kvens (Kwæni), Horned Finns (cornuti Finni) and both peoples of Bjarmia (utrique Biarmones). But what tribes dwell behind them, have we no certainty.

The Icelandic Annals have a late mention of Kvens clearly active in the North. Around 1271 CE, the following is said to have happened:

Then Karelians (Kereliar) and Kvens (Kvænir) pillaged widely in Hålogaland (Hálogaland).

=== Possible other sources ===
In some pre-medieval and medieval texts, it is not clear which groups of people the authors are referring to by the titles used. According to historians, terms used for either the Kvens, Finns and/or Sami in texts written during the 1st millennium AD include the following:

- Aeni, Aeningia (in reference to Fenningia) – by Pliny the Elder c. 77 AD;
- Fenni, Sitones – by Publius (or Gaius) Cornelius Tacitus, c. 98;
- Phinnoi – by Ptolemy, c. 150;
- Qwnio, Qwens – by Ulfilas (in Gothic: Wulfila), c. 352;
- Finni, Finnaithae, Screrefennae, Vinoviloth, Adogit – by Jordanes, c. 550;
- Finnas, Scriðefinnas – in Widsith, c. 600;
- Skridfinnar, Winnili – by Paul the Deacon, c. 790

The word Finn (Old Norse: finnr) in most contexts refers to the Sami people. However, older authors did not necessarily distinguish between the Sami and Finnic-speaking peoples, whose languages are related to each other, and the term can be ambiguous.

According to Finnish historian Kyösti Julku the Germanic tribe Sitones mentioned in Tacitus' Germania in 98 CE lived in the area in northern Fennoscandia claimed to be Kvenland, saying "There can be no confusion about the geographical location of the Sitones."

== Different interpretations ==
=== Kvenland and Kainuu ===
Kvenland has generated many theories about its origin, the location of Kvenland east of the Bay of Bothnia has, however, been an unchanging feature of most interpretations since the 17th century, when the Swedish historians Johannes Messenius and Olaus Rudbeckius first noted the concept of Kvenland in Old Norse sources. In 1650, Professor Michael Wexionius from Turku became the first to associate Kvenland with the Finnish Kainuu. In the 18th century the Finnish historian Henrik Gabriel Porthan, among others, focused attention on the Ohthere passage mentioning the Cwenas. Whereas Porthan suggested that the ancient Kvens may have been Swedish, many others came to view the Kvens as an ancient Finnish tribe.

Nowadays Kainuu is a name of an inland province in northeastern Finland. In the past the name Kainuu was often used of the more western coastal area around the Bay of Bothnia, even up to the 19th century. In the early Umesaami dictionaries the terms Kainolads and Kainahalja described Norwegian and Swedish men and women respectively.

=== Kvenland and Pohjola ===
In a theory somewhat closely related to the Kainuu theory, Kvenland has also been associated with the legendary Pohjola. Pohjola is an other-worldly country in Finnish mythology, ruled by a fierce witch called Louhi. Pohjola is best known from the Kalevala, a 19th-century Finnish work of epic poetry compiled by Elias Lönnrot from Karelian and Finnish oral folklore and mythology, collected largely in the Finnish region of Kainuu.

Different interpretations of the origins of the mythical Pohjola exist. Some include parts of Lapland and the ancient Kainuu (same as Kvenland according to common view today) in Kalevala's Pohjola. Some point out a similarity with the name Pohjanmaa (Ostrobothnia in English), a historical region in western Finland.

=== Other interpretations ===
An original view has been provided by a Finnish historian and Helsinki University professor, Matti Klinge, who has placed Kvenland/Kainuu not only in southern Finland, but around the Baltic Sea as a kind of Finnish-Swedish "maritime confederation". Klinge has presented a hypothesis of Kvenland as a naval power on the Baltic, located on both the present-day Finnish and Swedish sides of the Gulf of Bothnia as well as in some of the surrounding areas. The folklorist and professor of literature Väinö Kaukonen calls it "fantastic fabulation" and a "dream-wish".

Professor Emeritus in Archeology at the University of Turku, Unto Salo has also proposed that "Kvens/Kainulaiset" were men of Satakunta in Southern Finland. There is archeological evidence linking Satakunta and Lapland (for example types of skis) but skipping the areas between which suggests that expeditions were undertaken from Satakunta to the North during the late Viking Age. Further, toponomy suggests that there were regular routes used by the people of Satakunta to get to the North. Lastly, haapio, a type of a very light dugout boat was used extensively in Satakunta and would have been ideal for such expeditions. Unto Salo speculates that the name Haaparanta ("Aspen shore") in the Northern Sweden (county of Norrbotten) would have been given due to presence of asps needed to build haapios. Originally Kvenland was more likely situated in the Southern-Ostrobothnia but when this habitation disappeared in the early 9th century for unknown reasons, the Norwegians continued to apply the term Kven to the men of Satakunta and Häme who inherited the Northern trade and taxation.

=== Woman Land ===
Different views exist of why ancient scholars have made references to Kvenland as an area dominated by women. Some have suggested that there may have been misinterpretations of terminology. Whatever the etymological origin of the element kven, it effortlessly translates to "woman" in Old Norse. Proto-Germanic *kwinōn, *kunōn, *kwēni-z and *kwēnō for 'woman' developed into kona, kvǟn, kvān, kvɔ̄n, kvendi, kvenna and kvinna in Old Norse. It is plausible that this led learned speakers of Old Norse to identify Kvenland with the land of the Amazons in Greek legend; Adam of Bremen, for example, often mentions Amazons in writing of the far North.

Among sources used in the related debate by historians is the following statement of Tacitus from c. 98 CE:

"Upon the Suiones, border the people Sitones; and, agreeing with them in all other things, differ from them in one, that here the sovereignty is exercised by a woman. So notoriously do they degenerate not only from a state of liberty, but even below a state of bondage."

According to a view shared by many historians, the term Sitones (Kvens) shares etymological roots with Sigtuna, which much later had a Latin spelling Situne. According to Disas saga, the Sitones were ruled by a queen. According to a common view, the "queen" of the Sitones either derives from or is a possible linguistic confusion of an Old Norse term used for 'woman', which shares linguistic origins with the term used in reference to the Kvens. According to Thomas William Shore, the English language term queen derives from the term qwen, a spelling used for the Kvens e.g. by Wulfila in c. 352 CE and King Alfred the Great of Wessex in c. 890 CE. In 1075 AD, in Gesta Hammaburgensis ecclesiae pontificum, the German chronicler Adam of Bremen calls Kvenland Women's Land, stating the following:

Meanwhile Swedes (Sueones), who had expelled their bishop, got a divine revenge. And at first King's son called Anund, whose father had sent him to enlarge his kingdom, after arriving to Women's Land (patriam feminarum), whom we consider to be Amazons, was killed along with his army from poison, that they had mixed to the spring water. (III 15)

"After that come the Swedes (Sueones) that rule wide areas up until the "Land of Women" (terram feminarum). Living east of these are said to be Wizzi, Mirri, Lamiy, Scuti and Turci up until the border of Russia (Ruzziam)." (IV 14)

In the related debate references are sometimes also made to the Finnish epic Kalevala, according to which Pohjola was ruled by a woman called Louhi or Pohjan-akka. The ancient Norse knew the Northern ruler-goddesses by the names gýgjar (singular: gýgr) and íviðjur (singular: íviðja). There is also a reference to a northern land of women in an Icelandic manuscript from the 14th century, which describes a kuenna land ('woman land').

=== Different theories on the origins of the Kvens ===
In 1958, a Finnish historian, politician and University of Helsinki professor, Kustaa Vilkuna, suggested that Kainuu or Kvenland was originally in Southern Finland, on the Gulf of Bothnia and covering just northern Southwest Finland and coastal Satakunta. A small local area called Kalanti (Kaland in Swedish) would have been a remnant of the earlier name Kvenland. Because of the trading and tribute-taking expeditions as well as settlement expansion of the kainulaiset, the territorial concept of Kainuu was gradually moved northward.

Another mid-20th-century historian, Professor Jalmari Jaakkola, considered the Kvens or kainulaiset as long-range hunters and tribute-takers coming from Upper Satakunta, from the inland region surrounding the present-day city of Tampere. This theory was supported by Professor Armas Luukko.

In 1979, Professor Pentti Virrankoski of the University of Turku presented a hypothesis according to which Kainuu was originally the sedentary Iron Age settlement in Southern Ostrobothnia. After the settlement was supposedly destroyed by tribal warfare during the early 9th century, the kainulaiset became dispersed along the western coasts of Finland, leaving only place-names and some archaeological finds as permanent traces.

In 1980, the University of Oulu professor Jouko Vahtola pointed out that there is no evidence of the name Kainuu being of Western Finnish origin and considered it to have Eastern Finnish roots. However, he suggested a common Germanic etymology for the names Kainuu and Kvenland. Like most of his predecessors, Vahtola viewed Kainuu/Kvenland as the name of the coastal Ostrobothnia, meaning roughly "low-lying land". Based on the archaeological knowledge of the north, Vahtola did not believe that there was a separate Iron Age tribe called Kvens. He considered the Kvens to be mainly Tavastians hunting and trading in northern Ostrobothnia, thus partially reproducing the view of Jaakkola and Luukko (Upper Satakunta being a part of traditional Tavastia). This theory is nowadays widely adopted in Finland, Sweden and Norway, and it is cited in many studies and popular works.

In 1995 the Finnish linguist Jorma Koivulehto gave support for the theory of common etymological roots of the names Kainuu and Kvenland. He suggests a new etymology meaning roughly "marine gap-land", the "marine gap" being the northern sea-route on the Bothnian Gulf.

Increasing archaeological fieldwork in northern Finland has cast some doubts on the idea of Kvenland having almost no sedentary settlements. Encouraged by the new findings, Professor Kyösti Julku of Oulu University presented a theory of the Kvens being early permanent Finnish inhabitants of Northern Finland and Norrbotten (a part of modern-day Sweden).

Some Swedish historians have suggested that the ancient Kvens were actually a Scandinavian and not a Finnish group, but these views have little support nowadays. The Swedish archaeologist Thomas Wallerström suggests that the Kvens/kainulaiset was a collective name for several Finnic groups participating in the west-east fur-trade, not just southern Finns but ancestors of Karelians and Vepsians as well. In this case, the land of the Kvens would have extended from the Bothnian Gulf in the west to the Lake Onega in the east.

== Kvens later in historical time ==
As a name for a country or geographical region, the name Kvenland seems to gradually have gone out of ordinary usage in the course of the late Middle Ages.

In 1328, Tälje Charter (Tälje stadga)—the oldest known record written in Swedish—mention the Birkarls (bircharlaboa). Based on the information revealed, the Birkarls then inhabited areas, e.g., in Northern Hälsingland, which covered the western coast of the Gulf of Bothnia, and from there all the way up and around the gulf to Oulu River. Tälje Charter is a state treaty ratified between the Kvens and the Swedish crown, in which the king of Sweden guarantees the Birkarl Kvens trading and tax-collecting rights as chief enforcement officers, bailiffs (Swedish: fogde), in the North.

In his 1539 map Carta Marina, Swedish Olaus Magnus places Birkarl Kvens (Berkara Qvenar) on the Norwegian North Atlantic coast, roughly in the middle in between the archipelago of Lofoten and the modern-day city of Tromsø. In his 1555 Historia de Gentibus Septentrionalibus (A Description of the Northern Peoples), he also mentions both terms: the Finnish traders who commuted between and inhabited the general area of Tornio and the modern-day area of Norway are said to have been called Kvens.

The earliest remaining Norwegian tax records, stored at the National Archival Services of Norway (Riksarkivet), dating to the mid-16th century, also mention Kvens. Today, the term Kven is used in Norway in reference to the descendants of Finnish-speaking people who have inhabited or migrated to the present-day area of Norway anytime before World War II. Migration waves from the 16th century onward have brought Finnish settlers to Northern Norway from the modern-day areas of Northern Sweden and Northern Finland, mostly from the northern coastal areas of the Bay of Bothnia.

=== Caijaners ===
In 1604 Swedes founded a castle named Cajanaborg on an island on the Kajaani river (the ruins of the castle are now the center of Kajaani, the capital of the Kainuu region). Shortly afterwards, in 1607, King Charles IX of Sweden called himself the ruler of the "Caijaners". His full title read:

"Carl then nijonde, Sweriges, Göthes, Wendes, Finnars, Carelers, Lappers i Nordlanden, the Caijaners och Esters i Lifland, etc. Konung" (Translation from Swedish to English: "Charles IX, King of the Swedes, Goths, Wends, Finns, Karelians, Lapps in the Northland, the Caijanians, and Estonians in Livonia, etc.").

In the view of Kyösti Julku, the Old Norse kvenir, the Swedish Caijaner, and the Finnic kainulainen/kainuulainen are equivalent terms referring to the same group in different languages. Charles IX's claim is sometimes translated as "king of the Kvens".

This northern policy formed part of Charles IX's broader arctic ambitions, which included asserting Swedish sovereignty over Finnmark, a territory also claimed by Denmark–Norway. His claims contributed to escalating tensions with King Christian IV of Denmark, ultimately leading to the Kalmar War (1611–1613), in which Sweden was forced to abandon its claims to northern Norway. In 1611, Charles died and was succeeded by his son Gustavus Adolphus, who dropped the reference to Lappers (the Sámi) and Caijaners from his title.

== Kvenland theory ==
Since the 1990s claims have arisen, primarily among some Tornedalians, that Kvens (Tornedalians and Norwegian Kvens) are in fact not only an indigenous population, but the indigenous population of northern Fennoscandia. These claims coincide with struggles with Sámi over rights to hunting, fishing and reindeer herding in the areas inhabited by both groups. While it is hard to prove without a doubt, a relationship between the ancient Kvens and modern Tornedalians and Kvens is generally believed. The claim that the Sámi are not indigenous is however widely discredited.

The National Association of Swedish Tornedalians (STR-T) supports the recognition of Tornedalians, Kvens and Lantalaiset as an indigenous population, but denies the claim that the Sámi are not indigenous. Likewise the Norwegian Kven Organization (Ruijan kveeniliito) recognises the indigeneity of the Sámi peoples.

== See also ==
- Bjarmaland
- Hålogaland
- Tornedalians
- Birkarls
- Kylfings
- Kven language
