= Redvald Knudtson =

Norwegian farmer and politician

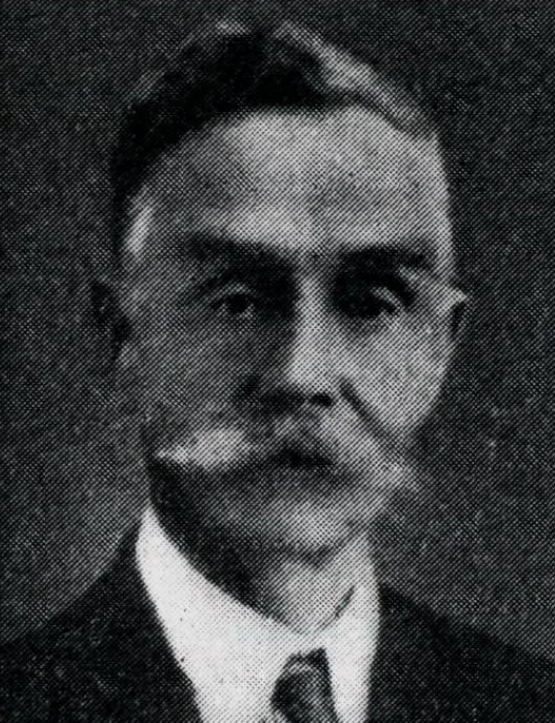

Redvald Knudtson (4 March 1870 – 29 June 1956) was a Norwegian newspaper editor and politician for the Labour Party.

He was born at Rolstadli in Sør-Fron Municipality as a son of farmers Knudt Pedersen Rolstadli and Embjørg Amundsdatter née Wangen. He started his career as a construction labourer. From 1895 to 1898 he was a foreman during the construction of Agdenes Fortress, before supervising construction at Oscarsborg Fortress from 1898 to 1901 and Kykkelsrud power station in 1902.

In 1902 Knudston moved to Mo i Rana. He established a printing press and the newspaper Dunderlandsdølen, which he edited from 1902 to 1947. He was among the founders of the Union of General Workers and Labour Party locally. Dunderlandsdølen was published as Helgelands Fremtid from 1918, was defunct from the summer of 1921 and restarted as Dunderlandsdølen in January 1920. It was also stopped during the German occupation of Norway from 1941 to 1945. The newspaper was a private enterprise from the start, was owned by Mo Labour Party from 1916 and was an official Labour Party newspaper from 1920.

Knudtson was elected to the municipal council for Mo Municipality in 1908 and served until 1937, including stints as deputy mayor from 1911 to 1916 and mayor from 1917 to 1922. He was elected as a deputy representative to the Parliament of Norway for the terms 1916–1918 and 1928–1930. During his first term, he was elected as Bolstad's running mate from the single-member constituency Nordre Helgeland. Knudtson met in parliamentary session from 12 July 1918 and throughout the year.

Knudtson worked for the establishment of Mo electricity works, and served as a board member for several years. He also worked for the establishment of Bodø Hospital, was active in the temperance movement and the cooperative movement. He died in June 1961.
