= Thorolf Skallagrímsson =

10th-century Icelandic Viking and warrior

Thorolf Skallagrímsson (Old Norse: Þórólfr Skallagrímsson [ˈθoːrˌoːlvz̠ ˈskɑlːɑˌɡriːmsˌson]; Modern Icelandic: Þórólfur Skallagrímsson [ˈθouːrˌoulvʏr ˈskatlaˌkrimsˌsɔːn]) is an Icelandic character in Egils saga. He is brother of Egill Skallagrímsson and oldest son of Skallagrím Kveldulfsson and Bera Yngvarsdóttur. He closely resembles in looks and manner his uncle and namesake, Thorolf Kveldulfsson.

Thorolf is well known for his travels with Bjorn and giving his own ship to Eric Bloodaxe to help lessen the grudge held against him by Eric’s father Harald Fairhair. This grudge was in place due to Thorolf’s father and grandfather seeking revenge by killing Harald’s servants for Thorolf Kveldulsson’s murder.

The feud between Skallagrim and Bloodaxe, however, continued with the present of a poorly crafted axe that Skallagrim tried to return to Bloodaxe but Thorolf instead intercepted the return and in turn gave Harald thanks instead. Thorolf’s downfall came during a battle fighting for King Athelstan against King Olaf’s army, after which his brother Egil buried him.
