= Thorolf =

- Gender: Male
- Language: Old Norse

Origin
- Meaning: Thor's wolf
- Region of origin: Scandinavia

Thorolf is an Old Norse masculine personal name. It means "Thor's wolf." Notable people with the name include:

- Thorolf Bugge (1879–1935), Norwegian trade unionist and politician
- Thorolf Holmboe (1866–1935), Norwegian painter, illustrator and designer
- Thorolf Kveldulfsson, 9th-century Norwegian chieftain and Viking
- Thorolf Beyer Mowinckel (1884–1963), Norwegian businessman and politician
- Thorolf Rafto (1922–1986), Norwegian human rights activist
- Thorolf Skallagrímsson, 10th-century Icelandic Viking and warrior, nephew of Thorolf Kveldulfsson
- Thorolf Vogt (1888–1958), Norwegian geologist and Arctic explorer
