= Auðunn illskælda =

Auðunn illskælda (Old Norse "the bad skald") was a 9th-century Norwegian skald. Skáldatal lists him as one of Harald Finehair's skalds. Egils saga Skallagrímssonar notes that he was Harald's oldest skald, and had earlier been a skald for Harald's father Hálfdan svarti. He was called illskælda because he had once in a drápa about Harald copied a refrain from another skald called Úlfr Sebbason. The drápa was subsequently called Stolinstefja "the drápa with the stolen refrain". Only a few stanzas of his works are known today.

The Hauksbók contains a tale called the Skaldasaga Haralds harfagra ("Saga of the Skalds of Harald Fairhair") describing an expedition to Sweden undertaken by Olvir Hnufa, Thorbjorn Hornklofi, and Auðunn to expiate an offense. Its historicity is disputed.
