= Cven =

Cven may refer to:

- Cven, Ljutomer, a village in Slovenia
- ŠD Cven, a Slovenian football club

== See also ==
- Kven (disambiguation)
- Cwen (disambiguation)
