= Rana Blad =

Norwegian newspaper

Rana Blad is a daily, regional newspaper published in Mo i Rana, Norway and covering Northern Helgeland.

It was started as Dunderlandsdølen in 1902 and edited by Redvald Knudtson continuously from 1947, with its name being Helgelands Fremtid from 1918 to 1920. The newspaper was also defunct from the summer of 1920 to January 1921, as well as 1941 to 1945 when the Nazi authorities shut it down during the German occupation of Norway. When the newspaper took the name Rana Blad in 1947, it was published three times a week, but became daily in 1956, three years after it surpassed its competitor Helgeland in circulation size. Dunderlandsdølen and Rana Blad were officially aligned with the Labour Party. The newspaper was owned by A-Pressen from 1990.
