= Hallbera Ulfsdóttir =

9th century Norse woman

Hallbera Ulfsdóttir was a Norse woman of the early ninth century CE. She was the daughter of Ulf the Brave. Hallbera married Bjalfi and bore him the son Kveldulf Bjalfasson; she was thus an ancestor of the clan of Egill Skallagrimsson.
