= Kylfings =

People of Northern Europe during the Viking Age

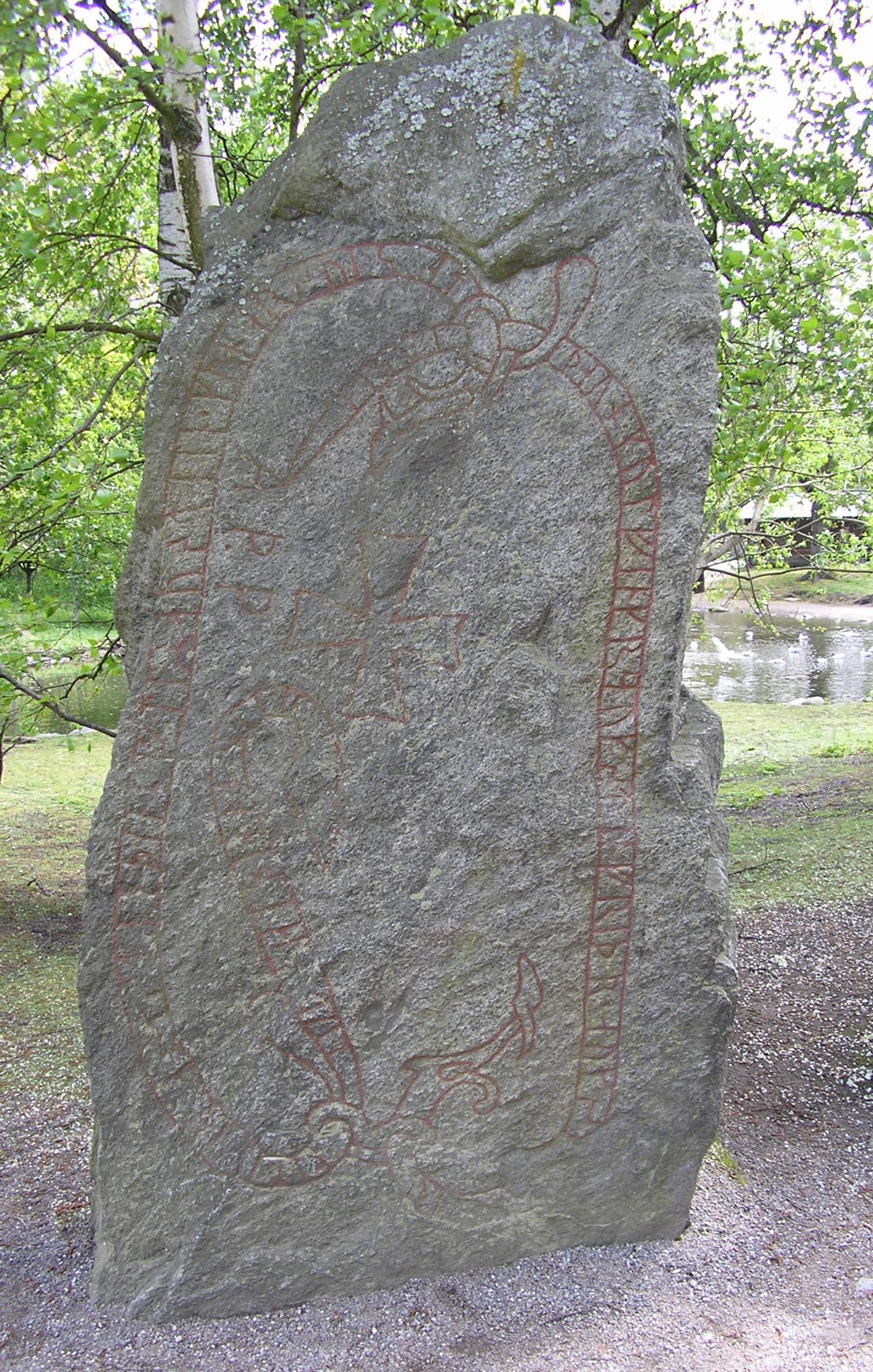
The Norslunda runestone bearing runic inscription U 419, which mentions the personal name Kylfingr

The Kylfings (Old Norse Kylfingar; Estonian Kalevid; Hungarian Kölpények; Old East Slavic Колбяги, Kolbiagi; Byzantine Greek Κουλπίγγοι, Koulpingoi; Arabic al-Kilabiyya) were a people of uncertain origin active in Northern Europe during the Viking Age, roughly from the late ninth century to the early twelfth century. They could be found in areas of Lapland, Russia, and the Byzantine Empire that were frequented by Scandinavian traders, raiders and mercenaries. Scholars differ on whether the Kylfings were ethnically Finnic or Norse. Also disputed is their geographic origin, with Denmark, Sweden and the Eastern Baltic all put forward as candidates. Whether the name Kylfing denotes a particular tribal, socio-political, or economic grouping is also much debated.

They are mentioned on the Viking runestones, the sagas of Icelanders (most notably in Egil's Saga), and Old Norse poetry such as Þorbjǫrn hornklofi's Hrafnsmál, as well as Byzantine records and Rus' lawcodes. According to the sagas, the Kylfings opposed the consolidation of Norway under Harald Fairhair and participated in the pivotal late ninth century Battle of Hafrsfjord. After Harald's victory in that battle, they are described in the sagas as having raided in Finnmark and elsewhere in northern Norway and having fought against Harald's lieutenants such as Thorolf Kveldulfsson.

== Etymology ==
The exact etymology of the word kylfing is disputed and many different theories have been put forward as to its ultimate origin. The general trend has been to trace kylfing to the Old Norse words kylfa and kolfr, but scholars disagree as to the meaning of these words as well. Cleasby notes that in Old Norse, kylfa can mean a club or cudgel. Thus the national Icelandic antiquarian Barði Guðmundsson translated Kylfing to mean "club-wielders". As Foote points out, it can also mean a smaller stick, such as a tally-stick or wooden token used by merchants, and, according to Jesch, it can also mean the "highest and narrowest part" of a ship's stem. Holm discussed the term kylfa in connection with the word hjúkolfr which means "meeting" or "guild"; according to Holm, the second element kolfr could refer to a symbolic arrow traditionally used as a device to summon people for a meeting.

These varied derivations have led to a number of interpretations. Holm offers two meanings: "archer" and "man armed with a cudgel". A number of historians have asserted that Kylfing referred to a member of a "club in the social or Anglo-American sense", a "brotherhood" or a member of a Norse félag. In a number of minor Icelandic manuscripts on mathematics and geography, Kylfingaland is identified as Garðaríki, i.e. Kievan Rus', but the sources are unclear as to whether Kylfingaland is named for the Kylfings or vice versa, or whether, indeed, there is any connection at all.

The Russian cognate of Kylfing is Kolbjag, following the pattern of development *kolƀing (*kulƀing) > *kolƀęg > kolbjag. The Kolbiagi were a group of foreign merchant-venturers and mercenaries mentioned in a number of Old Russian sources. They are often mentioned together with the Varangians, a term used in Eastern Europe to describe traders and pirates of the Baltic sea. In Byzantine Greek, they were named koulpingoi and they served as a unit of the Byzantine army listed alongside the Varangian Guard, which was of Scandinavian origin.

A very different derivation was put forward by the Russian scholar B. Briems. He hypothesised that Kylfingr was a direct Norse translation of the Votic self-designation Vadja used by the Votes, a Finnic people living in Ingria, Russia. The Votic word vadja (cognate with Finnish vaaja) means 'club', which corresponds to the Old Norse word kylfa. A non-Norse origin was also proposed by Julius Brutzkus, who argued that both Varangian and Kylfing derived from the Turkic languages, particularly the Bulgar and Khazar languages. Brutzkus asserted that Varangian came from the Turkic root varmak ("to walk, travel") while Kylfing was a Norse pronunciation of the Slavic kolbiagi, itself deriving from the Turkic phrase köl-beg ("sea-king"); under this interpretation the word Kylfing would be more or less synonymous with "Viking".

== Identity ==
According to Egil's Saga, the Kylfings were trading and plundering in Finnmark around the year 900. Thorolf Kveldulfsson, King Harald's tax agent in northern Norway, engaged Saami scouts to monitor the Kylfings' movements and report back to him. Countering their raids, he is reported to have killed over a hundred Kylfing marauders.

Some scholars see them as Scandinavians while others consider them to have been a Finnic tribe, and assert a connection between the word Kylfing and the Finnish, Saami, and Karelian myths of Kaleva. Elsewhere they are described as a mixture of Norse and Finnish people who were employed as mercenaries and tax-agents by Scandinavian rulers; in this context Ravndal interpreted the kylfa element to refer to a "club" in the sense of organization. Arbman argues that the Kolbiagi were a separate fur-trading guild. Postan et al., on the other hand, hypothesize that Kolbiag denoted a junior participant in a Varangian trade guild, rather than a separate group.

=== Finnic peoples ===
Holm (1992) considers Egil's saga to equate the Kylfings with the Finnic Karelians. In the 14th century, when the Swedish kings began to direct their attention northwards and encourage Swedish colonization in Norrbotten, there were regulations that the Birkarls and the Saami peoples were not to be interrupted in their traditional activities. A large part of the Karelians were under Novgorod which was included in what Icelandic sources called Kylfingaland, and thus the Kylfings could have been Baltic Finnish tribes under Novgorod.

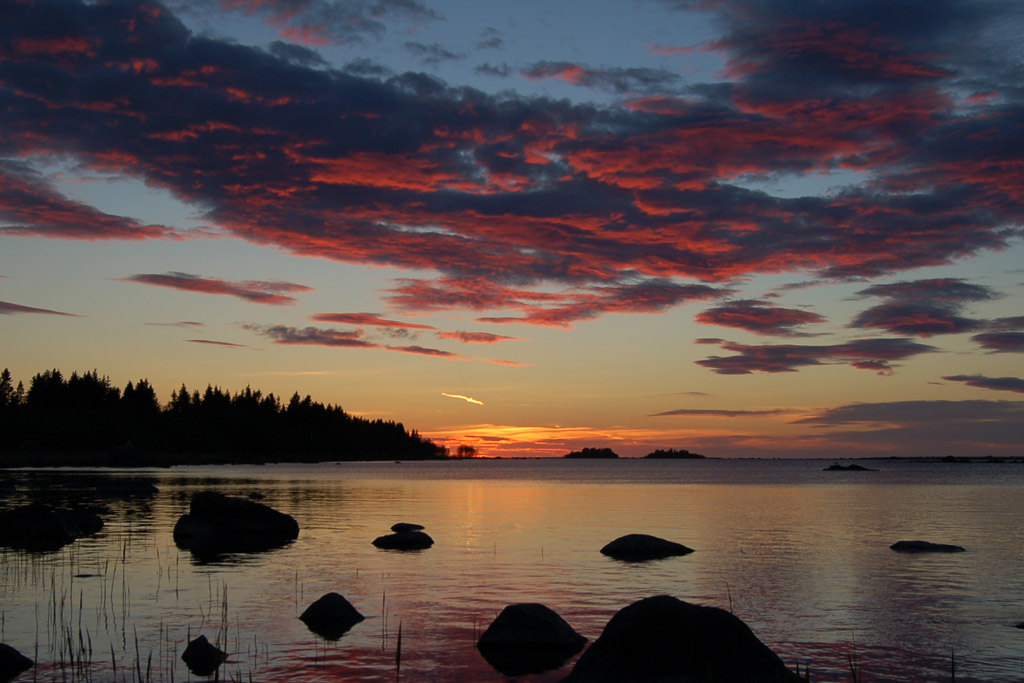
The eastern shore of the Gulf of Bothnia, proposed by proponents of a Finnic origin for the Kylfings as that group's homeland

Both East Slavs and Byzantines consistently made a clear distinction between Varangians and Kylfings, and Byzantines distinguished between them in the same manner as they separated Franks from Saracens. According to Holm such separations are indicative of clear ethnic differences between the two groups. Additionally, both East Slavic and Byzantine sources explicitly associate the Varangians with Baltic region, which they called Varangia, and in Arabic, the Baltic Sea was called Bahr Varank, i.e. the "Varangian Sea". There are no comparable connections when they mention the Kylfings. Another difference is the fact that the Byzantine sources connect the word varangoi with rhōs in order to make it clear that the rhōs-varangoi and the varangoi originate in Baltic just like the rhōs, but do not establish the same associations for the koulpingoi.

The Kylfings have also been identified with the Votic people. Carl Christian Rafn, Edgar V. Saks, B. Briem and Sigurður Nordal have proposed Kylfings to have been the Norse name for the Votes. The reason is that the ethnonym Vadja(laiset) can be associated with the word vadja (modern Estonian vai') which means "stake", "wedge" or "staff", which corresponds to Old Norse kolfr. Vadjalaiset would consequently be translated into Old East Norse as kolfingar, which in Old West Norse (Old Icelandic) would be umlauted as kylfingar. Whereas some native names were Scandinavized, as Rostov into Ráðstofa, the Norse learned of the meaning of other names and translated them, which they did at Volkhov, and in the case of some of the Dniepr rapids. The theory that the Kylfings were Votes has been opposed by Max Vasmer and Stender-Petersen, whereas Holm finds it likely. Holm considers it apparent that the Varangians and the Finnic tribes were able to cooperate well, and he points to the relative ease and stability with which Finland was later integrated as a part of the Swedish kingdom. Finnish linguist Jorma Koivulehto disagrees with the Vote theory and maintains that the Votic name or any other Finnic ethnonym is not etymologically connected with the name Kylfingar.

=== Scandinavians ===
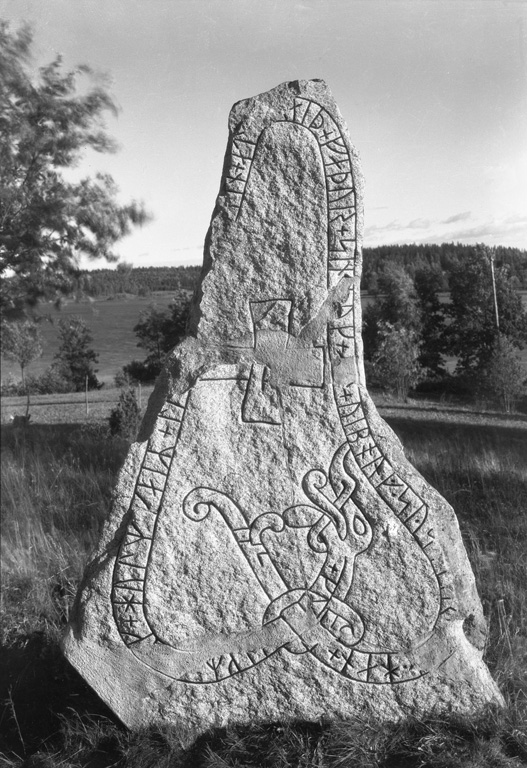
Runestone Sö 318, containing the personal name Kylfingr

Barði Guðmundsson identified the Kylfings as an East Scandinavian, possibly Swedish, tribe that infiltrated northern Norway during the late ninth century. Guðmundsson connects the Kylfings with the Germanic Heruli who were active throughout northern Europe and in Italy during the fifth and sixth centuries. According to Guðmundsson, many of these Kylfings may ultimately have emigrated to Iceland during the ninth and tenth centuries. Other scholars have assigned a Danish origin to this tribe.

Some scholars have considered the Kylfings of Egil's Saga to be a "conquering Germanic people", or the Swedish king's tax collectors. Holm (1992) considers such suggestions to be anachronistic because the Swedish kings lacked any interest in northern Fenno-Scandia during the ninth and tenth centuries, and not even the later law of Hälsingland mentions any Swedish settlement north of Bygdeå in southern Västerbotten.

Pritsak identified the Kylfings as a "professional trading and mercenary organization" that organized expeditions northward, into the Saami lands, as distinct from other Varangian and viking groups whose expeditions focussed on lands to the west and east of Scandinavia. This interpretation is supported by such historians as Stender-Petersen.

A number of runestones in Sweden contain the personal name Kylfingr, which may or may not be connected to the Kylfings as a group.

=== Other suggestions ===
A few historians have hypothesized that the Kylfings were a West Slavic people related to the Pomeranians. Under this interpretation, the Slavic term Kolbiag may share common origins with such place-names as Kołobrzeg (formerly Kolberg), a town on the Pomeranian Baltic coast, and Kolpino, a settlement near modern St. Petersburg.

== Status ==
=== Byzantine Empire ===
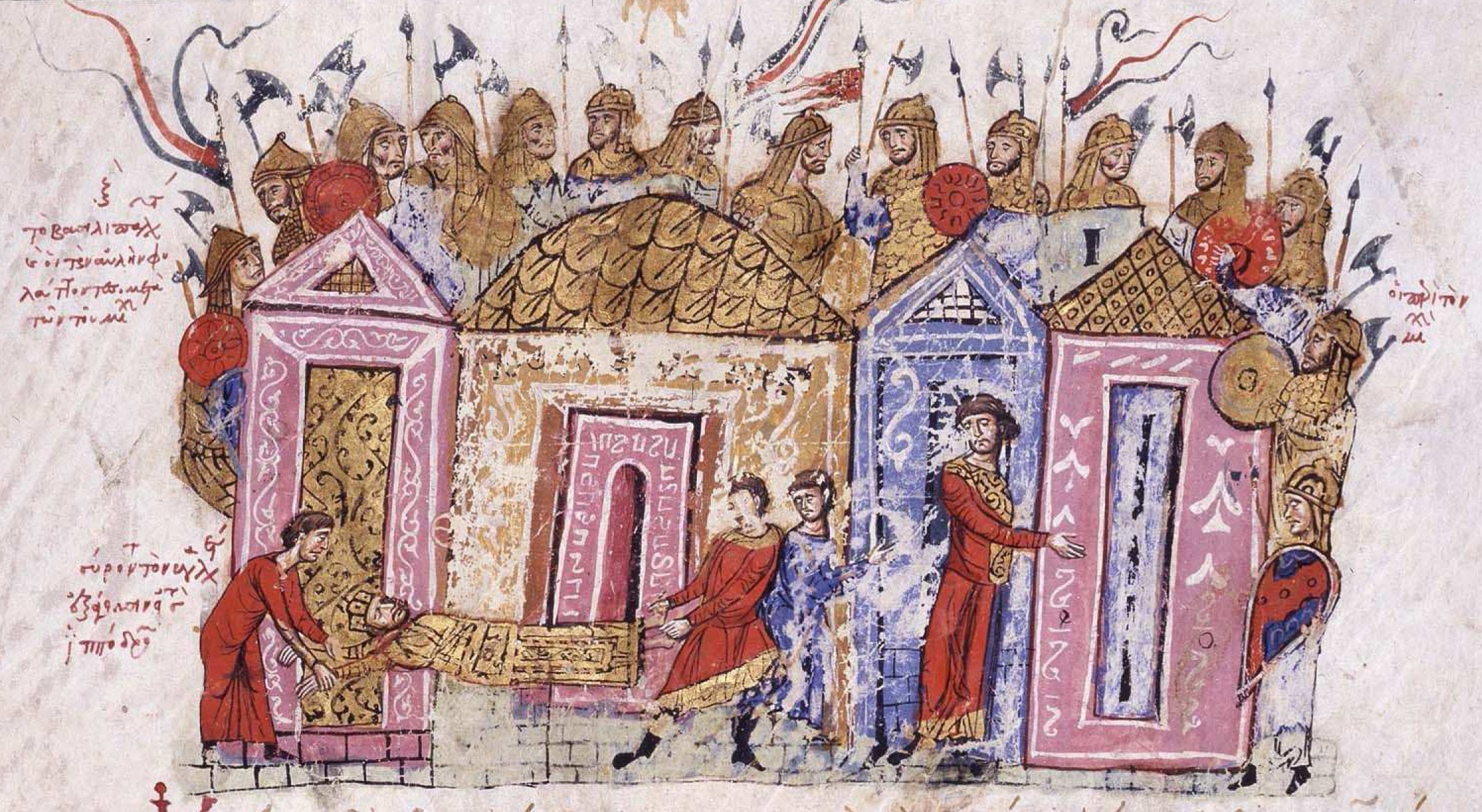
Varangian Guardsmen, an illumination from the 11th century chronicle of John Skylitzes

Eleventh-century Byzantine sources refer to Kylfings (Κουλπίγγοι, Koulpingoi; often attested in the genitive plural Κουλπίγγων, Koulpingon) as being among the foreigners serving as mercenaries in Constantinople, but appear to distinguish between them and the Varangians. For instance, an imperial chrysobull, an edict bearing a golden seal, issued in 1073 exempts certain monasteries from being forced to billet soldiers of specific ethne: Varangians, Rus', Saracens, Franks and Koulpingoi. In previous edicts issued in 1060 and 1068 the Koulpingoi had not been separately delineated. Similar edicts were issued in 1082, 1086, and 1088. The edict issued by Alexios I Komnenos 1088, for instance, reads:

The whole of the above-mentioned island [of Patmos], as well as the monastery with all its properties, is granted exkousseia [exemption] from the billetting [mitata] of all commanders, both Rhomaioi and foreign allies, that is the Rus, Varangians, Koulpingoi, Inglinoi, Frangoi, Nemitsoi, Bulgarians, Saracens, Alans, Abasgoi, the Immortals, and all other Romans and foreigners.

=== Russia and the eastern Baltic ===
The Kylfings were also active in the eastern Baltic and northern Russia. Kylfingaland may have been used to refer to Karelia; on some runestones it has been interpreted as a synonym for Garðariki, the Old Norse name for Russia. The eleventh-century Ruskaya Pravda, the law code of the Kievan Rus', grants certain privileges to Kylfings (Колбяги or "Kolbiagi") in addition to Varangians ("Varyagi"). For instance, Varangians and Kylfings were entitled to press charges with an oath without relying on any witnesses. In addition, in order to swear innocence, they needed only two witnesses, whereas a native Slav needed as many as seven. Moreover, the Varangians and the Kylfings were entitled to give shelter to a fugitive for as many as three days, whereas Slavs and others had to hand him over directly.

=== Hungary ===
A military organization called Kölpények is reported to have existed in Medieval Hungary during the tenth, eleventh and twelfth centuries. Hungarian scholars have proposed that the Kölpények were identical with the Kylfings/Kolbiagi. Hungarian sources regard the Kölpények as being of Scandinavian origin. They were hired by the early rulers of the House of Arpad, particularly Taksony of Hungary in the 950s, to serve as frontier guards. They fought with their Magyar employers alongside Sviatoslav I of Kiev against Bulgaria and the Byzantine Empire. Alternatively, the Kölpények may have been of Pecheneg origin, as there was a Pecheneg tribal group called Külbej during roughly the same period.

== Austkylfur ==
Norway ca. 872 CE (with Harald's kingdom shown in red) before the defining Battle of Hafrsfjord

The skaldic poet Thorbjorn Hornklofi wrote about Austkylfur, or "East-Kylfings", in his epic poem Haraldskvæði. In some manuscripts the name was, probably erroneously, rendered auðkylfur or "rich men". Some philologists, using the nautical meaning of the word kylfa, interpret the phrase as "eastern ships". Others, such as F. Jonsson, interpreted Austkylfur to mean "eastern logs", while Vigfusson believed that the phrase properly meant simply "men of the east". Another interpretation of the term used in Haraldskvæði is the derogatory "eastern oafs".

Guðmundsson specifically identified the Austkylfur of Hornklofi's poem with the Kylfings mentioned elsewhere in Scandinavian and Eastern European sources, and interpreted the phrase Austkylfur to mean "eastern club-wielding men".

In Haraldskvæði as recorded by Snorri Sturluson in the Heimskringla, the Austrkylfur were described as being opponents of Harald Fairhair at the Battle of Hafrsfjord. As such they formed part of the force, led by Kjotve the Rich of Agder and the kings and jarls of Hordaland, Rogaland, and Telemark, that came to Hafrsfjord to fight Harald's encroaching hegemony. The exact relationship between the Austkylfur and the anti-Harald coalition is unknown. Nora Chadwick identifies the Austkylfur as the part of the force opposing Harald that came from Agder and Telemark. These districts lie further east than the other kingdoms opposing Harald's rule. After their defeat by Harald and his army, the Kylfings' property was plundered and their womenfolk, described as "eastern maidens", were distributed by the victorious king among his warriors.

== Timeline ==
Date	Work mentioned	Details
c. 880s	Thorbjorn Hornklofi's Haraldskvæði, composed c. 900 (as preserved in the 13th-century Heimskringla)	The "Austkylfur" participate in the Battle of Hafrsfjord between Harald Fairhair, King of Norway, and a coalition led by King Kjotve of Agder; their women are divided as spoils of war among Harald's warriors.
c. 900	Egil's Saga (13th century)	Thorolf Kveldulfsson defeated a large force of Kylfing marauders in northern Norway around this time.
c. 950	Gesta Hungarorum, written 1100-1200	Prince Taksony of Hungary hires mercenaries called Kölpények, probably identical with the Kylfings.
970–972	Gesta Hungarorum	Kölpények mercenaries serve in the Magyar army in support of Sviatoslav I of Kiev's Bulgar campaign.
c. 1000	Runestones Sö 318, U 320, U 419, U 445	Swedish runestones are erected bearing the personal name "Kylfingr".
1010s	Russkaya Pravda, law code of the Kievan Rus'	Start of codification of Russkaya Pravda, which grants special rights and privileges to the Kolbiagi.
1070s–1080s	Byzantine chrysobulls	Koulpingoi are mentioned among other nations with contingents in the Byzantine army.
c.1100	Gesta Hungarorum	Kölpények mercenaries still active in Hungary.
c.1150	Landfræði, a geographical text by Icelander Nikolas Bergsson	Russia is referred to as Kylfingaland.
c.1400	Bjarkarimur, a poem based in part on the lost Skjoldunga Saga	Mention is made of a berserkr from the "Land of the Kylfings."
