= Steve Bolstad =

American politician

Member of the Montana House of Representatives from the 24th district
- In office 2007 -2008

Personal details
- Born: February 13, 1966 (age 60) Great Falls, Montana
- Party: Democratic Party
- Spouse: Laura
- Education: Montana State University, University of Montana School of Law
- Profession: Attorney

Steve Bolstad is a politician who was a Democratic Party member of the Montana House of Representatives. He represented District 24 from 2007 to 2008.
