= Bolstad =

Bolstad is a surname. Notable people with the surname include:

- Bjørn Bolstad Skjelbred (born 1970), composer, arranger, improviser and teacher
- David Bolstad (1969–2011), New Zealand representative woodchopper
- Eivind Nævdal-Bolstad (born 1987), Norwegian politician for the Conservative Party
- Øivind Bolstad (1905–1979), Norwegian playwright and novelist
- Steve Bolstad (born 1966), Democratic Party member of the Montana House of Representatives
- Torleiv Bolstad (1915–1979), Norwegian musician and Hardanger fiddle player

== See also ==
- Les Bolstad Golf Course, golf course owned by the University of Minnesota
