= Borg á Mýrum =

Human settlement in Iceland

Coordinates: 64.5615°N 21.9154°W

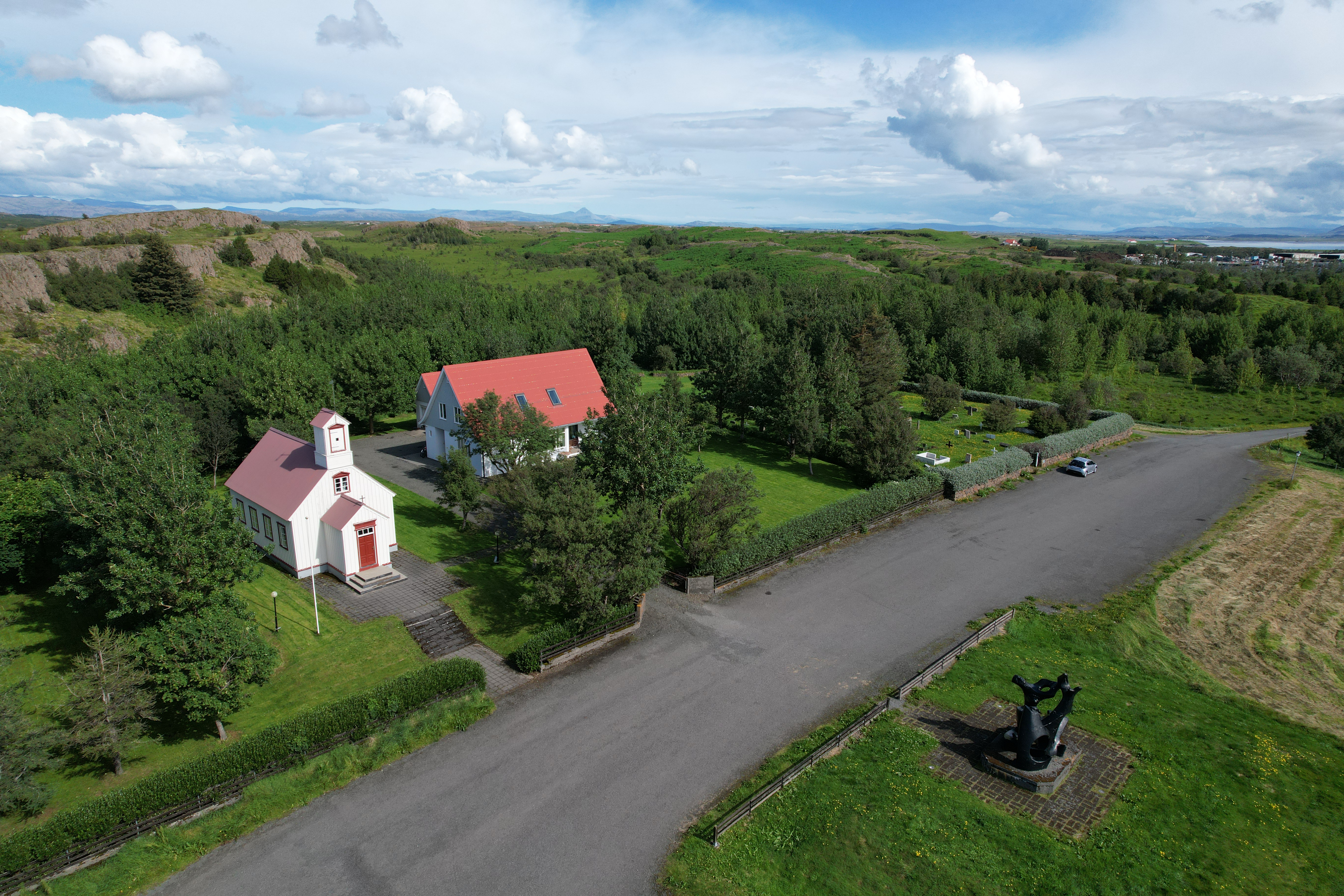
Borg á Mýrum

Borg (Icelandic pronunciation: [ˈpɔrk]) (often referred to as Borg á Mýrum) is a settlement due west of Borgarnes township in Iceland. Its recorded history reaches back to the settlement of Iceland. One of the country's original settlers was Skallagrímur Kveldúlfsson (Skalla-Grímr), who claimed the area around Borg as his land, built a farm and made his home there. His son Egill Skallagrímsson then continued to live and farm at Borg á Mýrum.

Borg á Mýrum was visited in 1897 by a British antiquary, William Gershom Collingwood (1854-1932),(see note^{1}) who found 'the historical homestead, still partly built of oak-beams carved and moulded in the ancient times'. This building has not survived. However, there is a twentieth-century monument to Egill by Icelandic sculptor Ásmundur Sveinsson (1893–1982). The abstract sculpture represents him as he grieves for two of his sons, Gunnar and Böðvarr, and seeks solace in the skaldic poem Sonatorrek.

== Church ==
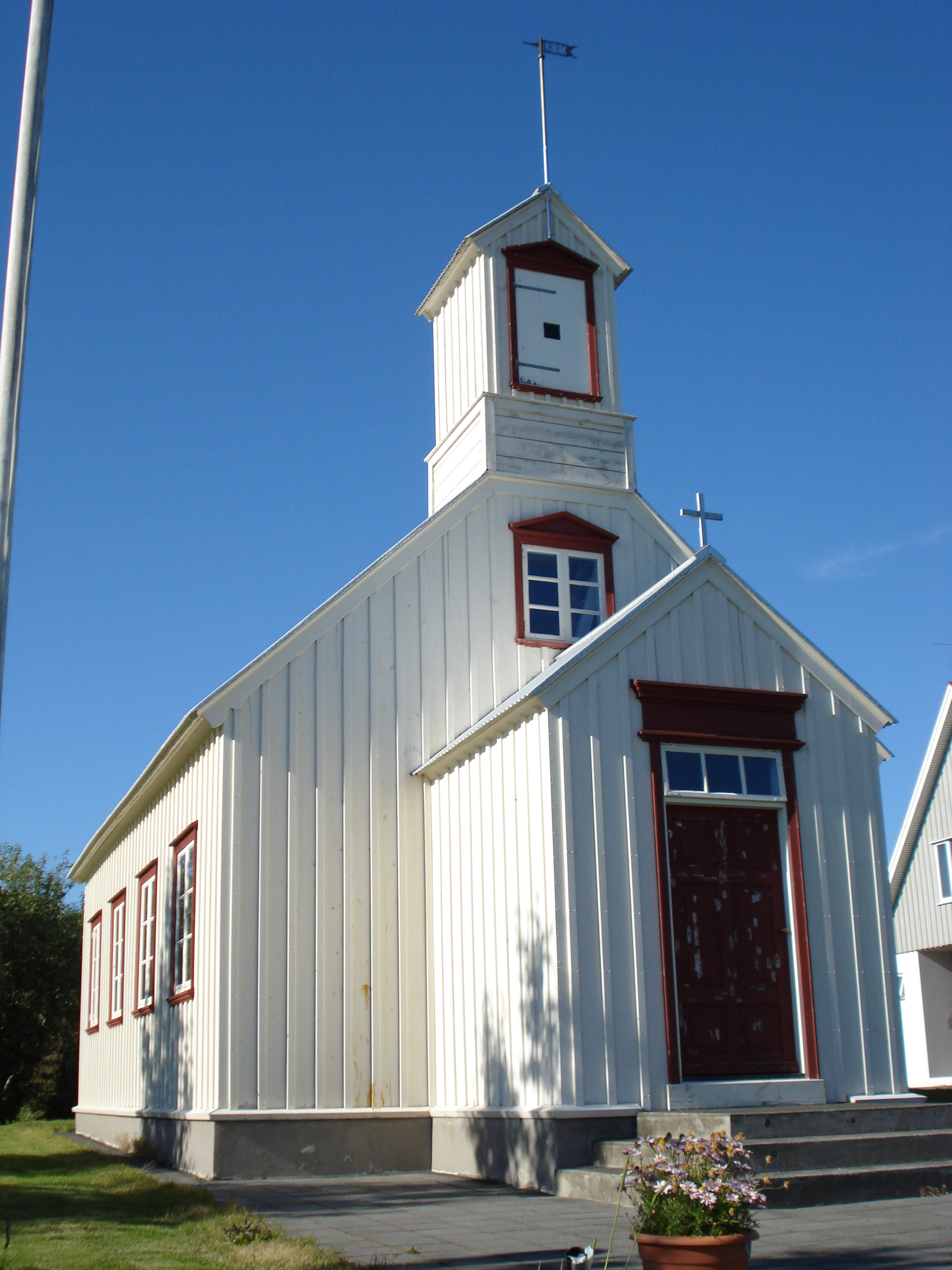
Borg á Mýrum Church, Borgarnes, Iceland.

Borg á Mýrum has had a church ever since Iceland was Christianised around the year 1000, shortly after Egill's death. The present Borg á Mýrum Church (Borgarkirkja) was built in 1880, and is notable for its geographical alignment: it faces north–south, which is not traditional for Icelandic churches. It is also unusual in that the church building does not stand in the church yard, but is separated from it by the farm buildings. The altarpiece, depicting Christ blessing the little children, is unique in Iceland for being painted in Pre-Raphaelite style. The artist was Collingwood.

== See also ==
- Egil's Saga

== Notes ==
1. Collingwood was a gifted artist who became professor of Fine Arts at the University of Reading. He spent much of his life in the English Lake District where he developed his antiquarian interests and researched the Norse legacy in the area. He made an extensive trip around Iceland preparing an illustrated book "A Pilgrimage to the Saga-steads of Iceland" (published at Ulverston in 1899), which surveyed locations cited in the Icelandic Sagas.

== Other Sources ==
- Þorsteinn Jósepsson, Steindór Steindórsson og Páll Líndal (1982) Landið þitt Ísland (Örn og Örlygur)
- Björn Hróarsson (1994) Á ferð um landið, Borgarfjörður og Mýrar (Bókabúð Máls & menningar) ISBN 9979-3-0657-2
