= Thorolf Kveldulfsson =

9th-century Norwegian chieftain and Viking

Thorolf Kveldulfsson (Note: modern Icelandic: Þórólfur Kveld-Úlfsson) was the oldest son of Kveldulf Bjalfasson and brother of the Norwegian/Icelandic goði and skald Skalla-Grimr. His ancestor (great uncle) Hallbjorn was nicknamed "halftroll", possibly indicating Norwegian-Sami ancestry.

He served as a retainer of Harald I of Norway (Harald Fairhair). Thorolf is a hero of the early part of Egils saga.

== Life ==
=== Early life ===
Thorolf was the eldest son of Kveldulf and Salbjorg. Taking after his father in stature, he grew up tall and strong. His character, however, resembled that of his mother's side of the family, and he is described as being attractive, accomplished, friendly, energetic, and popular with everyone he meets. At age 20, he began raiding, taking out longboats during the summer with a band of men and his maternal uncles Olvir Hnufa (Hump) and Eyvind Lamb. He spent winters at home with his father, and summers conducting lucrative raids.

=== Service Under Harald-Fairhair ===
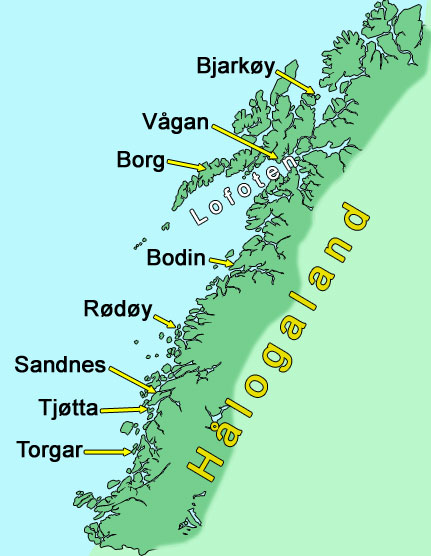
Halogaland. Torgar and Sandnes became Thorolf's estates.

Upon conquering Fjordane, Harald demanded the service of all landowners in the province. Against his better judgement and despite a premonition that Harald would not bring good fortune to his family, Kvedulf sent Thorolf to join Olvir in the King's service. Olvir had dropped out of viking raiding, and had become the king's court poet. As a retainer of Harald, he fought on the latter's own ship at the Battle of Hafrsfjord. After Harald's conquest of Norway Thorolf became his governor (lendmann or lendr maðr) over the northern region of Norway and was responsible for collecting tribute from the Sami to the north (finneskatt). In this capacity he took part in an expedition by King Faravid of Kvenland against the Karelians.

=== Inheritance and Quarrel with Harald-Fairhair ===
Thorolf inherited (and later lost) the estate of Torgar in Halogaland in the following manner.

Torgar had been the property of a widowed old landholder named Bjorgolf, who bestowed the management of the estate to his son, Brynjolf. But in his retirement, Bjorgolf obtained a new wife named Hildirid, a wealthy farmer's daughter, (Note: The farmer, Hogni of Leka, was in no position to refuse, and Bjorgolf paid an ounce of gold for the bride.) and begat two sons, Harek and Hraerek, who were now potential claimants to the land. They became known as Hildirid's sons (Hildiridarsons), and were about the same age as Brynjolf's son Bard (Bárðr inn hvíti, "the White"). The entire Torgar estate was inherited by Brynjolf, and he gave no share to Hildirid's sons; later on, the ownership of Torgar passed to Bard.

Bard was a distant kinsman of Thorolf (see the family tree on the right), and a comrade-at-arms as well. While Thorolf recovered from injuries sustained at Hafrsfjord, Bard was mortally wounded, and bequeathed the entire Torgar estate to Thorolf, entrusting the care of his wife and son to him. Thorolf married Bard's widow Sigrid (Sigríðr Sigurðardóttir), and this put him in line to inherit another estate, at Sandnes, through his wife. When Thorolf obtained Sandnes after the death of his father-in-law, Hildirid’s sons arrived and demanded their share from the Torgar estate. Thorolf rebuffed the claim since Bard had informed him they were bastard children. Hildirid’s sons said they could prove their legitimacy by producing witnesses their father paid a bride price, but Thorolf refused to recognize their birthright, as it was rumored that Hildirid was taken by force.

Hildirid’s sons became sycophants of the king and began to slander Thorolf’s loyalty to the king. They accused Thorolf of embezzlement from the tribute, (Note: Thorolf was also trading with the Kven people and looting from the Karelians, acquiring large supplies of furs and other goods in his own right (Chapter 14).) and even an assassination attempt. (Note: Thorolf committed the faux pas of inviting the king to a banquet where his men outnumbered the king's retinue, which Harald took offense to. The gathering was so large the banquet had to be held in a barn (Chapters 11, 12).)

The king eventually seized Thorolf’s Torgar estate and tribute-collecting duties, granting these to Hildirid’s sons. The brothers did not do as good a job at collecting and blamed Thorolf for obstruction. Thorolf still lived comfortably off his Sandnes estate and kept a large retinue, and trading as well.

Tensions escalated. The king's kinsmen named Sigtrygg Travel-quick and Hallvard Travel-hard (Sigtryggr Snarfari, Hallvarðr harðfari) seized Thorolf's trade ship that was headed for England. Thorolf traveled to the Vík area and retaliated, seizing a ship filled with provisions for the king in Thruma, then pillaging Sigtrygg and Hallvard's farm in Hising, (Note: An island of on the mouth of the Gota River, part of modern-day Sweden.) causing maiming and death to their two younger brothers. For the offense, the king issued permission to kill Thorolf.

Ultimately, fearful of Thorolf's growing power, King Harald himself gathered troops and assaulted Thorolf's hall at Sandnes, in a minor masterpiece of amphibious warfare. After Thorolf refused to surrender, King Harald set the hall on fire. When the men ran out they were immediately under fire, however, they quickly rushed to form a strong shield wall, while Thorolf was running to the men he was killed by Harald, causing him to fall at Harald's feet. Shortly after this, minor fighting took place and the men of Sandnes surrendered to Harald., King.

=== Retaliation for Death ===
Thorolf's maternal uncles Olvir Hnufa and Eyvind Lamb bade the king leave of service, but this was not to be granted. The king arranged for Eyvind to take custody of Sandnes and to marry the twice-widowed Sigrid, and these two were reconciled.

Skalla-Grimr went with Olvir Hnufa to King Harald and demanded compensation for Thorolf's murder, which resulted in his being chased out of the king's court. Together with his father Kveldulf and their kinsman Ketil Trout, Skalla-Grimr took revenge by killing those of Harald's servants who took part in Thorolf's killing before fleeing to Iceland.
