= Skalla-Grímr =

Viking Age Norwegian explorer and skald

Grímr Kveldúlfsson
- Born: Grímr Kveldúlfsson; 863; Norway
- Died: 946; Borg, Iceland
- Occupations: Explorer, Skald, Hird
- Spouse: Bera Yngvarsdóttir
- Children: Egil Skallagrímsson, Thorolf Skallagrímsson
- Parent(s): Kveldulf Bjalfason, Salbjorg Karadottir
- Writing career
- Language: Old Norse
- Period: Viking Age
- Movement: Skaldic Poetry

Grímr Kveldúlfsson, (Note: Old Norse: Grímr Kveldúlfsson [ˈɡriːmz̠ ˈkweldˌuːlvsˌson]; Modern Icelandic: Grímur Kveldúlfsson [ˈkriːmʏr ˈkʰvɛltˌul(f)sˌsɔːn]; Modern Norwegian: Grim Kveldulvsson) usually called Skalla-Grímr, (Note: Old Norse: Skalla-Grímr [ˈskɑlːɑ-ˌɡriːmz̠], "bald Grim"; Modern Icelandic: Skalla-Grímur [ˈskatla-ˌkriːmʏr̥]; Modern Norwegian: Skallagrim) was a Norwegian who lived in the ninth and tenth centuries. He is an important character in Egils saga and is mentioned in the Landnámabók.

== Biography ==
=== Family ===
Skalla-Grímr was the son of Kveldúlfr Bjálfason and Salbjörg Káradóttir. He had one brother, Þorolfr, and was related to Ketil Trout on his father's side and Eyvind Lambi on his mother's. He was married to Bera Yngvarsdóttir and had two sons, Þorolfr and Egill, and two daughters, Sæunn and Þórunn. His ancestor, Hallbjorn, was Norwegian-Sami.

=== Feud with King Harald ===
Skalla-Grímr's brother Þorolfr was a member of King Haraldr Fairhair's retinue, although Kveldúlfr refused to swear allegiance to the king. When Haraldr had Þorolfr killed, Skalla-Grímr and Kveldulfr attacked a ship, this belonging to the brothers Sigtryggr and Hallvarðr, these brothers had been the cause of Haraldr's distrust with Þorolfr, spreading lies and rumors to convince their king to let them take Þorolfr's land. Skalla-Grimr knew of this and saw their ship flying their banner not far from the coast. Skalla-Grimr took the chance and set out for the brothers with his father and other warriors, and killed all but two of those on the ship, including two of the King's cousins.

=== Settlement in Iceland ===
Following these killings, Skalla-Grímr and Kveldúlfr set out for Iceland. Kveldúlfr fell sick due to his berserkr rage in the former battle as his body was becoming too old to fight. He died early in the voyage, however, before he died, he commanded his ship's captain (there were two ships; Skalla-Grimr was not on this one) to throw overboard his casket, and wherever it may come to the shore is where the ships will settle. The ship captain did as Kvedulfr directed, and when he arrived in Iceland, he discovered the casket had come ashore in the Mýrar district, near Borg. When they arrived at Iceland they found Skalla-Grimr and told him of his father's death, and of his wish. Skalla-Grímr and the settlers built his house at Borg, and settled the entire region.

Skalla-Grímr lived to an old age and died at Borg.

== Poetry ==
Skalla-Grímr was a prolific poet, and composed this stanza:

Nú's hersis hefnd
við hilmi efnd;
gengr ulfr ok örn
of ynglings börn.
Flugu höggvin hræ
Hallvarðs á sæ.
Grár slítr undir
ari Snarfara.

Now the nobleman (Kveldúlfr) has exacted revenge upon the king (Harald Fairhair);
now wolf and eagle tread on the king's children.
The hewn corpses of Hallvarðr (Hallvarðr Harðfari and his people, that is the enemies) flew into the sea;
the grey eagle tears the wounds of Snarfari (Sigtryggr Snarfari was the brother of Hallvarðr Harðfari).

According to the late scholar Bjarni Einarsson this poem, by using end rhyme, "if authentic" is a unique phenomenon in late ninth-century Old Norse poetry.
