= Kven Sea =

Mythical body of water in northern Europe

The Kven Sea (Cwen sea) is mentioned as the northern border for the ancient Germania in The Old English Orosius, the history of the world published in England in 890 CE with a commission from King Alfred the Great himself.

The name Kven sea was probably the same as the Gulf of Finland, although the Gulf of Bothnia has also been suggested. But, in a norwegian source from 1922 "Kvænhavet" (Kven sea) is mentioned as another name (nickname) for the White Sea.

Included in Orosius, there is a short mention of the Kven Sea by a Norwegian Viking Ottar, but the Kven Sea is unknown outside Orosius.

Borders of the ancient Germania were described in Orosius as follows:

"From the Tanais (River Don) westwards to the Rhine, which takes its rise in the Alps, and runs northward, till it falls into that branch of the ocean which surrounds Bryttannia, and southward from the Tanais to the Donua or Danube, whose source is near that of the Rhine, and which runs to the northward of Greece, till it empties itself into the Euxine, and north even to that part of the ocean which is called the Kven Sea (Cwen sea), there are many nations; and the whole of this extensive country is called Germania."

== In other sources ==
The total absence of the name "Kven Sea" from all Norwegian and Swedish sources is noteworthy, however, and sagas that describe the era during which Ottar lived use the name "Helsingjabotn" for the Gulf of Bothnia, for example in the Orkneyinga saga. If Kven Sea was a name used for the Gulf of Bothnia, it along with all of its possible variations seem to be completely missing from the Scandinavian namespace in later times. Finnish historian Kyösti Julku has, however, suggested that "Kajano More", which appears in Russian documents from the 14th to 16th centuries in different spellings as the name for the Gulf of Bothnia, might have been an equivalent of Kven Sea. But that theory does not explain its total absence in Scandinavian sources.
