= Hallbjorn Halftroll =

Hallbjorn Halftroll or Hallbjorn Ulfsson was an early ninth century Norwegian hersir. He was the father of Ketil Trout of Hrafnista. He is mentioned in the Ketils saga hœngs as well as Egils saga and the Landnámabók. He was likely Norwegian-Sami.
