= Hersir =

Title

A hersir was a local Viking military commander of a hundred (a county subdivision), of about 100 men, and owed allegiance to a jarl or king. They were also aspiring landowners, and, like the middle class in many feudal societies, supported the kings in their centralization of power. Originally, the term Hersir referred to a wealthy farmer who owned land and had the status of a leader. Throughout the Viking Age, Hersir was eventually redefined as someone who organized and led raids. In the 10th century, the influence of Hersirs began to decrease due to the development of effective national monarchies in Scandinavia. Hersir was again redefined later on to mean a local leader or representative. The independence of the Hersir as a military leader eventually vanished, to be replaced only by the title of a royal representative. The "Hávamál", which was the mythical advice of the supreme creator Odin to humankind, contains a number of verses emphasizing the virtue of cautious consideration and strategical attack. This theme, in its oral form, was one of the major influences on the mind of the Viking Hersir.

== Equipment ==
The main weapon of the Hersirs was the Viking sword. This sword is clearly distinguished by its “Type H” hilt. It was the most prominent type of hilt during the Viking Age. The material of the hilt ranged, depending on the wealth of the owner, from polished steel and with decorative wire inlays of silver, copper, and/or tin. The pommel and upper guard of the sword are formed in two separate parts, then bolted together with a twisted sterling silver wire between the pommel and upper guard. The blade is classified as a Geibig Type 3, which is defined by a moderate taper in width and a fuller taper in width towards the point. The type can be dated to the period between second half of the 8th century to the second half of the 10th century. The sword is designed to symbolize power and authority, as well as cool level-headedness.

For long-distance travel, men would often be on horseback. For overseas journeys, Viking longboats were capable of transporting thirty people to their destination, which would even include the reaches of inner Russia.

Hersirs were always equipped with a shield, which was normally wooden and that accompanied the sword.

== Dress ==
Armour was often used as means of displaying wealth as much as functional battle purposes. The hersir was often equipped with a rounded or conical helmet and a short mail coat. The type of helmet, sword, and ringmail corselet worn by the Viking, demonstrated the wealth of the warrior. Armour finds from this period are rare. Perhaps the most famous example is the mail coat and helmet found at Gjermundbu. Hersirs are typically thought to be very well groomed.

Shoes and boots were typically made from cattle, seals, or reindeer. Hersirs usually wore more elegant boots than that of the ordinary military personnel. There are two main types of Viking shoe. The first and most common is by thonging around the top of the shoe. This can be seen in the Jorvik II ankle boot. The Jorvik I type is closed by a flap crossing over and closing with a button. The Hedeby shoe is an early type of turn shoe. This is the least common type found, but could be less costly, but less protective. Any of these types of shoes may have been worn by the Hersir.

Baggy trousers made out of linen or woven wool that were either mid-calf or just below the knee were the typically worn. Tight fitting trousers became the popular style during the late 10th century. Tunics were usually knee length and gathered at the waist with a belt. The sleeves of the tunic were to the wrist or longer. From the elbow to the shoulder, the sleeve was tight fitting. The overtunic would be constructed along the same pattern as the undertunic and made of wool. A richer Hersir would have had a tunic dyed in a bright color with tablet woven strips around the neck and cuffs. There is some evidence the undertunic would be longer than the overtunic, showing a contrasting color at the sleeves and hem.

== Military tactics ==
Vikings were very skilled sailors. Sailing instructions passed down from generation to generation paired with the advancements in technology allowed for the Vikings to dominate the waters. A common military tactic first used in 866, was the transfer from boat to land by the use of captured horses. Despite the fact that Vikings often used horses, they were not cavalry men primarily due to the low number of horses in Scandinavia. Horses were often used for overland routes but the Vikings always fought on foot. Ordinarily, they would align themselves in a shield wall formation with the Hersir at the front and archers and slingers in the back. In the shield wall, the Vikings would stand close together in order to overlap their shields, thus creating a wall out of shields. Another formation that was also used, called the Svinfylking, was a variation to the shield wall but with several wedge-like formations pointing towards the enemy, creating a zig-zag pattern.

== Religious views ==
Hersirs' religious beliefs are somewhat unclear although they seemed to lie somewhere between Christianity and Paganism. Sometimes, Hersirs would be baptised, although it was most often not done for religious purposes. In many cases, Hersirs would be baptised in order to improve trade with the Christians or in obedience to a new king.

== Hersirs in history ==
Hersir was the name of a man in Rígsþula whose daughter Erna married Jarl, the first earl.

A Swedish hersir, Jarlabanke Ingefastsson, has become notable for the about 20 Jarlabanke Runestones that he raised together with his relatives.

Ketill Flatnose was a Norwegian hersir of the 9th century.

Aud the Deep-Minded (Ketilsdóttir) (Auður Djúpaúðga Ketilsdóttir) was the daughter of Ketill "Flatnose" Bjornsson.

In the Sagas of Icelanders there is mention of several hersirs, such as a powerful hersir in Sognefjord called Bjorn "Buna" Grimsson, who lived at Aurland and was the father of Ketill "Flatnose" Bjornsson. As related in Egil's Saga, he was a traveler, adventurer, and Viking raider.

Thorgerdur Eylaugsdottir (Þorgerður Eylaugsdóttir) was a female Hersir of Sogn. In Landnáma Björns lineage is traced to his foremothers rather than his forefathers. Only his father Grímur is mentioned in Bjorns lineage that continues to grandmother Hervör and great-grandmother Thorgerdur Eylaugsdóttir hersir. This is rare in the stories of the Icelanders indicating the importance if Thorgerdur.
