= Egil's Saga =

Icelandic saga

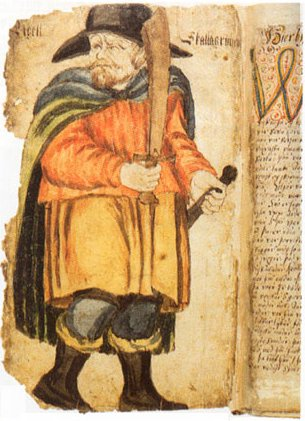
Egill Skallagrímsson in a 17th-century manuscript of Egill's Saga

Egill's Saga or Egil's saga (Old Norse: Egils saga [ˈeɣels ˈsɑɣɑ]; Icelandic pronunciation: [ˈeijɪls ˈsaːɣa]) is an Icelandic saga (family saga) on the lives of the clan of Egill Skallagrímsson (Anglicised as Egill Skallagrimsson), an Icelandic farmer, viking and skald. The saga spans the years c. 850–1000 and traces the family's history from Egill's grandfather to his offspring.

Its oldest manuscript (a fragment) dates back to c. 1250 AD. The saga comprises the sole source of information on the exploits of Egill, whose life is not historically recorded. Stylistic and other similarities between Egill's Saga and Heimskringla have led many scholars to believe that they were the work of the same author, Snorri Sturluson. The work is generally referred to as Egla [ˈɛkla] by Icelandic scholars. (Note: See, for example, E. R. Eddison to Jón Stefánsson 7 March 1927 (Reykjavík, National Library of Iceland, Lbs 3426 4to):'I am two-thirds of the way through my translation of Egla, and my mind is much occupied (in such leisure moments as I have) with that magnificent classic'.)

== Synopsis ==
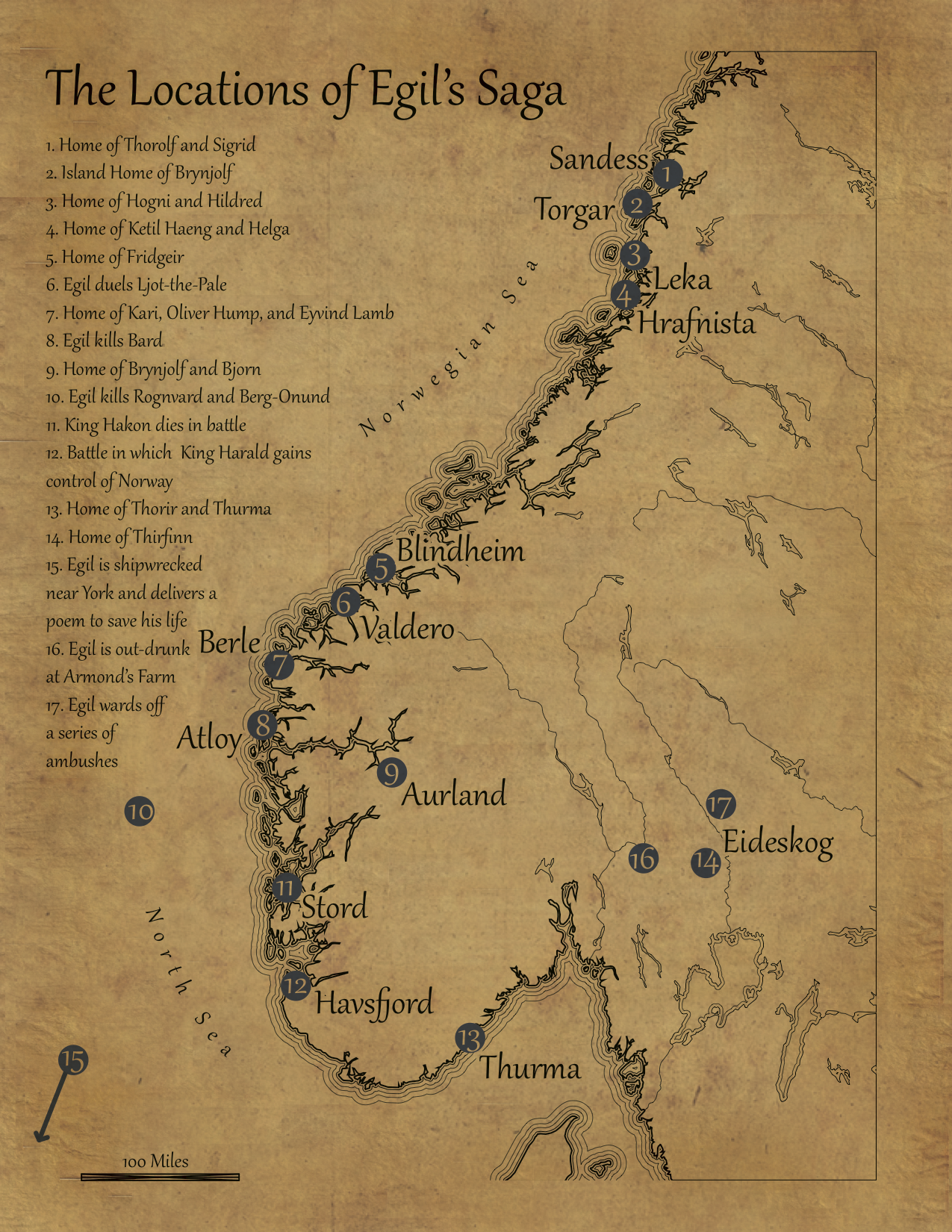
A reference map of Egill's Saga (Norway)

The saga begins in Norway around 850, with the life of Egill's grandfather Ulf (Úlfr) aka Kveldulf or "Evening Wolf", and his two sons Thorolf (Þórólfr) and Skallagrim (Skalla-Grímr). Strife with the royal house drive the family out of the country, and they settle in Iceland. The brothers Egill and Thorolf Skallagrimsson are born. They have a tenuous tenure in Norway, but Egill is outlawed and they roam Scandinavia and serve the king of England. Egill tries to reclaim property back in Norway (as his wife's inheritance), but this is blocked, and Egill develops a personal vendetta against the King.

There are also vivid descriptions of his other fights and friendships, his relationship with his family (highlighted by his jealousy, as well as fondness for his older brother Thorolf), his old age, and the fate of his own son Thorstein (Þorsteinn, who was baptized once Roman Catholicism came to Iceland) and his children, who had many children of their own. The saga ends around the year 1000 and spans many generations.

=== Kveldulf's lineage ===
Ulf (Kveldulf) had Hallbjorn Halftroll as his maternal uncle, and was known for his surpassing size and strength. He had accrued land and property from viking raids, and was a man of wisdom. He earned the nickname Kveldulf (Kveldúlfr, "Evening Wolf") because of his erratic temper at nightfall, and reputation for manifesting the so-called "shape-shifter" (hamrammr) abilities, explained in later chapters to be comparable (or equatable) with berserk fury. (Note: The term hamrammr is translated as "animal character", and its substantive form hamremi as "frenzy" (chapter 27).) Extreme personal traits like these are manifested by his son Skallagrim (Note: It has been noted Skallagrim assumed the "shape-shifter's fury" when he nearly killed Egil. This event occurred in chapter 41, when he has already killed Egil's friend Thord (Þórðr Granason). Kveldulf manifested amazing strength, but nothing is stated about a change in appearance.) and his grandson Egill as well.

=== Strife with Harald Fairhair of Norway ===
King Harald Fairhair (Haraldr Hárfagri) was warring to unite all of Norway. Kveldulf refused to assist the local king of Fjordane, but rebuffed Harald's overtures as well, incurring his wrath. A compromise was mediated by Olvir Hnufa (Ölvir hnúfa or "Olvir Hump"), Kveldulf's brother-in-law (Note: Olvir was the son of Kveldulf's close friend Kari (Kari from Berle, a berserk). Kveldulf married Kari's daughter Salbjorg.) and Harald's court poet: Kveldulf was to send his elder son Thorolf, as soon as he returned from viking expedition. Thorolf served the king well, but suspicion fell on him due to his becoming overly successful, exacerbated by words of slanderers. Thorolf was killed by the king who led a band of warriors, and the rift would force Skallagrim and his father Kveldulf to flee Norway to settle in Iceland.

Skallagrim journeyed to Harald's court seeking compensation for the death of his brother Thorolf, but offended the king and had to make a hasty exit empty-handed. Skallagrim and Kveldulf then recaptured a boat that had been seized from Thorolf, and after killing everyone on board, sent a taunting poem to the King. In the battle, Kveldulf displayed his "frenzy" (hamrammr or hamremi), which left him severely weakened. When the family emigrated to Iceland, Kveldulf did not survive the trip, and his coffin was set adrift. Near the spot where the coffin washed ashore in Iceland, Skallagrim established his settlement, which he named Borg. He took up a peaceful livelihood as a farmer and blacksmith, and raised his sons, Thorolf (named Þórólfr after his slain brother), and Egill (the titular hero).

=== Skallagrim's sons ===
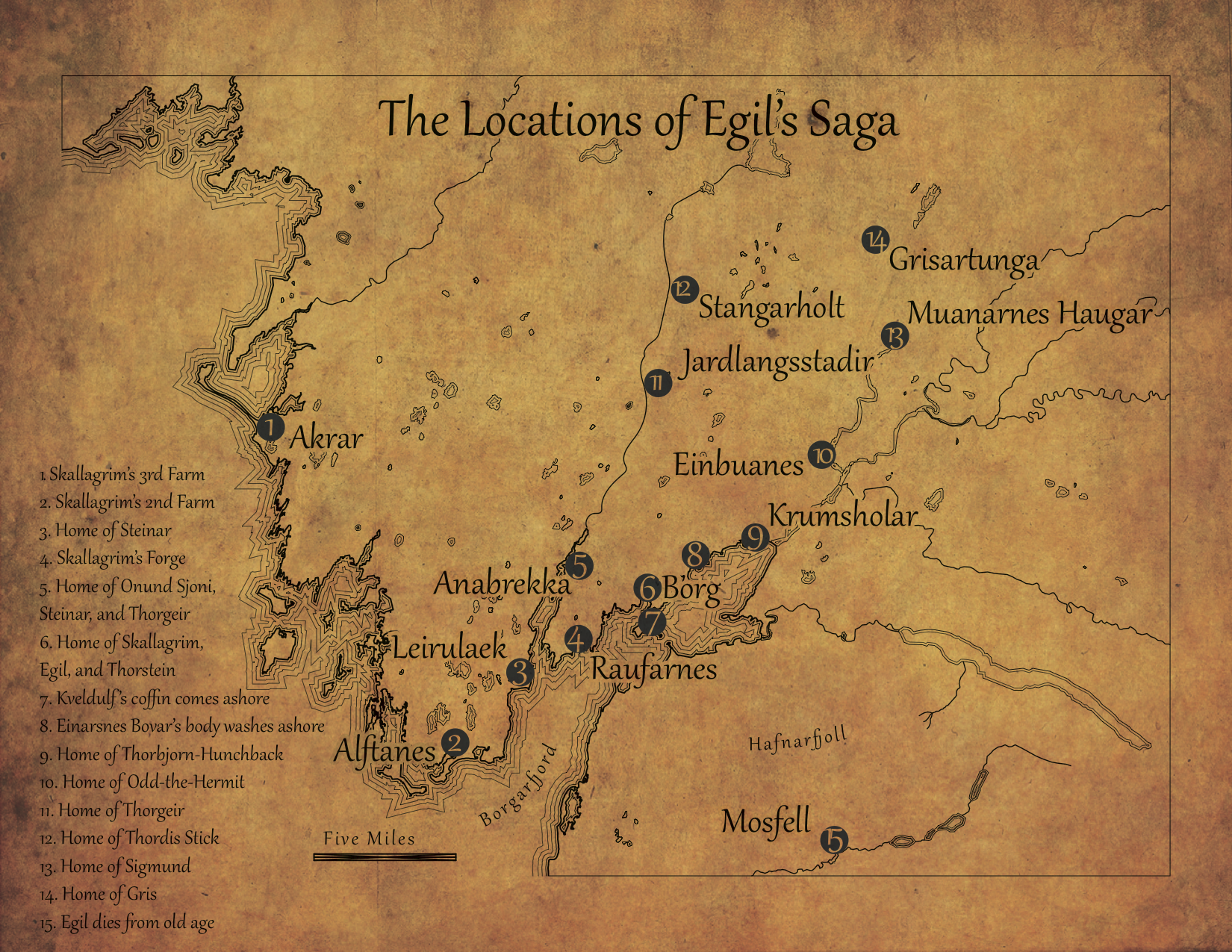
A reference map of Egill's Saga zoomed in on Western Iceland (Borgarfjord)

The saga then proceeds to describe the lives of Thorolf and Egill Skallagrimsson, born in Iceland, and eventually making their way to Norway in adulthood. Thorolf visited Skallagrim's old friend in Norway, Thorir the Hersir (Þórir Hróaldsson). (Note: In fact, Thorir was Skallagrim's foster-brother.) Here Thorolf befriended Prince Eirik Bloodaxe, Harald's favorite son and Thorir's fosterling. He approached the prince with a gift of a painted warship that Eirik was admiring, on advice of Bjorn (Björn Brynjólfsson), Thorir's brother-in-law. (Note: Bjorn had carried off Thorir's sister, and obtained consent for marriage after the fact. In the meanwhile, Bjorn had to flee, and was indebted to the hospitality of Thorolf's family in Iceland.) (Note: Bjorn's daughter, fostered with Skallagrim in Iceland, later became Thorir's wife (and afterward Egil's).)

Afterwards Eirik Bloodaxe was crowned co-king, (Note: King over parts of Norway, Harald was not dead.) and as Thorolf headed home to Iceland, the king gave him a gold-inlaid ax as a gift to Skallagrim. Skallagrim abused the ax (named "King's Gift" or konungsnautr) and shattered it, reciting an insulting poem about it to Thorolf and handing back what was left of the axe, a sooty handle with a rusted blade. Thorolf flung the axe overboard, but reported to King Eirik that his father was grateful for the axe, presenting a bolt of longship sail cloth pretended to be from Skallagrim. In this way Thorolf managed to somewhat keep the peace between Skallagrim and King Eirik Bloodaxe.

Egill's boyhood foreshadowed his future rebelliousness and poetic prowess. At the age of three, his unbridled behavior when drunk and strength beyond his age earned him a stay at home, ordered by his father, when a feast was held by Yngvar (Egill's maternal grandfather). Egill defiantly rode a horse to attend, following his father and company from afar, and composed his first skaldic verse. At the age of seven while playing in the ball games (knattleikr), he committed his first murder (axe-killing an older boy who outclassed him in the sport). (Note: Egil proved a sore loser and struck with his bat the boy who was named Grim (Grímr). Grim shoved him to the ground, and after consulting his friend Thord (Þórðr Granason), Egil took revenge by driving an axe through Grim's head.) By the time Egill was twelve very few grown men could compete with him in games, but when he and his friend (Note: Thord (Þórðr Granason)) challenged his father one day, Skallagrim manifested such strength at nightfall that he slammed the friend dead against the ground. Egill's life was only saved when Egill's fostra (a female slave that had acted as Egill's nurse as a child) tried to calm Skallagrim down and was killed instead. Egill got so upset that he killed one of his father's favorite slaves in return, and as a result the two were not on speaking terms for the following winter.

=== Conflict with Eirik Bloodaxe over ale ===
The summer after Egill's father killed his friend, Thorolf came home to visit Iceland. Egill forcibly insisted on accompanying Thorolf back to Norway, although Thorolf was reluctant. On this trip, Thorolf took his prospective wife, Asgerd (Ásgerðr Bjarnardóttir), who had been reared in Iceland, to ask her father Bjorn and uncle Thorir for permission to marry. While staying with Thorir, Egill became attached to Thorir's son Arinbjorn (Arinbjörn Þórisson), an important figure in the saga and Egill's lifelong friend. (Note: Arinbjorn is to become mediator between Egil's family and the royal house, as Olvir had been in the previous generation.)

Egill missed the wedding on account of illness, (Note: Sayers observes Egil must have faked an illness to skip the wedding, since he was already in love with Asgerd.) and joined Thorir's men on an errand in Atloy, where he was slighted by the king's steward Bard (Bárðr), and wound up killing him. When Bard received Egill's party, he would only serve curd (skyr) to drink, pretending ale had run out. (Note: Actually Bard also served another beverage that was not ale, called afr. This is translated "whey" but in ancient times it meant an oat-brewed ale.) But later that night when king and queen arrived for the feast to the dísir, ale was served plentifully. Egill relentlessly jibed Bard about the deceit with sarcastic poetry, and his unquenchable thirst embarrassed the host. Bard and the queen sent Egill a poisoned drink, but the attempt was foiled by Egill, who inscribed runes on the horn and besmeared it with his own blood, causing the horn to shatter. Egill then went up to Bard and stabbed him to death with his sword. Discovering Egill had fled, Eirik ordered an unsuccessful manhunt to have Egill killed, and lost several men. Despite the affront, Eirik was persuaded by Thorir (his foster-father) to settle this by compensation.

=== Mercenary service in England, Thorolf falls in battle ===
While raiding near Frisia, Egill and Thorolf hear that King Æthelstan of England is in need of warriors. The brothers and their men sail to England to join the armies of the English king, are placed in charge of the Scandinavian contingent of Æthelstan's forces. The saga here displays contact with English historical tradition, correctly providing Æthelstan's lineage and offering only one of two instances of King Alfred being called 'the Great' outside of English sources. The battle that follows the brothers' arrival in England, named Vínheiðr in the text, is widely accepted as being the same as the Battle of Brunanburh, from which Æthelstan emerged victorious in 937. The saga identifies the primary antagonist at Vínheiðr as "Olaf the Red of Scotland", who appears to be a conflation of the Æthelstan's historical opponents, Constantine II of Scotland and Olaf Guthfrithson, a Hiberno-Norse Uí Ímair dynast. Egill and Thorolf are instrumental in Æthelstan's victory; however, Thorolf is killed on the second day of battle. In the aftermath of the conflict, Æthelstan gives Egill two chest of silver in compensation for Thorolf's death, intending that they be passed on to Skallagrim. Egill, however, keeps the silver for himself along with an arm-ring that the king passes him at sword-point at the victory feast. Egill stays at Æthelstan's court for the winter, during which time he composes a drápa in praise of the king. Æthelstan rewards Egill with yet two more gold arm-rings as well as an expensive cloak that the king himself had worn. At Egill's parting, Æthelstan expresses a wish that he would stay permanently in his service, an offer which Egill declines.

=== Inheritance case at the Gula-Thing ===
Egill married his brother Thorolf's widow, Asgerd. Some time later, Asgerd's father Bjorn the Wealthy died in Norway, but she received no inheritance, the entire estate having been claimed by Berg-Onund, married to Gunnhild Bjarnardottir (Asgerd's half-sister). Egill wanted to claim half-share for his wife, but the prospect was bleak because Berg-Onund was a favorite of Eirik and his consort Gunnhild. The case was argued at the Gulaþing assembly, where Berg-Onund asserted that Asgerd as a slave-woman entitled to no share (due to the circumstance that her mother eloped without her kinsmen's consent). Asbjorn countered with witnesses swearing that Asgerd was acknowledged as heiress, but the processing was blocked by Queen Gunnhild who ordered a henchmen to disrupt the assembly. Egill made threat against anyone who tried to make use of the disputed farm, and fled by ship. Eirik pursued with a fleet, and a skirmish ensued.

=== Eirik's power, cursed by Egill ===
Harald Fairhair dies, and Eirik becomes King of Norway, eliminating two of his brothers who were rivals to the crown. Eirik declares Egill an outlaw to be killed on sight, and Egill vows vengeance, especially against the manipulative queen. Egill's movements are under surveillance, and when he appears to leave the country, Berg-Onund dismissed the men he had gathered for protection and traveled not far from his home (Ask) to the king's farm at Aarstad. By chance, calm winds force Egill back to shore to the same location. Egill commits massacre, killing Onund, as well as Eirik's 10 year-old prince Rognvald. To top it off, Egill erects a scorn-pole (Nithing pole) with a horse head mounted on top, laying a curse that the nature spirits drive King Eirik and Queen Gunnhild away from Norway. The hoped-for outcome of the curse does become reality.

The saga makes note of the death of Skallagrim, Egill's father.

=== Head-Ransom ===
Eirik ruled just 1 year before being ousted as Norwegian king by his brother Hakon the fosterling of King Æthelstan in England. Eirik left Norway with his family, and eventually appointed king over Northumbria by Æthelstan of England. (Note: Eirik made alliance by marrying his daughter to Arnfinn, Earl of Orkney, and was raiding Scotland. Æthelstan mustered a host and then made this arrangement with Eirik) Two years later, Egill sailed to England intending to see Æthelstan and was captured by Eirik Bloodaxe. Eirik was furious, but Arinbjorn Thorisson convinced Eirik to spare Egill's life if he could compose a poem in his honor. Egill succeeded (by reciting Höfuðlausn or "Head Ransom"), and Eirik allowed him to leave on condition that he never appeared again before Eirik's sight. Egill made his way to see King Æthelstan, who was fostering Thorstein (Þorsteinn), a kinsman of Arinbjorn. While visiting, word arrived from Norway that Thorstein's father died leaving him a large inheritance. Þorsteinn, Arinbjorn and Egill made plans to sail to Norway to claim Thorsteinn's share. Before they leave, King Æthelstan convinced Egill to move to England and command his armies after their task is completed.

Egill returned to Iceland and spent a few years with his family. During this time, both Kings Æthelstan and Eirik Bloodaxe died, leaving Eirik's brother Hakon ruler of Norway. Egill returned to Norway to claim lands won in a duel with Atli the Short on behalf of his wife Asgerd. Along the way Egill stayed with Arinbjorn, whom he convinces to go to King Hákon on his behalf. Hákon denied Egill's claim, so Arinbjorn compensated Egill with forty marks of silver.

Egill and Arinbjörn went raiding in Saxony and Frisia, after which they stayed with Thorstein Thoruson (Þorsteinn Þóruson). King Hakon requested Thorstein to collect tribute in Värmland or be sentenced to outlawry. Egill went in Thorsteinn's place. Egill traveled with some of King Hákon's men to Värmland and fought battles, Egill killing many times more foes than his companions.

Egill lived to be an old age. Arinbjörn became a close advisor to Harald Eiríksson, to whom Egill composed a poem. Egill's son Bodvar (Böðvar) died in a shipwreck. Egill composed a poem in his honor. Egill's son Thorsteinn has many feuds with Steinar, son of Onund Sjoni (Önundr sjóni Ánason), over land and cattle grazing. Egill became frail and blind. His one last wish was to travel to the Althing and toss silver he received from King Æthelstan for the people to fight over. When he was denied this, he commanded two enslaved men to help him conceal his silver treasure. After this act, he killed the two men to conceal the location and to punish his son-in-law. near Mosfellsbær, giving birth to the legend of Silfur Egils ("Egill's Silver").

== Interpretation ==
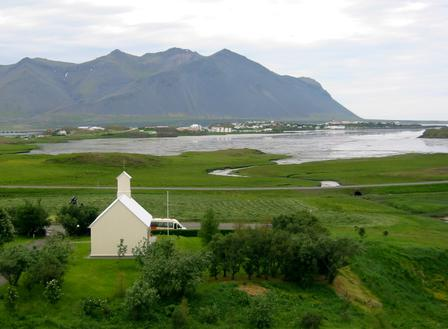
A view of Borg á Mýrum where Egill Skallagrímsson spent much of his life.

The character of Egill is complex and full of seeming contradictions. His multifaceted nature reflects the extreme qualities of his family, a family of men who are either ugly or astoundingly handsome; a family which includes 'shape-shifters', who become suddenly mad, violent and cruel, though they may at other times be deliberate and wise; a family which neither submits to the will of kings, nor stands in open rebellion. His character is also reflected in the storytelling conventions of the text, a difficult text populated by characters with similar or identical names, living out various permutations of very similar stories. The two handsome Thorolfs (Þórólfs) die heroic deaths, while their brothers Skallagrim and Egill both die in old age after spitefully burying their wealth in the wilderness. The descendants of Kveldúlfr find themselves involved in two complicated inheritance feuds, at one time rejecting the claims of illegitimate children of a second marriage, and at another time claiming land on behalf of another illegitimate child born to similar circumstances.

At times in Egill's saga Egill comes across as a brute who often acts quickly and irrationally for no reason. He appears to be a shallow creature and in many instances the only time he appears to put much thought into anything is when he composes and recites poetry. Egill is in reality a man of many virtues which are central to his character. He values honor, loyalty, respect, and friendship above all other things. He takes it as a great personal insult when someone breaks any of these values and as a result he typically destroys that person either through physical force or through poetry. His reactions are usually on a grand scale to the point where they are often outrageous and entertaining. The value code by which Egill lived was the same as that of many Scandinavians at the time of the story's composition. The story is set in a time when many people were migrating, most notably from Norway to Iceland. Life was harsh, particularly during the long, cold winters, when it was crucial for people to get along and work together.

Poetry is used throughout most of the saga and Egill is a master of the art. Egill's Saga takes place during a time of oral tradition. Poetry was used to establish a person's reputation for good or evil, and a great poem could make its characters immortal. Rulers valued poets for their ability to make or break a man, increasing his fame or besmirching his good name. As a poet, Egill was a powerful and valued man.

One of the first negative poems in Egill's saga is a threatening poem in chapter 27 that displays Skallagrim's power after he had just plundered a ship and killed many men. Later, in chapter 38, Skallagrim composes an insulting poem about King Eirik after the king had given Skallagrim a gift not commensurate with his worth. In chapters 55 and 81, Egill composes two powerful poems that show how grief-stricken he is when his brother Thorolfr and his son Bodvar die. These poems are also meant to honor the two. These are only a few examples of the many poems in the saga which portray people in a positive or negative light.

There are also poems which show a much softer side to the Icelandic male characters. One of these is in chapter 55 when King Æthelstan acknowledges the death of Egill's brother, Thorolfr, caused by the King's error in judgement. Egill thanks the king with a number of praise poems showing how considerate and generous the king is. We see a very different side of Egill in chapter 56 when he declares his secret love for his future wife, in a love poem. In chapters 60–62, Egill is confronted with a situation where he must greet King Eirik, with whom he is on bad terms. King Eirik wants Egill dead and at the urging of his friend Arinbjorn, Egill composes a drápa (one of the most complicated forms of poetry) of 20 stanzas praising the king. Thanks to the poem, named Höfuðlausn (Head-Ransom) Egill is allowed to leave Eiríkr's court alive, since killing him would make Eiríkr look like a fool. In chapter 80, Egill composes another praise poem of 25 stanzas expressing his gratitude towards his lifelong friend Arinbjörn for saving his life in his meeting with King Eiríkr. These more positive poems show us a kinder side to the typically rough and violent people of Egill's saga.

As a work of literature, Egill's Saga is generally considered to be amongst the best of the Icelandic sagas, along with Njáls saga, Gísla saga Súrssonar, and Laxdæla saga.

== Characters ==
A detailed family tree connecting major and minor characters through blood and marriage can be found here

== Manuscripts ==
The foundational work on the manuscript transmission of Egils saga was undertaken by Jón Helgason. He and his successors established that the prose parts of the saga vary little from one medieval manuscript to another, representing subtle differences of style rather than major differences of plot or characterisation. The poetic content varies more; in particular, the celebrated long poems Höfuðlausn, Arinbjarnarkviða, and Sonatorrek, though usually included in modern editions and translations of the saga, survive in few manuscripts.

Modern scholarship has grouped the surviving manuscripts of Egils saga into three groups, known as A, B, and C:

- A is first attested by the thirteenth-century fragment known as θ; two further medieval fragments; and, much more fully, by Möðruvallabók (copied around 1320×50) and copies thereof.
- B is a group to which six vellum fragments belong, along with the Wolfenbüttel Codex (Wolfenbüttel, Herzog August Library, 9. 10. Aug. 4°, copied around 1350), and a number of paper manuscripts (most importantly Reykjavík, Stofnun Árna Magnússonar, AM 463 4to and AM 560 d 4to, each of which preserves material from one or more B-type medieval manuscript now lost).
- C is a medieval version first represented by two vellum fragments, known as ε (fifteenth-century) and α (sixteenth-century), which is largely attested in two paper copies made of a now lost manuscript by Ketill Jörundsson in the seventeenth century.
  - In 1643, a C-text was versified as rímur by Jón Guðmundsson of Rauðseyjar (now found in Reykjavík, Stofnun Arna Magnússonar, AM 610a 4to and a manuscript Sauðárkrókur, Héraðsskjalasafn Skagfirðinga). Later in the seventeenth century, this verse version was combined with a prose text of the saga to produce a substantially modified version of the saga traditionally known by scholars as Vitlausa Egils saga ('the daft saga of Egill') but in some twenty-first-century scholarship as 'the New Egils saga'.

== Editions ==
Egils saga was first printed by Magnús Moberg on the island of Hrappsey in Iceland in 1782 (baekur.is). Modern editions include:

- Nordal, Sigurður (ed.), Egils saga Skallagrímssonar, Íslenzk fornrit, 2 (Reykjavík, 1933)
- Guðni Jónsson (ed.), Egils saga Skalla-grímssonar (Reykjavík: Bókaútgáfa Menningarsjóðs og þjóðvinafélagsins, 1945) (heimskringla.no)
- Bergljót Kristjánsdóttir and Svanhildur Óskarsdóttir (eds), Egils saga: Með formála, viðaukum, skýringum og skrám, Sígildar sögur, 2 (Reykjavík: Mál og menning, 1994) (wikisaga.hi.is)
- Bjarni Einarsson (ed.), Egils saga (London: Viking Society for Northern Research, 2003) (pdf)
- Modernised spelling (source unclear) (snerpa)

== Translations ==
- Green, W. C. (1893). The Story of Egil Skallagrimsson. London: Elliot Stock. (wikisaga.hi.is, sagadb.org)
- Eddison, E. R. (1930). Egil's Saga. Cambridge: Cambridge University Press.
- Jones, Gwyn (1960). Egil's Saga. New York: Twayne: The American Scandinavian Foundation.
- Fell, Christine (1975). Egil's Saga. London: Dent. ISBN 0460872656.
- Pálsson, Hermann; Edwards, Paul (1976). Egil's Saga. Harmondsworth: Penguin. ISBN 0140443215.
- Scudder, Bernard (1997). "Egil's Saga". In Hreinsson, Viðar (ed.). The Complete Sagas of Icelanders Including 49 Tales. Volume 1. Reykjavík: Leifur Eiríksson. ISBN 9979929308.
- Scudder, Bernard (trans.) (2000) [1997]. "Egil's Saga". In Örnólfur Thorsson (ed.). The Sagas of Icelanders: A Selection. Smiley, Jane (preface), Kellogg, Robert (Introduction). New York: Penguin. pp. 3–184. ISBN 9979929308.
  - Repr. Scudder, Bernard (2004). Egil's Saga. London: Penguin. ISBN 0140447709.
