= Álfheimr =

Home of the elves in Nordic mythology

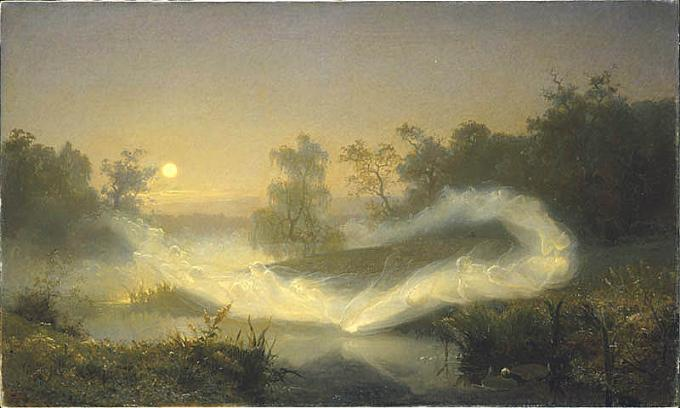
Dancing Elves, by August Malmström, 1866

In Norse cosmology, Álfheimr (Old Norse: [ˈɑːlvˌhɛimz̠], "Home of the Elves" or "Elfland"; anglicized as Alfheim), also called "Ljósálfheimr" (Ljósálf[a]heimr [ˈljoːsˌɑːlv(ɑ)ˌhɛimz̠], "home of the Light Elves"), is home of the Light Elves.

== Etymology ==
Álfheimr is an Old Norse compound word formed from álfr, 'elf', and heimr, 'home or world'.

== Attestations ==
Álfheim as an abode of the Elves is mentioned only twice in Old Norse texts.

=== Grímnismál ===
The Eddic poem Grímnismál describes twelve divine dwellings beginning the stanza 5 with:

Old Norse text	Bellows translation
Ýdalir heita, þar er Ullr hefir sér of görva sali; Alfheim Frey gáfu í árdaga tívar at tannféi.	Ydalir call they the place where Ull A hall for himself hath set; And Alfheim the gods to Freyr once gave As a tooth-gift in ancient times.

A tooth-gift is a gift given to an infant on the cutting of the first tooth.

=== Gylfaginning ===
In the 12th century Eddic prose Gylfaginning, Snorri Sturluson relates it in the stanza 17 as the first of a series of abodes in heaven:

Old Norse text

Margir staðir eru þar göfugligir. Sá er einn staðr þar, er kallaðr er Álfheimr. Þar byggvir fólk þat, er Ljósálfar heita, en Dökkálfar búa niðri í jörðu, ok eru þeir ólíkir þeim sýnum ok miklu ólíkari reyndum. Ljósálfar eru fegri en sól sýnum, en Dökkálfar eru svartari en bik.

Brodeur translation

Many places are there, and glorious. That which is called Álfheimr is one, where dwell the peoples called Light-Elves; but the Dark-Elves dwell down in the earth, and they are unlike in appearance, but by far more unlike in nature. The Light-Elves are fairer to look upon than the sun, but the Dark-Elves are blacker than pitch.

Later in the section, in speaking of a hall in the Highest Heaven called Gimlé that shall survive when heaven and earth have died, explains:

Old Norse text

Svá er sagt, at annarr himinn sé suðr ok upp frá þessum himni, ok heitir sá Andlangr, en inn þriði himinn sé enn upp frá þeim, ok heitir sá Víðbláinn, ok á þeim himni hyggjum vér þenna stað vera. En Ljósálfar einir, hyggjum vér, at nú byggvi þá staði.

Brodeur translation

It is said that another heaven is to the southward and upward of this one, and it is called Andlangr; but the third heaven is yet above that, and it is called Vídbláinn, and in that heaven we think this abode is. But we believe that none but Light-Elves inhabit these mansions now.

== See also ==
- Álfheimr (region)
- Freyr
- Alfheimbjerg
- Fairyland, a folkloric location sometimes referred to as Elfame
- Svartálfaheimr
- Elf
- Svartálfar (black elves)

== Bibliography ==
=== Primary ===
- Bellows, Henry Adam (2004). The poetic Edda : the mythological poems. Mineola, NY: Dover Publications. ISBN 9780486437101.
- Sturluson, Snorri (2018). The Prose Edda. Translated by Brodeur, Arthur Gilchrist. Franklin Classics Trade Press. ISBN 9780344335013.
- "Grímnismál (Old Norse)". heimskringla.com.
- "Gylfaginning (Old Norse)". heimskringla.no.
