= Dökkálfar and Ljósálfar =

Two classes of elves in Norse mythology

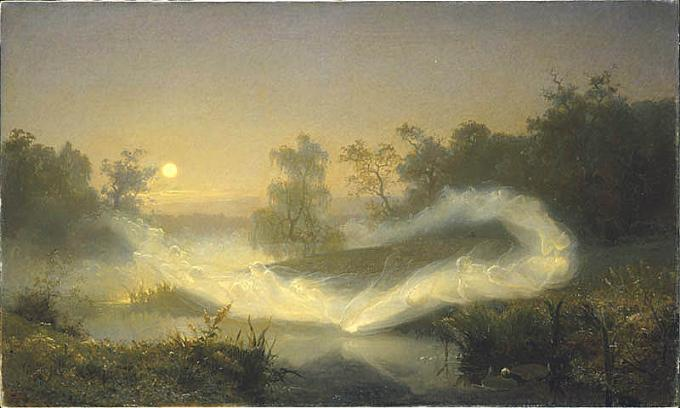
Älvalek (Elfplay or Dancing Fairies) (1866) by August Malmström

In Norse mythology, Dökkálfar ("Dark Elves") (Note: Old Norse: Dǫkkálfar, singular Dǫkkálfr) and Ljósálfar ("Light Elves") (Note: Singular Ljósálfr) are two contrasting types of elves; the dark elves dwell within the earth and have a dark complexion, while the light elves live in Álfheimr, and are "fairer than the sun to look at". The Ljósálfar and the Dökkálfar are attested in the Prose Edda, written in the 13th century by Snorri Sturluson, and in the late Old Norse poem Hrafnagaldr Óðins. Scholars have produced theories about the origin and implications of the dualistic concept.

== Attestations ==
=== Prose Edda ===
In the Prose Edda, the Dökkálfar and the Ljósálfar are described in chapter 17 of the book Gylfaginning. In the chapter, Gangleri (the king Gylfi in disguise) asks the enthroned figure of High what other "chief centres" there are in the heavens outside of the spring Urðarbrunnr. Gangleri responds that there are many fine places in heaven, including a place called Álfheimr (Old Norse 'Elf Home' or 'Elf World'). High says that the Ljósálfar live in Álfheimr, while the Dökkálfar dwell underground and look—and particularly behave—quite unlike the Ljósálfar. High describes the Ljósálfar as "fairer than the sun to look at", while the Dökkálfar are "blacker than pitch".

As chapter 17 continues, Gangleri asks what will protect the beautiful hall of Gimlé, previously described as "the southernmost end of heaven", when the fires of Surtr "burn heaven and earth" (Ragnarök). High responds that there are in fact other heavens. The first called Andlàngr, he says, is "south of and above this heaven of ours" and "we believe" Gimlé is located in the third heaven "still further above that one", Víðbláinn. High adds that "we believe it is only light-elves who inhabit these places for the time being".

=== Hrafnagaldr Óðins ===
There occurs an additional mention of the dökkálfar in the late Old Norse poem Hrafnagaldr Óðins ("Odin's Raven-galdr"), stanza 25.

== Theories and interpretations ==
As the concept is only recorded in Gylfaginning and the late poem Hrafnagaldr Óðins, it is unclear whether the distinction between the two types of elves originated with Snorri, or if he was merely recounting a concept already developed.

=== Question of Christian influence ===
The sub-classification perhaps resulted from Christian influence, by way of importation of the concept of good and evil and angels of light and darkness. Anne Holtsmark aired this view, (Note: "Anne Holtsmark has pointed out that he probably got his idea of light and dark elves from the Christian teaching of 'white' and 'black' angels", "Men ikke alle alver er gode, fra synonymet andi, Lat. spiritus, har begrepet overtatt en tvedeling i «gode og onde ånder», Snorre kalle dem liósálfar og dokkálfar. Samme tvedeling er gjennomført i den kristne lære når det gjelder englene. Guds engler er i himmelen og djevelens i helvete, d.e. den flokken av tilhengere Satael førte med seg da han ble styrtet i avgrunnen, Elucidarius 1869, s. 12 "; translation: But not all elves are good, and from synonyms [Icel.] andi, Lat. spiritus, it has acquired the sense of the dichotomy of "good and evil spirits," Snorri calls them liósálfar and dokkálfar. The same dichotomy is implemented in the Christian doctrine regarding angels: the angels of God in heaven and the angels of the devil in hell, i.e., the flock of followers whom Satanel brought with him when he was plunged into the abyss, Elucidarius, 1869, p.12") though with some reservation, since "good vs. evil" dualism is not confined to Christian thinking. (Note: Thus Grimm and Holtsmark described "angels" as a parallel phenomenon, at least in their preliminary thesis, Grimm allowing that "other mythologies have set up" this dualism also, and Holtsmark suggesting that the dichotomy inherent in similar Icelandic (andi) and Latin terms (spiritus) may have rubbed off onto "elves".) Aside from some additional observations to encourage the hypothesis, (Note: Such as: "Begge slags vesener blir beskrevet i ordlag som ellers blir brukt om engler og djevler," translation: Both types of beings [liósalfar and døkkalfar] are described in language otherwise used for angels and devils.) Holtsmark has been credited with demonstrating that Snorri borrowed from Christian writings, specifically that "Snorri’s description of Víðbláinn [the third heaven populated by light-elves] was almost certainly influenced by (and possibly based on) the account of the angels in the Elucidarius." (Note: By her own admission Holtsmark regarded the explanation of the third heaven as more challenging than the second heaven Andlangr, crediting Falk for the insight for connecting it to andlegr or "spiritual" heaven of the Elucidarius. "Falk har sikkert rett i at Andlangr er laget av andlegr himinn; det andre navnet er ikke så let å forstå, det tør også være laget for anledningen.")

Dissenters of the view that the dark and light elves were a later invention, such as Rudolf Simek and Gabriel Turville-Petre, feel rather that "dark" and "light" aspects of the same beings not inherently unlikely, death and fertility cults often being closely related.

=== Dwarfs ===
Since the Prose Edda describes the dökkálfar as being subterranean dwellers, they may be dwarfs under another name, in the opinion of a number of scholars such as John Lindow.

The Prose Edda also uniquely mentions the svartálfar ('black elves'), but there are reasons to believe these also refer to merely dwarfs. (Note: Since Snorri says twice over that the World of Black Elves (Svartálfaheimr) are inhabited by certain dwarfs. The dwarfs that crafted Gleipnir in Gylfaginning 34 and the dwarf Andvari in Skáldskaparmál 39 (Faulkes 1995, pp. 28, 100) are said by Snorri to live in the World of the Black Elves.)

Consequently, Lindow and other commentators have remarked that there may not have been any distinction intended between dark-elves and black-elves by those who coined and used those terms. (Note: Lindow: "whether he [Snorri] intended a distinction between the dark-elves and black-elves is unknown." Lassen: "Both these kinds of dwarfs (if they were different)") Lotte Motz's paper on elves commingles, and hence equates "dark-elves" and "black-elves" from the outset.

=== Grimm's trinity ===
Jacob Grimm surmised that the proto-elf (ursprünglich) was probably a "light-colored, white, good spirit" while the dwarfs may have been conceived as "black spirits" by relative comparison. But the "two classes of creatures were getting confounded", and there arose a need to coin the term "light-elf" (ljósálfar, or hvítálfar—"white elves") to refer to the "elves proper". This was counterpart to the "dark-elf" (dökkálfar, or svartálfar—"black elves"). (Note: Stallybrass's actual phrasing in his translation was "recourse was had to composition, and the elves proper were named liosâlfar" (2: 444) for Grimm's "half man durch zusammen-setzung und nannte die eigentlichen âlfar liosâlfar." Grimm 1844, 1: 413)

Preferring it over duality, Grimm postulated three kinds of elves (ljósálfar, dökkálfar, svartálfar) present in Norse mythology.

But Grimm's "tripartite division" (as Shippey calls it) faced "trouble" in Snorri's statement that dark-elves were pitch-black, as this would lead to the "first reduction" that "dark-elves = black-elves". As a solution, Grimm "pronounce[es] Snorri's statement fallacious", and hypothesizes that "dark elves" were not really 'dark' but rather 'dingy' or 'pale'. And while conceding that "such a Trilogy still [lacks] decisive proof," draws parallels from the white, brown and black subterranean in Pomeranian legend, and the white, pale, and black troops of spirits come to claim souls in the tale of Solomon and Marcolf.

== See also ==
- Classifications of fairies
- Svartálfar
- Duende
