= Death in Norse paganism =

Ideas concerning death and the afterlife in Norse pagan belief systems

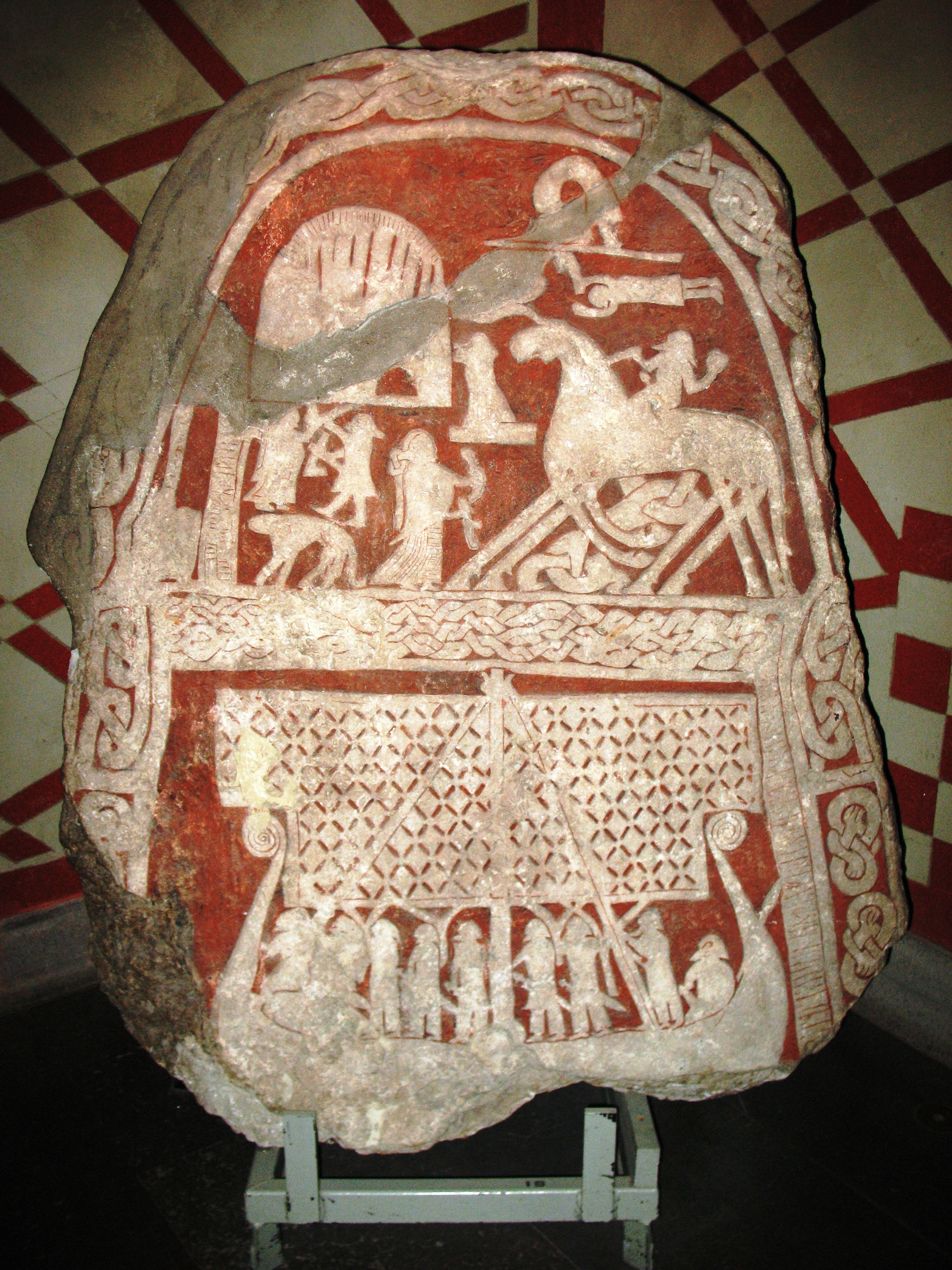
This image is usually interpreted as a Valkyrie who welcomes a dead man, or Odin himself, on the Tjängvide image stone from Gotland, in the Swedish Museum of National Antiquities in Stockholm.

Death in Norse paganism was associated with diverse customs and beliefs that varied with time, location and social group, and did not form a structured, uniform system. After the funeral, the individual could go to a range of afterlives including Valhalla (a hall ruled by Odin for the warrior elite who die in battle), Fólkvangr (ruled over by Freyja), Hel (a realm for those who die of natural causes), and living on physically in the landscape. These afterlives show blurred boundaries and exist alongside a number of minor afterlives that may have been significant in Nordic paganism. The dead were also seen as being able to bestow land fertility, often in return for votive offerings, and knowledge, either willingly or after coercion. Many of these beliefs and practices continued in altered forms after the Christianisation of the Germanic peoples in folk belief.

== The self ==
The concept of the self in pre-Christian Nordic religion was diverse and is not presented as rigid or consistent in surviving Old Norse texts, nor is there a strict dualism of body and soul as in Christianity. Despite this, components have been identified that could together comprise the individual:

- Hugr ('mind', 'prudence', 'thought' and 'soul') The hugr was conceived of as being able to leave the body, often in the form of an animal, while the body lay asleep or in a trance. Interruption of the trance would result in the return of the hugr to the body as with Böðvar Bjarki in Hrólfs saga kraka.
- Hamr ('skin', 'body', 'shape', 'form'). It is used in the context of the hugr when it takes shape and shapeshifting. Those who are able to shapeshift are described as Old Norse: hamrammr ('shape strong')
- Fylgja – a companion external to the body that often takes on the form of a woman or animal and is usually only able to be seen by certain individuals or in dreams. The fylgja is linked with the fate of the individual and can leave the individual after death, or transfer to family members.
- Hamingja – an entity that comprises the luck of a person. The hamingja could leave the person after their death and be inherited by another, including those outside the family. Based on their female, sometimes warlike, appearance and role in a person's fate, a link has been proposed with valkyries. The transfer of hamingja to a newborn is sometimes associated with them being named after the deceased.
- Vörðr - a warden spirit, believed to follow every person from birth to death as part of, or companion to, their soul. At times, the warden could reveal itself as a small light or as the shape (hamr) of the person. The perception of another person's warden could cause a physical sensation such as an itching hand or nose, as a foreboding or an apparition. The warden could arrive before the actual person, which someone endowed with fine senses might perceive. The warden of a dead person could sometimes become a revenant, haunting particular spots or individuals. In this case, the revenant warden was always distinct from more conscious undeads, such as the draugar.

It has been proposed that when the body had been broken down, through decay or immolation, the non-physical component of the individual could start the journey to a realm of the dead; however, other sources emphasise physical life after death as draugs.

== Funeral ==
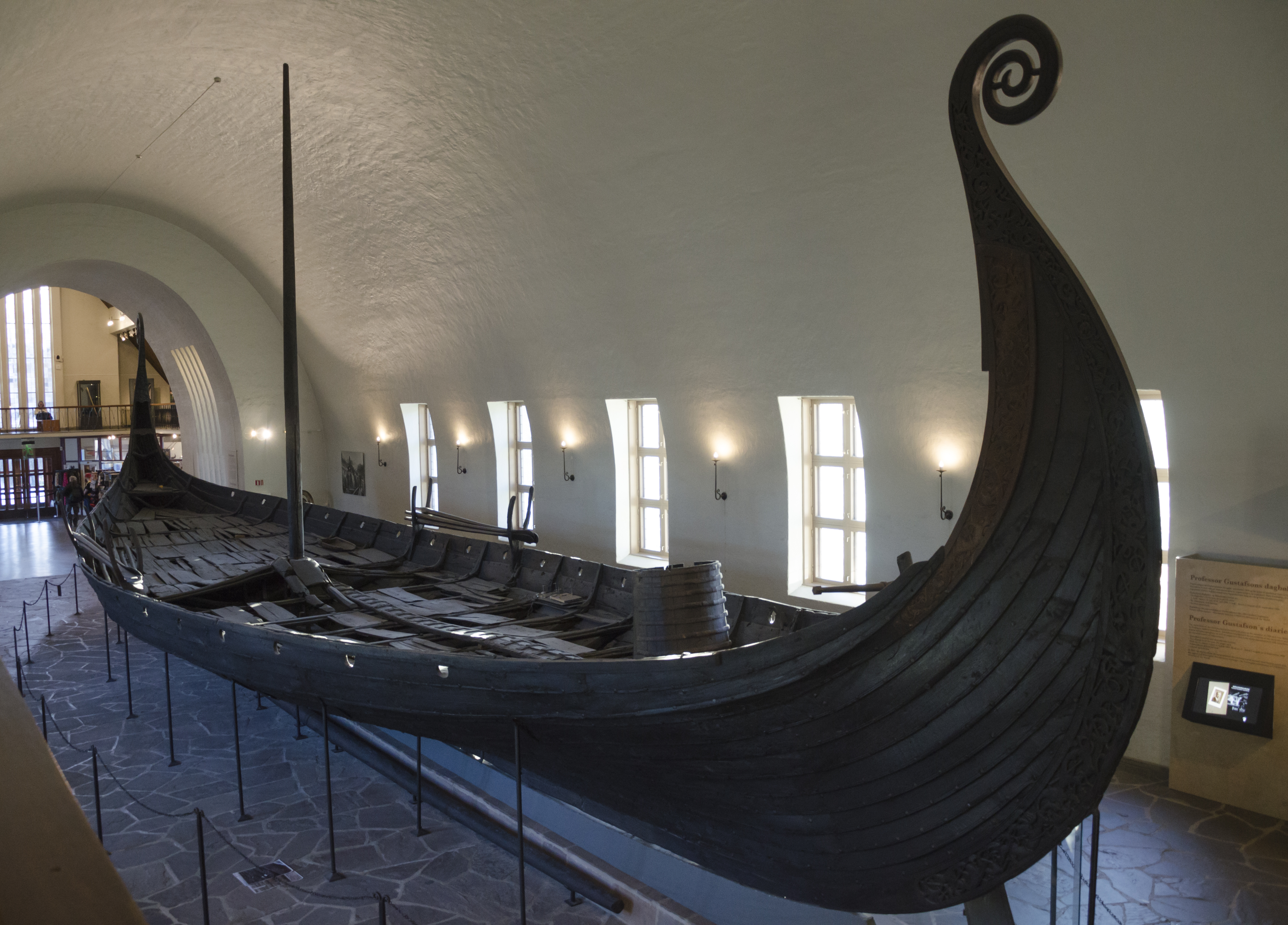
The Oseberg ship (Viking Ship Museum, Norway)

Prior to Christianisation, the North Germanic peoples practiced a variety of burial customs, such as cremation and inhumation, that varied in popularity over time. Remains were buried, such as in howes, and were typically accompanied by grave goods.

Germanic ship burials are well attested, both in archeology, such as at Oseberg and Sutton Hoo and in writing, such as Gisla Saga; sending out the deceased into the sea on a ship is also attested in literary sources, such as of Scyld in Beowulf and Baldr in the Prose Edda.

== Afterlives and rebirth ==
=== Hel ===
Hel, according to Snorri, is an underground realm ruled by Loki's daughter Hel that is the afterlife for most individuals. Within or near Hel is Náströnd, a place of darkness and horror reserved for oath-breakers, murderers and adulterers. On Náströnd is a hall woven with the spines of snakes, a description which has been noted to show significant linguistic similarity with an Old English kenning for the Christian Hell, wyrmsele (snake hall). Hel's realm is separated from the world of the living by the river Gjöll, spanned by the bridge Gjallarbrú. The gates are heavy, and close behind those who pass it, preventing them from returning to the realm of the living. Scholars believe that these ideas of Hel are influenced by Early Medieval Christianity, which taught of a realm of punishment in contrast to paradise. The word Helviti, which still is the name of Hell in modern North Germanic languages, means "Hel's punishment".

Hel was not necessarily conceived of as dark and dreary to heathen Scandinavians; the poem Baldrs draumar describes in Hel a hall, decorated with gold and a lavish feasting table ready for the celebration of Baldr's arrival to the realm after his coming death. Still, it was probably less desired than Valhalla to some individuals, with sagas telling of warriors who cut themselves with spears before dying in order to trick Hel into thinking that they had died heroic deaths in battle.

In the story of Hadingus, in Gesta Danorum, Saxo describes a land of the dead that may be Hel. In this account, Hadding is led by an old woman through a sunny land that could grow herbs even in winter, with a great wall that Hadding couldn't pass. The woman then cut the head of a cockerel and threw it over the wall, whereupon it came back to life and could be heard crowing on the other side.

=== Valhalla ===
Valhalla is an afterlife where those who die in battle gather as einherjar, in preparation for the last great battle during Ragnarök. In opposition to Hel's realm, which was a subterranean realm of the dead, it appears that Valhalla was located somewhere in the heavens. Valhalla is presented primarily as an abode for deceased men, with the principal female figures being the valkyries who gather the fallen warriors on the battlefield and bring them to Odin's hall, where they pour mead for them. In Gisla saga, 'hel-shoes' are put on men's feet to allow them to walk to Valhalla.

In Hárbarðsljóð, Hárbarðr (who is typically identified as Odin), taunts Thor by saying that the earls who die in battle go to Odin, while Thor receives the thralls.

Some who die in battle are described as going to Hel rather than Valhalla. Valhalla is also not exclusively reserved for those who die in battle, such as in Krákumál where Ragnar Loðbrok describes that he will soon be in Valhalla, despite being killed by snakes in a pit. In Gautrek's Saga members of a household believe they will go to Valhalla after sacrificing themselves to Odin by jumping off a precipice named Ætternisstapa (Family Cliff). The accuracy of this as a historic practice has been questioned; however, it is also referenced in Kristni saga, and Bede describes a similar or shared tradition in England.

Grímnismál describes how Valhalla's roof is made of spears and shields, similar to the hall of the howe-dweller Geirröðr in Þorsteins þáttr bæjarmagns.

It has been proposed that Valhalla developed and gained importance around 500 CE, when Odin gained prominence relative to female gods associated with death, amid other changes in religious practice, such as a shift in focus from bodies of water to halls and cult buildings, and the development of an aristocratic warrior elite in southern Scandinavia seeking territorial expansion.

=== Fólkvangr ===
Fólkvangr is an afterlife field ruled over by Freyja, who chooses half of those who die in battle to reside with her there, attested solely in the Poetic Edda poem Grímnismál:

Fólkvangr er inn níundi,
en þar Freyja ræðr
sessa kostum í sal;
halfan val
hon kýss hverjan dag,
en halfan Óðinn á.

— Old Norse text
Translation:

Fôlkvang is the ninth,
there Freyia directs
the sittings in the hall.
She half the fallen
chooses each day,
but Odin th' other half.

— Thorpe Translation

In Egil's saga, Þorgerðr Egilsdóttir after the death of her brother proclaims that she will not eat again until she dines with Freyja. In this section, Fólkvangr is not explicitly mentioned and the precise afterlife in which she believes she will meet Freyja is unclear.

=== Land ===
==== Burial mounds ====
In Old Norse sources, the deceased can become animate after burial as a draug (also known as Old Norse: aptrgangr (after-walker) or Old Norse: haugbúi (howe-dweller)). Draugs are frequently hostile, especially when the person was unpleasant in life, becoming inhumanly strong and large, and causing destruction and killing in the local area; they commonly damage roofs by riding on them and in Flóamanna saga cause plague. This typically lasts until the body is exhumed and burned, or decapitated – practices continued after the conversion to Christianity. Due to the dangers posed by the ash, it is typically buried away from the settlement. In Eyrbyggja saga, the ash is licked by a cow which gives birth to a calf that later kills the man who burnt the body.

Individuals who become harmful howe-dweller are often cruel or unsociable in life, such as Glamr in Grettis saga and Þórólfr bægifótr in Eyrbyggja saga. Aptrgǫngur are not always monstrous, however, as in the case of Gunnar Hámundarson in Njal's saga:

Now those two, Skarphedinn and Hogni, were out of doors one evening by Gunnar's cairn on the south side. The moon and stars were shining clear and bright, but every now and then the clouds drove over them. Then all at once they thought they saw the cairn standing open, and lo! Gunnar had turned himself in the cairn and looked at the moon. They thought they saw four lights burning in the cairn, and none of them threw a shadow. They saw that Gunnar was merry, and he wore a joyful face. He sang a song, and so loud, that it might have been heard though they had been farther off.

Fires in inhabited howes are also seen in Grettis saga during the encounter with the draug Karr the Old and Hervarar saga ok Heidreks when Hervor goes to her father Angantyr's mound to obtain the sword Tyrfing, in the latter of which it is termed (Old Norse: haugaeldrinn). Once awake, the dead Angantyr refers to the entrance to his grave as "Hel's gate" (Old Norse: helgrind), suggesting there is no clear distinction between the realm and the physical place the individual inhabits after death. In the episode in Hervarar saga ok Heidreks, the fire acts as a boundary between the living and the dead, akin to the fiery barrier that separates the realms of the gods and jötnar in Skírnismál.

In addition to the ambiguity between Hel and the grave, the deceased can also return to their howe from Valhalla, as in Helgakviða Hundingsbana II, where the hero Helgi physically travels from there by night to his open burial mound where he lies with wife Sigrún. Here, Helgi is described as being bloody, with ice-cold hands and frost in his hair, and tells her that her weeping over him causes him pain, similar to in Laxdæla saga.

==== Fells, hills and mountains ====
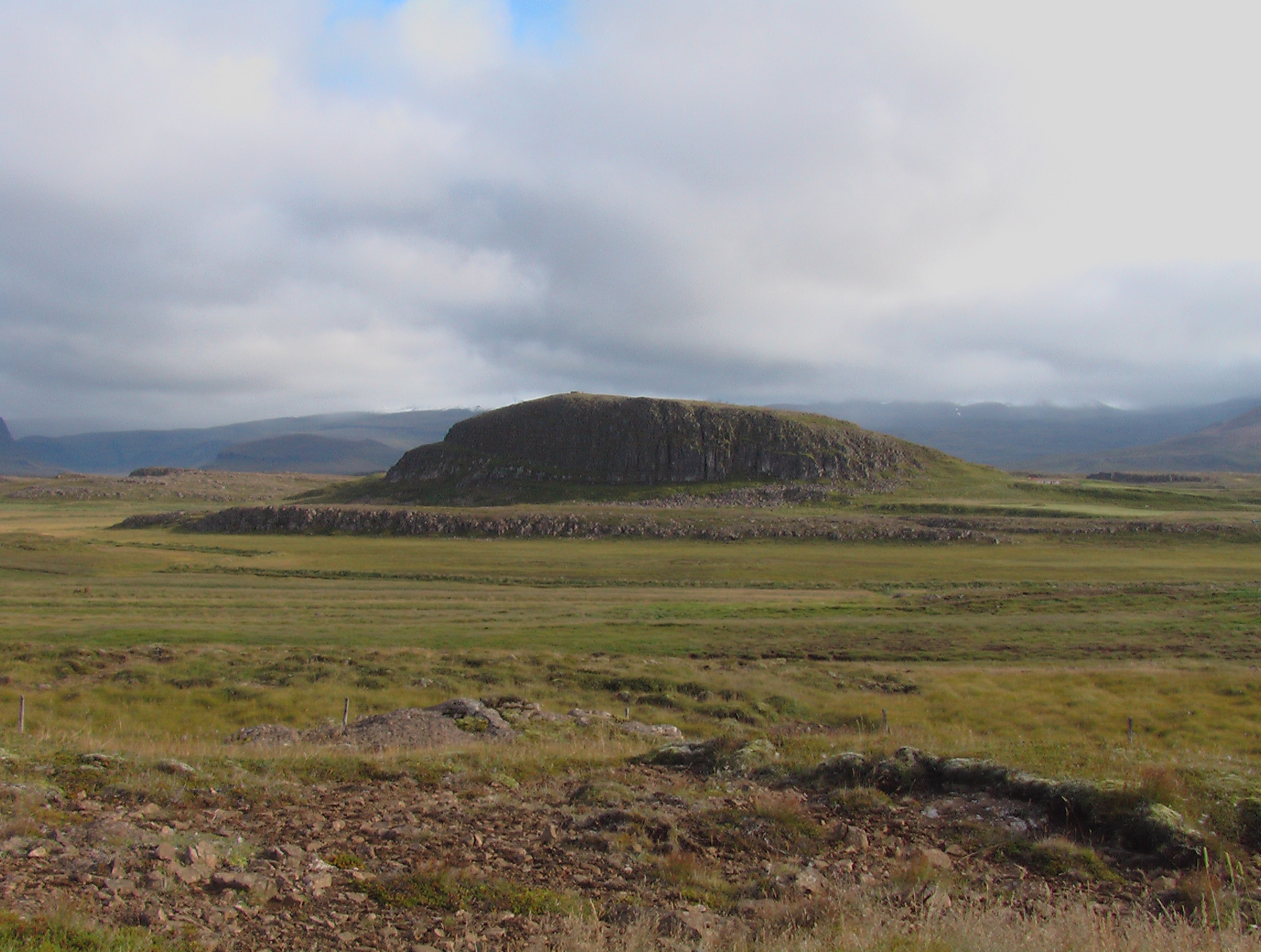
Helgafell in western Iceland

The entry of the dead into hills is described in Eyrbyggja saga where the worshipper of Thor, Þórólfr Mostrarskegg holds Helgafell ("Holyfell"), a hill or mountain near his home, sacred. Þórólfr's son Þorsteinn Þorskabítr later dies, along with his crew, on a fishing expedition:

Þat var eitt kveld um haustit, at sauðamaðr Þorsteins fór at fé fyrir norðan Helgafell. Hann sá, at fjallit laukst upp norðan. Hann sá inn í fjallit elda stóra ok heyrði þangat mikinn glaum ok hornaskvöl, ok er hann hlýddi, ef hann næmi orðaskil, heyði hann, at þar var heilsat Þorsteini þorskabít ok förunautum hans ok mælt, at hann skal sitja í öndvegi gegnt feðr sínum.

— Old Norse text
Translation:

...But on an evening of harvest a shepherd-man of Thorstein's fared after his sheep north of Holyfell; there he saw how the fell was opened on the north side, and in the fell he saw mighty fires, and heard huge clamour therein, and the clank of drinking-horns; and when he hearkened if perchance he might hear any words clear of others, he heard that there was welcomed Thorstein Codbiter and his crew, and he was bidden to sit in the high-seat over against his father.

— Morris Translation

Landnámabók supports this, stating that Þórólfr's kinsmen believed they would enter into the fell when they died. Njáls saga also gives an account of Svanr, a wizard, who was welcomed into the mountain Kaldbak after he drowned at sea. The belief in entering into hills, such as Þorisbjorg and Melifell, upon death is referenced elsewhere in Landnámabók. A similar belief among Sámi continued into the modern period. It has been suggested that belief in the dead living in howes and mountains are connected, with both being presented as halls on the inside.

It has been noted that those who are associated with this belief in saga literature and Landnámabók are related to one another. This had led to the proposal that the belief was part of a local, or family practice that was brought to Iceland early in the 10th century.

=== Other afterlives ===
Rán, the wife of Ægir, is a god who receives into her halls those who drown at sea, as described in sources such as Friðþjófs saga and Sonatorrek. In Skáldskaparmál, she is described as catching the drowned in her net. Nonetheless, Rán's halls are not the sole afterlife for those who die at sea, such as in Eyrbyggja saga when Þorsteinn Þorskabítr and his crew die on a fishing trip but are seen entering into Helgafell. Ejybyggja saga also describes Þorod and his men being killed when their ship is driven ashore, whereupon their bodies are lost. At the funeral feast, the men enter dripping wet and are welcomed because of the belief that attending one's own funeral after drowning was a sign that one was well received by Rán.

Gimlé is a golden hall attested in Völuspá that will be the residence of mankind after Ragnarök. Snorri Sturluson adds to this description in Gylfaginning, stating that it is reserved for those who acted virtuously in life and is located in the third heaven, Víðbláinn, separate from Andlàngr and Asgard. Along with Gimlé, two more halls are listed by Snorri that are named Brimir and Sindri; however, some translators such as Caroline Larrington read these names as belonging to the owners of the halls. Snorri's additions are believed by scholars to have been heavily influenced by Christian teaching, based on the levels of heavens and also that Snorri interpreted Ragnarök as the Judgement Day for one's actions. Belief in these afterlives thus do not likely represent a pre-Christian worldview.

The ásynja Gefjun is attended by women who die unmarried according to Gylfaginning. This is not attested elsewhere and may be an invention by Snorri although it has been noted that the association between the god and chastity is also seen in Völsa þáttr, when she is invoked by a girl who opposes the religious practice involving an embalmed phallus.

=== Rebirth ===
Surviving texts indicate that there was a belief in rebirth in Germanic paganism. In Helgakviða Hundingsbana II and Helgakviða Hjörvarðssonar in the Poetic Edda describe the rebirth of the lovers Helgi Hundingsbane and Sváva, and Helgi and Sigrún respectively. Rebirth is also suggested in some sagas such as of Starkaðr and Olaf Geirstad-Alf, the latter case of which is directly associated with entry into the deceased's burial mound. Scholars have also explored the potential association with the naming newborns after the dead, often through the family line.

Scholars have proposed that cyclic time was the original format for the mythology. Most notably, the destruction of the world in Ragnarök and its subsequent rebirth, as described in Völuspá and Gylfaginning, could be seen as a cycle, although it is never explicitly stated to occur more than once.

== Cultic importance ==
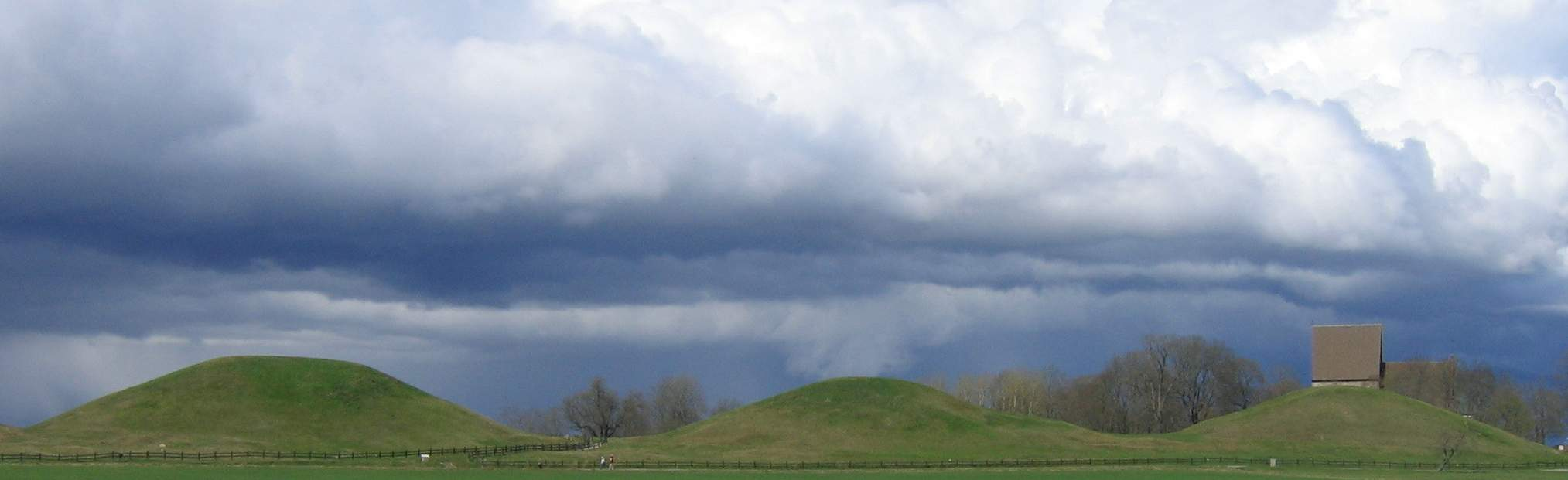
The three large "royal mounds" at Gamla Uppsala.

=== Sites of worship ===
Old Norse sources describe burial mounds acting as places of religious activity, often with the aim of bringing or maintaining the fertility of the land. In some sources such as Saga Ólafs ens Helga, they are referred to as Old Norse: blothaugar (sacrificial howes).

In some accounts the recipient of worship are deceased rulers such as King Guðmund in the Hauksbók manuscript version of Hervarar saga ok Heidreks. Hálfdanar saga Svarta, in Heimskringla, describes that harvests were better under the rule of Halfdan the Black than with previous kings. When he died, his body was divided in four, and each piece was buried in a howe to ensure the continuation of the good harvests in each area. The Flateyjarbók account further adds that many people performed blóts at the mounds until it was outlawed. In Þáttr Ólafs Geirstaða Alfs, Hálfdan's brother Olaf is buried in a howe upon death and during a famine, the people began performing blóts to bring plenty, and calling him Olaf Geirstad-Elf (Old Norse: Ólaf Geirstaða Álfr). Similar accounts in Ynglinga saga and Ólafs saga Tryggvasonar give a euhemeristic description of Freyr as a king of Sweden who was buried in a howe when he died and was subsequently worshipped and called a god.

The tradition of putting out gifts such as food and beer on mounds has survived into modern times throughout Northern Europe such as to the Orcadian hogboon or hog-boy, which derives its name from Old Norse: haugbui (howe-dweller), at Wayland's Smithy in England, and to elves in Sweden.

=== Sitting on mounds ===
A recurring motif in Old Norse literature is an otherworldly encounter connected with a male figure sitting on a howe, who is commonly a herdsman, such as the jötnar, as with Eggþér, Þrymr. Þorleifs þáttr jarlaskálds, from Flateyjarbók, describes how the shepherd Hallbjörn remembered a verse told to him in a dream by the dead skald Þorleifr as he slept on his howe, and was thereafter a great poet. The similarity has been further noted between this image and Gunnar Hámundarson singing from within his own howe in Njal's saga. Similarities have been noted with other Northern European cultures, such as the Welsh and Irish, in which howes are also a place to encounter and receive knowledge from the otherworld.

Sitting on a howe is also associated with rulership. In literary sources, sitting on mounds is linked to holding power and accordingly, King Hrollaugr descends from his seat upon a howe when he is vassalised by Harald Fairhair in Haralds saga hárfagra. Things were often held at sites with howes. In Sweden, some of these mounds have flattened tops, such as Injald's howe in Husby which dates to the Migration Period. It has been proposed that these served as platforms for public ceremonies. The howe sat upon is often said to be of a direct relative of the king such as of his wife, as in Hjálmðérs saga ok Ölvérs and Göngu-Hrólfs saga, or his father, as in Friðþjófs saga. Sitting on a dead ruler's howe is further recorded as a way to assert one's claim to the throne, as is described in Ólafs saga helga when the child Björn sits on the mound of his father to challenge the kingship of his uncle. The connection is also seen with producing a rightful heir in Völsunga saga in which it is upon a howe that King Rerir receives an apple from one of Frigg's maids in the form of a crow that allowed his wife to conceive Völsung. Again, these practices show similarities with those of Medieval Welsh culture.

== Raising the dead ==
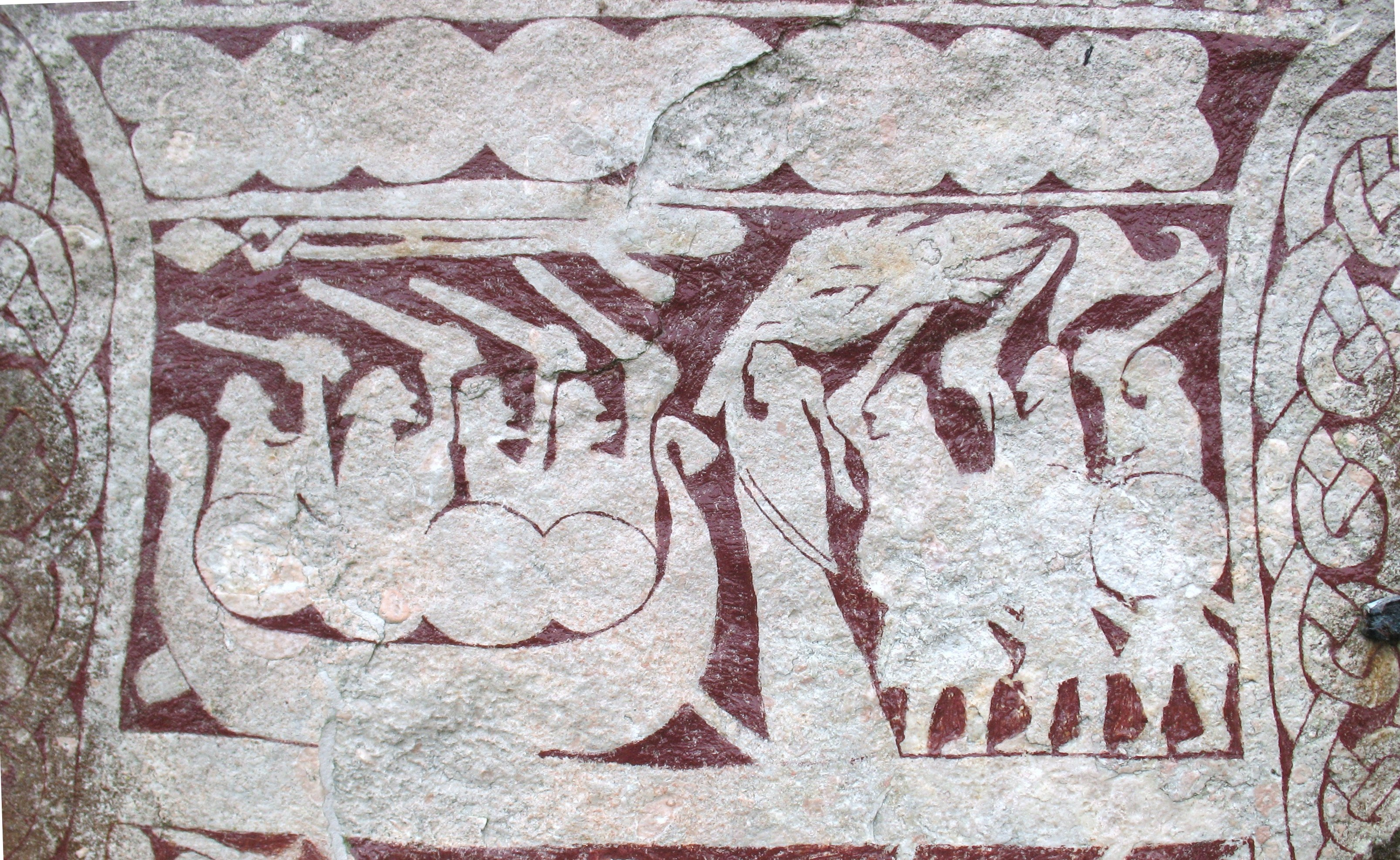
A detail from the Stora Hammars I stone, an image stone on Gotland

=== To obtain knowledge ===
In Hávamál, Odin when speaking of the spells he knows states:

Þat kann ek it tolfta:
ef ek sé á tré
uppi váfa virgilná,
svá ek ríst ok í rúnum fák,
at sá gengr gumi ok mælir við mik.

— Old Norse text
Translation:

I know a twelfth,
if I see in a tree
a hanged corpse dangle;
I cut and colour certain runes,
so that man walks and talks with me.

— Orchard Translation

This skill is used after the death of Mimir when Odin preserves his head and uses him as a source of hidden knowledge. He also raises the dead using a galdr in Baldrs draumar when he commands a völva to reveal why his son Baldr is having bad dreams, and so finds out that the god will soon die.

In Grógaldr, Svipdag goes to the howe of his dead mother and wakes her, whereupon she describes herself as having lain in the mould after leaving the world of the living. She then teaches him galdrar to protect him from danger, including the curse of a dead Christian woman, similar to the waking of Sigrdrífa in Sigrdrífumál

=== For battle ===
In Hrolfs saga kraka, the half-elf daughter of King Helgi, Skuld defeats Hrólf Kraki in battle by reanimating those who fall on her side as draugs, who are stronger than they were in life.

In some cases, both sides of the conflict are continuously revived, leading to a nearly everlasting battle. This can take place in the afterlife, most famously in Valhalla when the einherjar train for the coming conflict at Ragnarök. It is also seen in the journey of Hading to the land of the dead in Gesta Danorum between those who died in battle, and in the story of Thorstein Uxafotr from the Flateyjarbók, where the fight takes place in the grave.

In the telling of Hjaðningavíg in Skáldskaparmál, Hildr brings back to life each night the fighting armies on Hoy of her father and lover, while in the account in Sörla þáttr, Freyja is responsible for raising the dead. Many of these accounts show incorporation of Christian narrative elements to overcome this magic, such as intervention from Saint Olaf.

== Connection with sexual rites ==
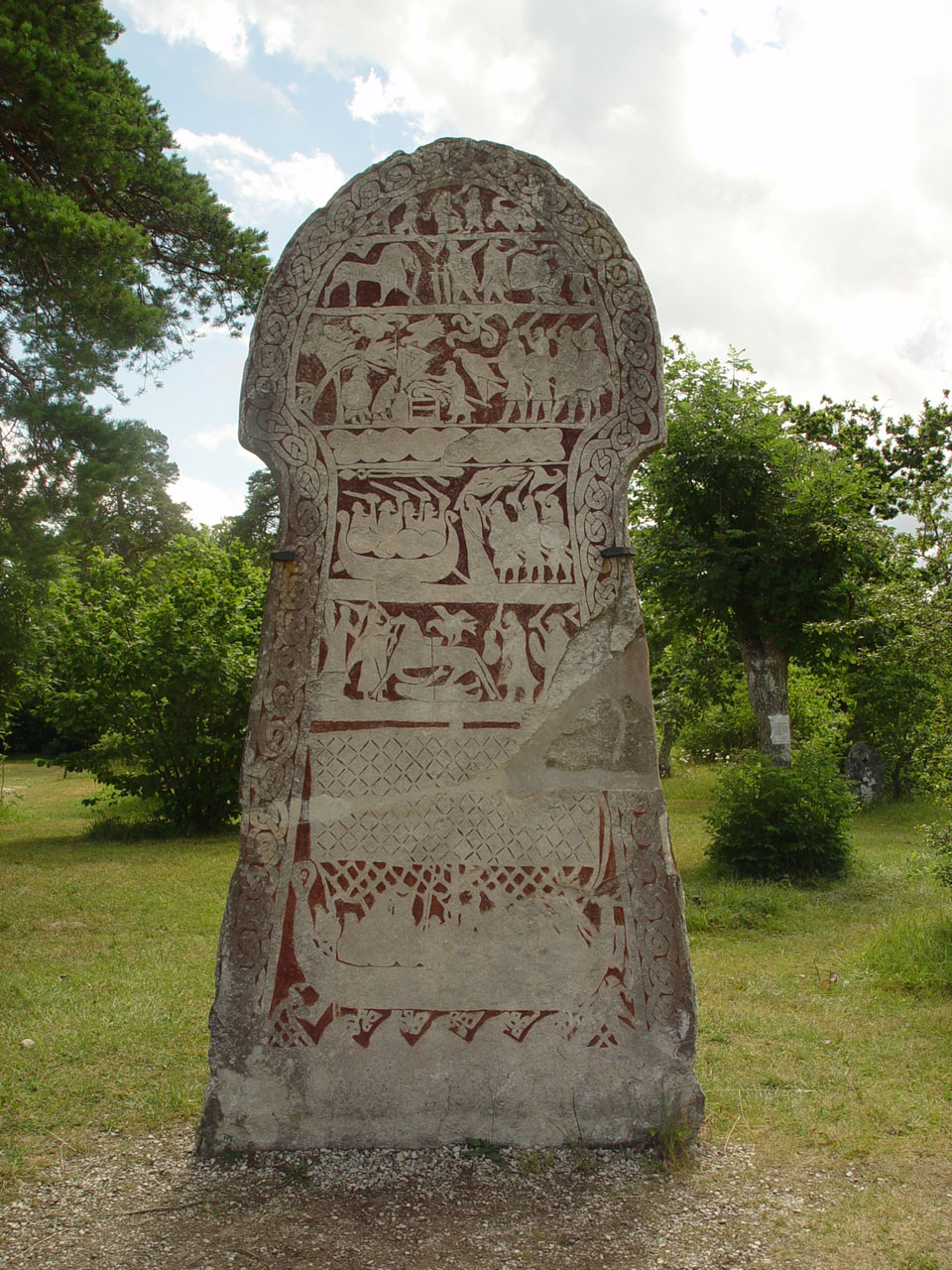
The phallic Stora Hammars I stone.

Early sources have an additional complex of beliefs which is connected with the afterlife: death could be described as an erotic embrace between the dead man and a lady who represents the afterlife. This lady was often Hel, but it could also be Rán who received those who died at sea. Rán's nine daughters are also depicted as erotic partners in death. There is good reason to believe that such erotic elements are not just skaldic playfulness, but authentic pagan notions, since they appear in the oldest known skaldic poems. In the 9th century poem Ynglingatal, the kings are said in several stanzas to be in "Hel's embrace". Several skaldic poems and sagas describe death in battle or on the sea with erotic terminology. The skald praises the brave sea warrior who fights in vain against the natural forces, but who finally has to give up, and then he enters Rán's bed or is embraced by her nine daughters.

Several of Gotland's 2 to 3 m tall phallic image stones, raised in remembrance of the dead, show scenes alluding to death and eroticism. The stones have richly decorated surfaces and they often in the upper field depict a welcoming scene in the realm of the dead between a man and a lady. The lady offers a drinking horn to the man who arrives on Sleipnir. It is the man's phallic shape, among other things, which has led scholars to connect the images to the literary sources. The scene could depict the deceased who is united with Hel or with Rán. It is primarily kings and chieftains who are portrayed with an erotic death, but also the death of a hero can be portrayed in the same way.

The connection between death and eroticism is probably ancient in Scandinavia, and to this testify numerous "white stones", great phallic stones that were raised on the barrows. The tradition goes back to the 5th century, and in total 40 such stones have been discovered, mostly on Norway's southwestern coast. It is possible that death required an extra portion of fertility and eroticism, but also that the living received life force from the dead. The thought might have been that life and death have the same origin, and if an individual died, the fertility and the future life of the ætt would be ensured.

Phallic stones from newer time are also found in church areas (where they are often white and have symbols from Christian time), like in Sandeid Church graveyard, two in the Bygland Municipality cemetery, three in Talgje Church graveyard, at least one at the Værøy Church and a lost stone from Ranem priest house mentioned by Gerhard Schøning. Some of the phallic stones called såsteinar were in use until 20th century during sowing in spring, when farmers smeared them with butter. There are known eight such stones in Telemark, one in Slidre and one in Arnafjord, but not all of them were certainly in modern use.

Another account of phallic stones connected to wedding rituals are pikksteinar, placed in so-called brudled rows made of menhirs and other stones in the mountains of Setesdal and Sirdal. Wedding processions going from farms nearby to a closest church were crossing mountains and passing the menhir rows and the phallic stones. There are known many such stone rows, but only few of them (ca. 15) have phallic stones. Some of the wedding paths are still in use per 2007.

Ibn Fadlan's eyewitness account of a Rus' funeral describes a slave girl who volunteered to be sacrificed. When the chieftain had been put in the ship, she went from tent to tent where she had sex with one man each time, who said to her to tell their deceased lord that they did it out of love for him. Lastly, she entered a tent that had been raised on the ship, and in it, six men had intercourse with her before she was strangled and stabbed. The sexual rites with the slave girl have led to the proposal that she was considered to be a vessel for the transmission of life force to the deceased chieftain. However, the choice to be sacrificed was offered to both males and females, and that single-sex, joint burials occur, such as with the Oseberg ship burial, suggesting that companionship was their main function; assumptions regarding gender roles complicate these interpretations where the rationale for the rites are not explicitly described.

== See also ==
- Neorxnawang
- Burial in Anglo-Saxon England
- Baltic Finnic paganism

== Bibliography ==
=== Primary ===
- Bellows, Henry Adam (2007). The poetic Edda : the heroic poems (Dover ed.). Mineola, NY: Dover Publications. ISBN 978-0486460215.
- Crawford, Jackson (2017). The Saga of the Volsungs with The Saga of Ragnar Lothbrok. Indianapolis, Indiana: Hackett Publishing Company, Inc. ISBN 978-1624666339.
- Crawford, Jackson (2021). Two sagas of mythical heroes : Hervor and Heidrek & Hrólf Kraki and his champions. Indianapolis, Indiana: Hackett Publishing Company, Inc. ISBN 978-1624669941.
- Dasent, George Webbe (2018). The Story of Burnt Njal: From the Icelandic of the Njals Saga. Franklin Classics Trade Press. ISBN 978-0343774431.
- Larrington, Caroline (1999). The Poetic Edda. Oxford University Press. ISBN 978-0192839466.
- Morris, William; Magnusson, Eirikr (2019). The Story of the Ere-Dwellers (Eyrbyggja Saga). Alpha Editions. ISBN 978-9353705411.
- Orchard, Andy (2011). The Elder Edda : a book of Viking lore. London: Penguin Books. ISBN 978-0141393728.
- Sturluson, Snorri (1995). Edda. Translated by Faulkes, Anthony. Everyman. ISBN 978-0460876162.
- Sturluson, Snorri (2012). The Prose Edda: Tales from Norse Mythology. Translated by Young, Jean. University of California Press. ISBN 978-0520273054.
- Thorpe, Benjamin (Trans.) (1907). The Elder Edda of Saemund Sigfusson. Norrœna Society.
- "Eyrbyggja saga". heimskringla.no.
- "Grímnismál".
- "Hávamál".
- "Hervarar saga ok Heiðreks". heimskringla.no.

=== Secondary ===
- Davidson, Hilda Ellis (1958). "Weland the Smith". Folklore. 69 (3): 145–59. doi:10.1080/0015587X.1958.9717140. JSTOR 1258855.
- Davidson, Hilda Ellis (1968). The Road to Hel. Praeger. ISBN 0837100704.
- Gunnell, Terry (2015). "Pantheon? What Pantheon? Concepts of a Family of Gods in Pre-Christian Scandinavian Religions". Scripta Islandica. 66. Isländska sällskapet.
- Harrison, Dick (2007). Vikingaliv. Stockholm: Natur och Kultur. ISBN 978-9127357259.
- Jarman, Cat (2021). River kings : a new history of Vikings from Scandinavia to the Silk Roads. London: Harper Collins Publishers. ISBN 978-0008353117.
- Kovárová, Lenka (2011). "The Swine in Old Nordic Religion and Worldview". Háskóla Íslands.
- Lindow, John (2002). Norse mythology : a guide to the Gods, heroes, rituals, and beliefs. Oxford: Oxford University Press. ISBN 0195153820.
- Muir, Tom (2014). Orkney folk tales. Stroud, Gloucestershire: History Press. ISBN 978-0752499055.
- Orchard, Andy (1997). Dictionary of Norse Myth and Legend. Cassell. ISBN 978-0304345205.
- Simek, Rudolf (2008). A Dictionary of Northern Mythology. Translated by Hall, Angela. BOYE6. ISBN 978-0859915137.
- Skar, Johannes (1907). Gamalt or Sætesdal, vol. 2.
- Skar, Johannes (1908). Gamalt or Sætesdal, vol. 3.
- Steinsland, Gro (1998). Människor och makter i vikingarnas värld. Stockholm: Ordfront. ISBN 9173245917.
- Tolkien, J. R. R. (1936). "Beowulf: The Monsters and the Critics". Proceedings of the British Academy. 22: 245–295.
- "sele". Wiktionary. 6 August 2022.
- "shag-boy". Wiktionary. 29 September 2019.
