= Sprite (folklore) =

Supernatural entity

Creature information
- Grouping: Legendary creature Pixie; Fairy

Origin
- First attested: In folklore
- Region: Europe

A sprite is a supernatural entity in European mythology. Sprites are often depicted as fairy-like creatures or as ethereal entities.

== Etymology ==
The word sprite is derived from the Latin spiritus ("spirit"), via the French esprit. Variations on the term include spright and the Celtic spriggan. The term is chiefly used with regard to elves and fairies in European folklore, and in modern English is rarely used in reference to spirits.

== Belief in sprites ==
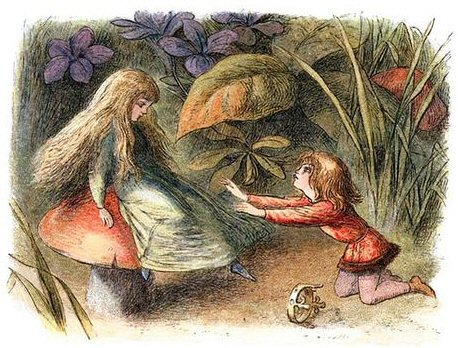
The prince thanking the Water sprite, from The Princess Nobody: A Tale of Fairyland (1884) by Andrew Lang (illustration by Richard Doyle)

The belief in diminutive beings such as sprites, elves, fairies, etc. has been common in many parts of the world, and might to some extent still be found within neo-spiritual and religious movements such as "neo-druidism" and Ásatrú.

In some elemental magics, the sprite is often believed to be an elemental of air (see also sylph).

== Water sprite ==
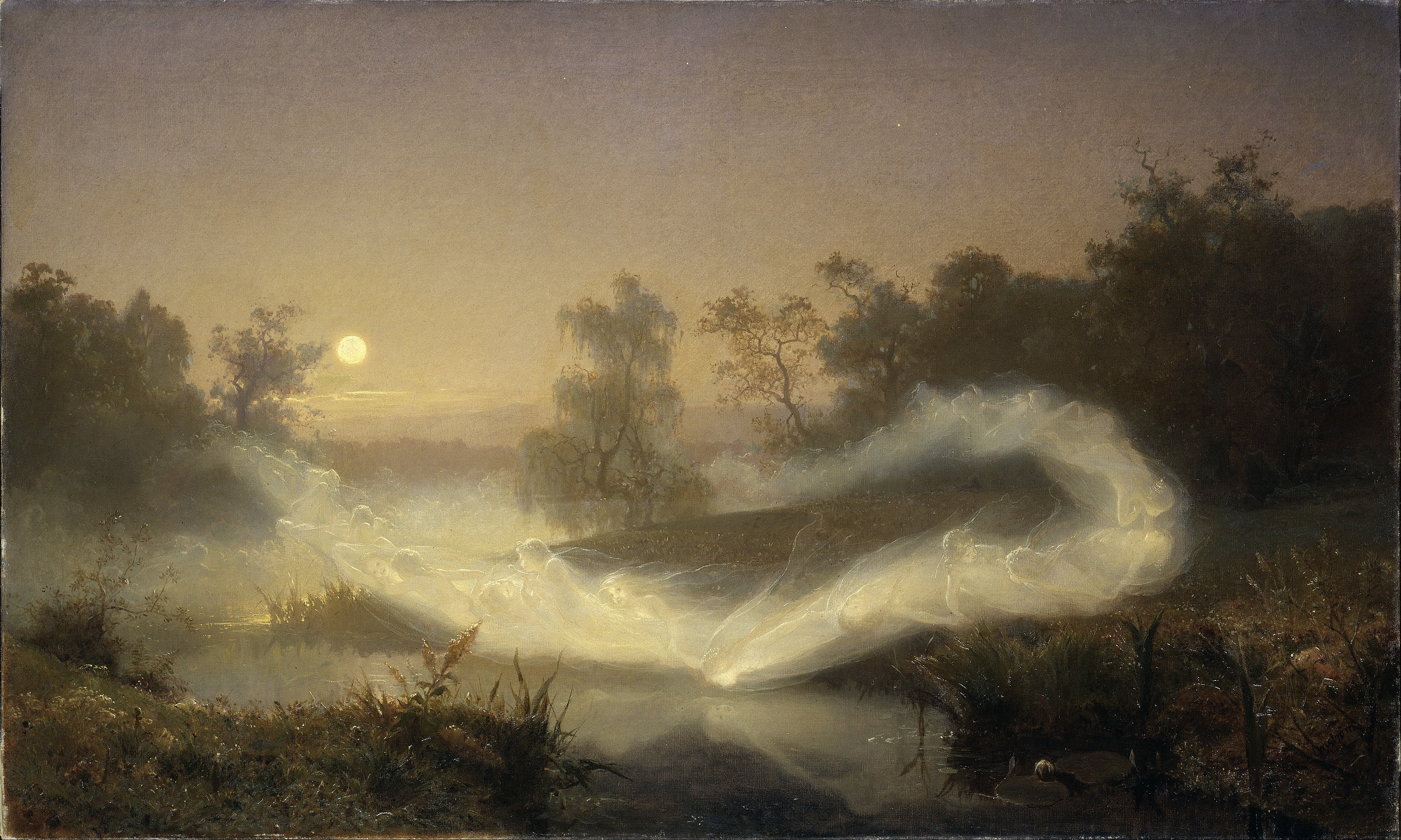
Dancing Fairies by the Swedish painter August Malmström

A water sprite (also called a water fairy or water faery) is a general term for an elemental spirit associated with water, according to alchemist Paracelsus. Water sprites are said to be able to breathe water or air and sometimes can fly.

These creatures exist in the mythology of various groups. Ancient Greeks knew water nymphs in several types such as naiads (or nyads), which were divine entities that tended to be fixed in one place and so differed from gods or physical creatures. Slavic mythology knows them as vilas.

Water sprites differ from corporeal beings, such as selkies, mermaids, and sirens, as they are not purely physical and are more akin to local deities than animals.
