= Nils Andersson =

Nils Andersson may refer to:

- Nils Andersson (footballer) (1887–1947), Swedish footballer
- Nils Andersson (ice hockey) (born 1991), Swedish ice hockey player
- Nils Andersson (painter) (1817–1865), Swedish painter
- Nils Andersson (swimmer) (1889–1973), Swedish swimmer
- Nils Johan Andersson (1821–1880), Swedish botanist and traveller
