= Regina Kylberg-Bobeck =

Swedish artist (1843–1913)

Regina Kylberg
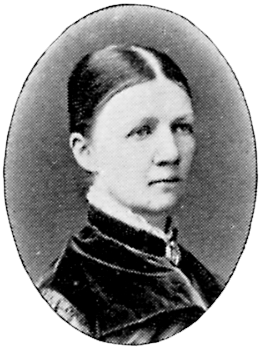
- Regina Kylberg
- Born: Regina Sofia Kylberg; 5 April 1843; Lidköping, Sweden
- Died: 17 November 1913 (aged 70); Lidköping, Sweden
- Occupation: Artist
- Father: Lars Wilhelm Kylberg

Regina Sofia Kylberg-Bobeck (5 April 1843 – 17 November 1913) was a Swedish artist. She was an avid plein air artist who is known for her watercolour paintings.

== Life ==
Born in Jämtland, Sweden, Regina Kylberg-Bobeck was the youngest of the 14 children. She grew up with her family in Såtenäs, in the province of Skaraborg. Her mother was Maria Elisabet (née Ahlborg), and her father, Lars Vilhelm Kylberg, was an accomplished artist who was well known for his paintings and parodies. Kylberg-Bobeck's interest in art began at a young age, which was mostly due to by her father's artistic influence on the family. Often, he would take the children out to the country-side and ask them to paint certain motifs. During her travels to Norway, 1868 and 1869, Kylberg-Bobeck began working with watercolours. According to one source, she was taught by Swedish landscape painter Per Daniel Holm, who was a professor at Royal Swedish Academy of Fine Arts, Stockholm, in the mid-1870s. However, no official records were found. Holm was an advocate of en plein air, and as his student, Kylberg-Bobeck gradually became an avid practitioner of open-air painting. In 1975, she participated in the Academy's exhibition, where one of watercolour compositions was featured.

In 1878, Kylberg-Bobeck travelled to Paris, where she completed watercolour sketches and spent time in museums – studying and practising the works of other artists. Between 1880 and 1883, she travelled to Italy with her sister Gabriella. During their stay in Rome, Kylberg-Bobeck focused on light figurative painting using watercolour. Working outside, she completed compositions of "ordinary" people engaged in everyday activities. Collections of her works during this period can be seen in the Västergötland Museum. Her paintings of this period apply plein air, and display the familiarity with Romanticism, indicating her tendencies towards peaceful, still landscape drawings with fresh watercolour palette. Her style was favourably received by critics and fellow contemporary artists, including Georg von Rosen.

At the age of 44, Kylberg-Bobeck married the clergy-man Karl Josef Bobeck in 1887. Even after marriage, she continued to make trips to Norway during the 1880s and 1890s. In 1903, she held a solo exhibition at the Sveriges allmänna konstförening (Swedish Art Society) in Stockholm where she displayed around 160 own works.

Kylberg-Bobeck died in Lidköping, on 17 November 1913.
