= Per Daniel Holm =

Swedish painter (1835–1903)

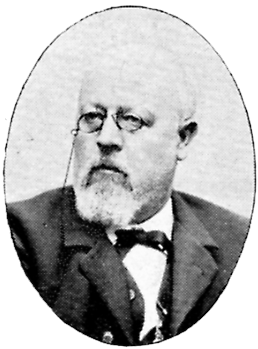
Per Daniel Holm; Svenskt Porträttgalleri XX

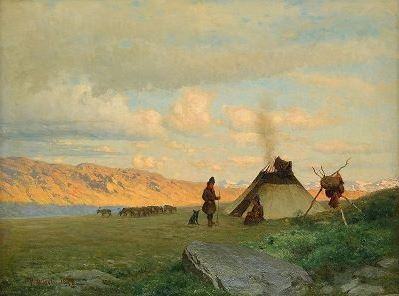
Landscape with Sami by Their Tent

Per Daniel Holm (11 September 1835, Smedjebacken - 7 August 1903, Stockholm) was a Swedish landscape painter.

== Biography ==
His father, Alexander Holm, was a pastor at Järnboås church. He attended the KTH Royal Institute of Technology until 1855, then became a mechanical draftsman for the Köping-Hults Railway, This was followed by a similar position at the zoological museum of the Royal Swedish Academy of Sciences.

From 1858 to 1863, he studied landscape painting at the Royal Swedish Academy of Fine Arts, with Nils Andersson, and made numerous study trips to northern Sweden and Norway. In 1862. he was awarded a royal medal for landscapes of Lapland.

He continued his studies in Düsseldorf, Munich, Karlsruhe and Paris. He was named a member of the Royal Academy in 1871, becoming a Vice-Professor of landscape painting in 1873, and a full Professor in 1881. That same year, he became a conservator at the Nationalmuseum. He resigned all of his positions in 1900.

He was especially appreciated for his depictions of geological formations. In addition to his paintings, he provided illustrations for Lappland, dess natur och folk, by Carl Anton Pettersson. He had a large collection of art and old books that was scattered after his death.

His works may be seen at the Nationalmuseum, the Göteborgs konstmuseum, the Stockholm City Museum and the Norrköpings konstmuseum.
