= Hermannus Torrentinus =

Belgian classicist

- Born: 1450; Zwolle
- Died: 1520 (aged 69–70); Zwolle

Hermannus Torrentinus (1450 – 1520) was a Dutch classicist, scholar, and translator of classical works.

== Biography ==
He was born in 1450 in Zwolle.

He died in 1520 in Zwolle.

He attended the Latin school in Deventer, Netherlands.

== Career ==
He taught rhetoric in Groningen and then became rector of the Latin school in Zwolle.

== Bibliography ==
He updated and published many classical works, particularly the Elucidarium.

He wrote multiple commentaries on classical authors such as Ovid and Virgil.

His commentary on the first part of the Doctrinale by Alexander de Villa Dei was much criticised by conservatives. He therefore wrote an Apologia, which is printed at the end of the third (the oldest known) edition.

== See also ==
- Elucidarium
- Zwolle
