= Gimlé =

Place in the Norse mythology

In Norse mythology, Gimlé (alternately Gimli as in Icelandic) is a place where the worthy survivors of Ragnarök are foretold to live. It is mentioned in the Prose Edda and the Eddic poem "Völuspá" and described as the most beautiful place in Asgard, more beautiful than the sun.

== Etymology ==
The etymology of Gimli is likely "the place protected from fire" based on two Old Nordic elements: gimr "fire" and hlé "protected place".

In scholar Lee M. Hollander's view it is more likely it means "gem-roof".

== Descriptions ==
Within Asgard, the realm of the gods, Gimlé is a golden-roofed building where righteous people go when they die. In the Prose Edda, Snorri Sturluson places it in Víðbláinn, which he describes as third heaven currently inhabited only by light elves. In "Völuspá", which he quotes in one of his accounts of Gimlé, the hall is on Gimlé, presumably a mountain, rather than being itself called Gimlé.

Snorri presents Gimlé as a pagan heaven. Scholars including Hollander and Rudolf Simek have seen the description of Gimlé as influenced by the Christian Heavenly Jerusalem. Ursula Dronke suggested that while the concept of a heaven in which "hosts" of the righteous lived together was based on the pagan Valhalla, the "Völuspá" poet or his associates invented the name "Gimlé" with reference to its protecting the blessed from the fires both of Surtr at Ragnarök and of the Christian Hell.

== See also ==
- Elysium
- Gimli, Manitoba
- Villa Grande, residence termed 'Gimlé' by Vidkun Quisling during the Nazi occupation.
- Gimli (Middle-earth)
