= Andlang =

Heavenly realm in Norse mythology

In Norse mythology, Andlang (also Ǫndlangr) is described as the second heavenly realm which stretches between the first, containing the halls of the gods, and the third, named Vídbláin. In all there are nine heavens according to Snorri. Andlang will serve as a shelter and dwelling place for the souls of the dead during and after the destruction of Ragnarök.

Holtsmark (1964) noted that Snorri's Andlang derived from andlegr himinn ("spiritual heaven") in the medieval Icelandic version of the Elucidarius, crediting Hjalmar Falk for this inspiration, adding her own insight that the and- heading made the term readily associable with andi "spirit" (Norwegian: ånd) which was in a way synonymous "elves," which fits in with the fact that Snorri describes light elves as denizens of the third heaven, Vídbláin. Rudolf Simek (1995), in similar line of inquiry, explores a functional connection between Andlang and the Coelus Spiritualis (the "spiritual heaven" in the original Latin version of the Elucidarius).

Other attempts at interpretation include "long-" or "far-breathing" (Magnusen 1828) and "limitless aether" (Weidenbach 1851), which identify the stem önd- "breath". It has also been glossed as "endlessly long" (Eduard 1843), consistent with the gloss "extended" or "very long" given in Anthony Faulkes's translation of the Prose Edda.
