= August Malmström =

Swedish artist (1829–1901)

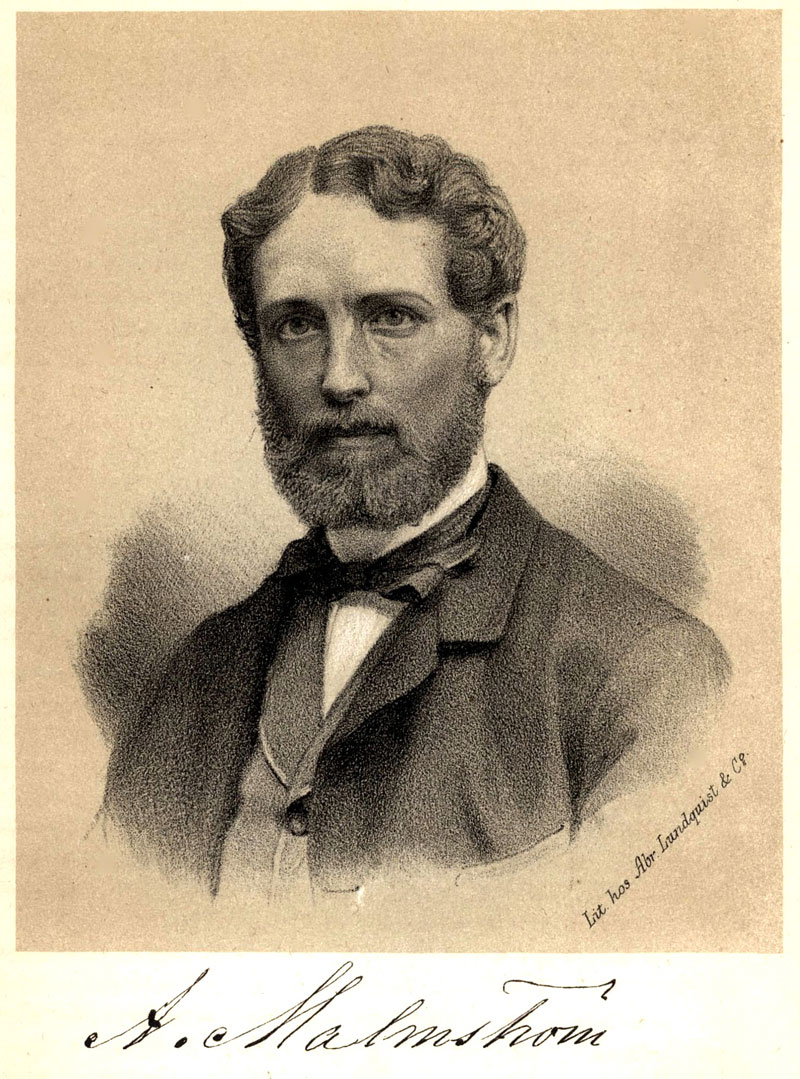
- Born: Johan August Malmström; 14 October 1829; Motala, Sweden
- Died: 18 October 1901; Stockholm, Sweden
- Education: Royal Swedish Academy of Arts, Stockholm
- Known for: Painting

Johan August Malmström (14 October 1829 – 18 October 1901) was a Swedish painter. As an artist, he was known for his country motifs often featuring children. His most widely recognized work is Grindslanten (1885) featuring a typical scene from 19th-century Sweden. Influenced by the national romanticism of Gothicismus, he also collected motifs from Norse mythology. He made illustrations for publications of both Frithiofs saga (Friðþjófs saga hins frœkna) and The Tales of Ensign Stål (Fänrik Ståls sägner).

Malmström was professor and later manager at the Royal Swedish Academy of Arts. Malmström also worked as an illustrator for several newspapers and book publishers. Additionally, Malmström designed furniture, worked as a pattern drawer and was a designer for Gustavsberg porcelain.

== Biography ==
=== Childhood and youth ===
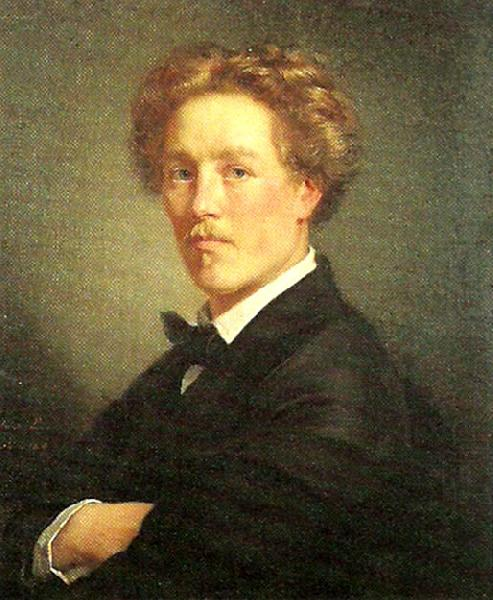
Portrait of August Malmström as a young artist, signed in Paris in 1859, by Wilhelmina Lagerholm (1826–1912)

Malmström was born at Nubbekullen in Västra Ny parish within the municipality of Motala in Östergötland County, Sweden. Nubbekullen (Nubbekullens hembygdsgård) is today the site of a local museum.

His father, Anders Gustaf Malmström, was a carpenter and ornamental sculptor who managed the small farm. August, together with his brother, helped his father with agriculture and woodwork. Among other works they made ornaments for altarpieces and pulpits to churches. Both parents encouraged August in his choice of life. His mother, Brita Stina Håkansdotter, was interested in literature, which evoked his interest in history. He showed early interest in drawing and painting. An injury in his right hand which never cured properly exempted him from hard work and gave him even more time to spend on arts. In his teens he was skilled enough to support his family, he made small paintings and coloured pictures which were given away as presents on birthdays and name days. His parents recognized his talent and sold their only ox to finance his studies in Stockholm.

=== Academy of Fine Arts in Stockholm ===
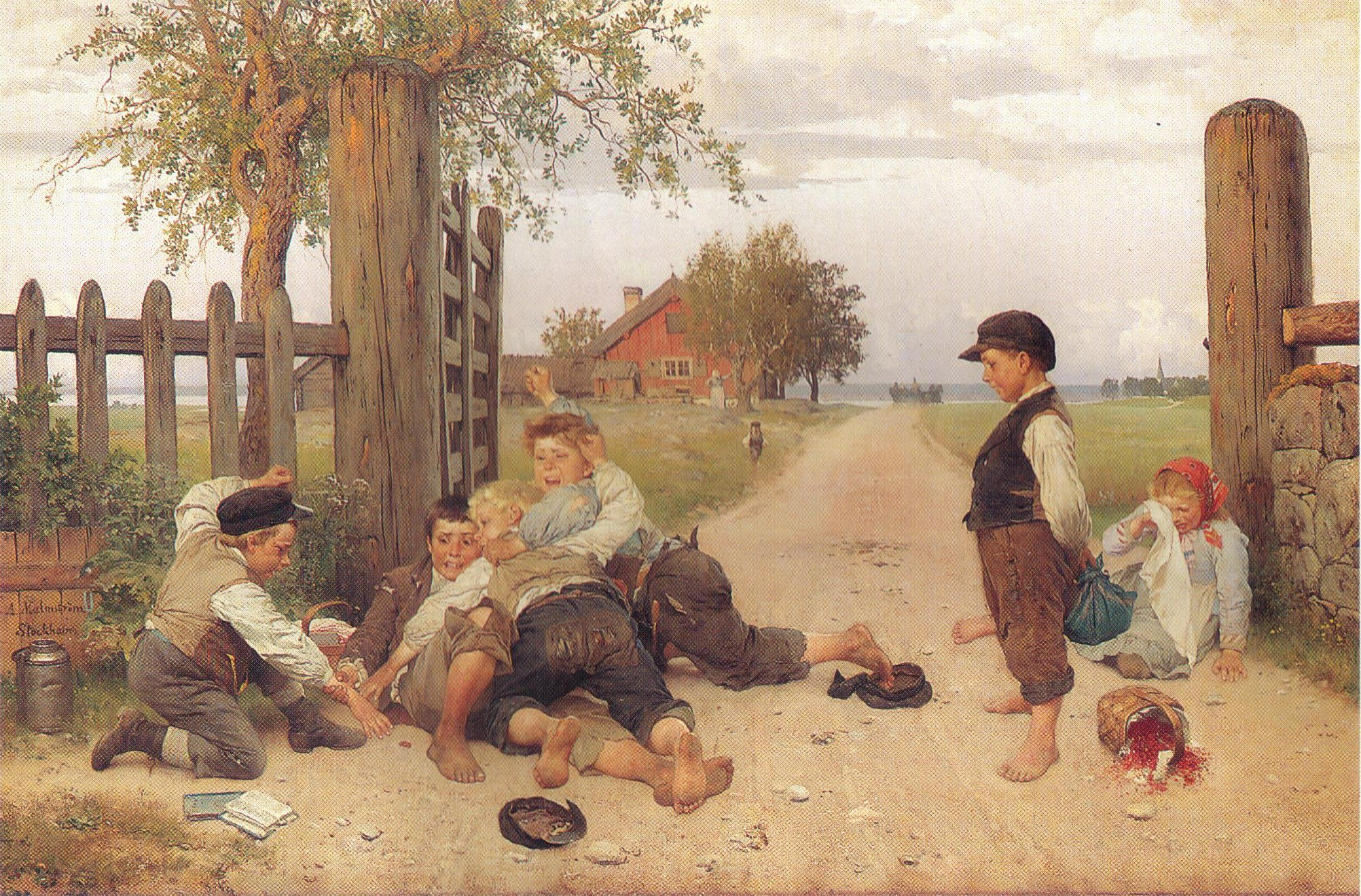
Grindslanten (1885)

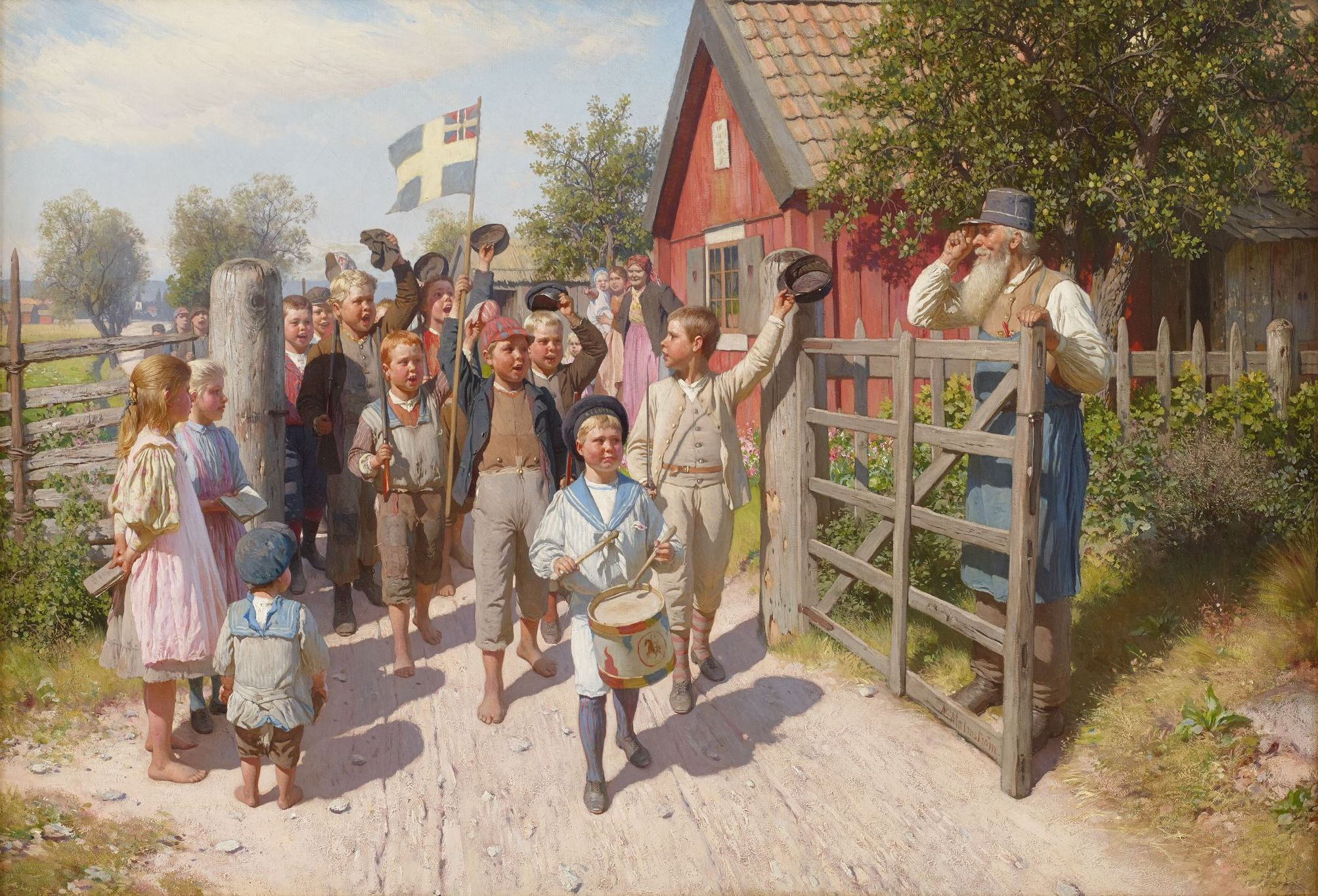
The Old and the Young Sweden (1894)

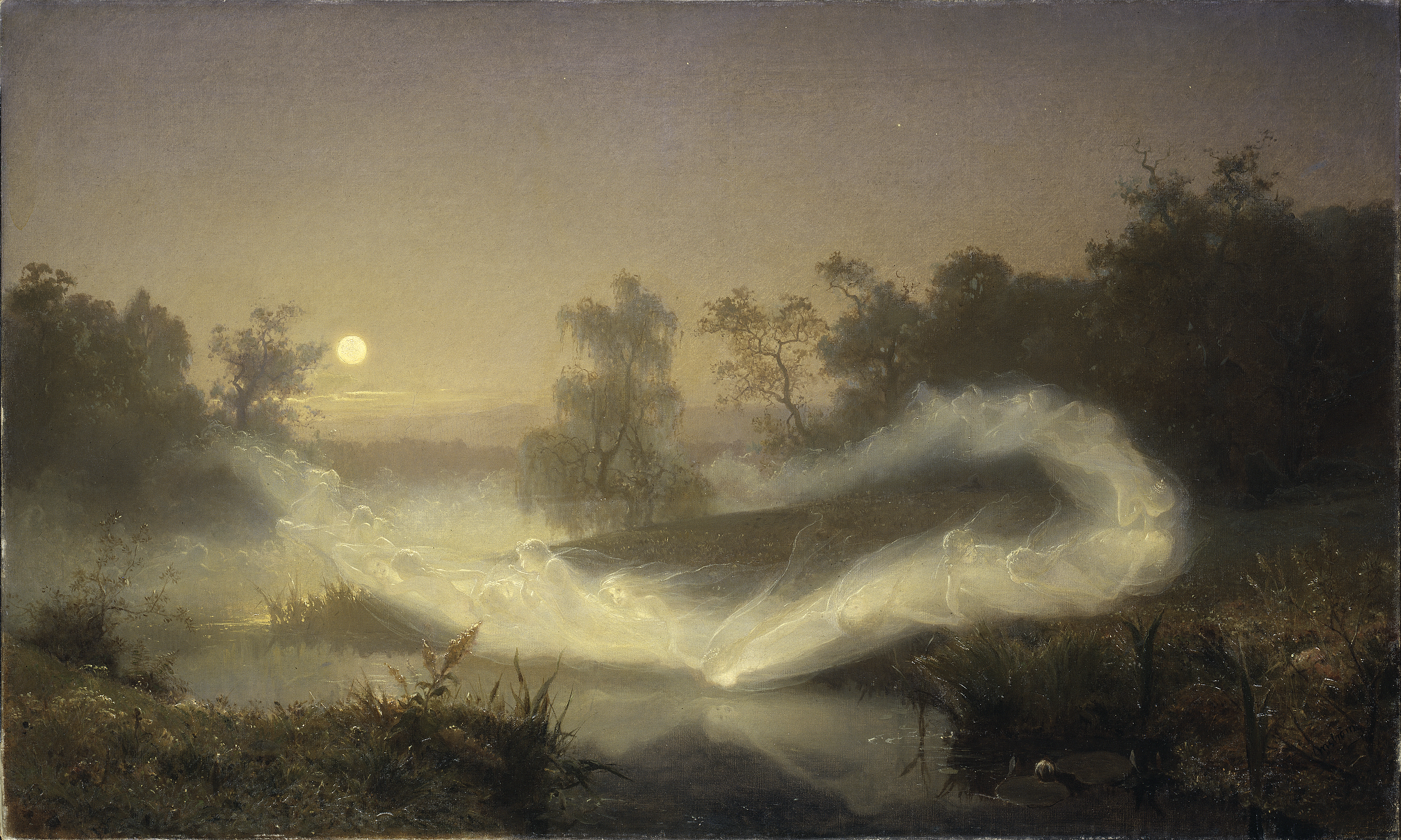
Dancing Fairies (1866)

Malmström came to Stockholm and applied for admission at the Royal Swedish Academy of Arts. It was first with the help of the painter Nils Andersson (1817-1865) that he managed to be accepted and thus on 3 November 1849 he was registered at the academy's ground school. Already at the beginning his talent attracted attention and his study period was marked by rewards of all sorts. The academy had painting contests every year with given themes and Malmström was probably the most diligent participant.

For the 1855 contest, he was the only student to submit a contribution with Konung Gustaf II Adolfs lifsfara i träffningen vid Wittsjö ("King Gustaf II Adolf in mortal danger at the battle of Wittsjö") . However, his work was "not in a good condition to be rewarded". A growing problem the academy faced was that more and more students left the academy for studies in Düsseldorf, a trend Malmström followed in 1856. He considered the academy's education as insufficient and at the same time his economic situation became gradually better. Besides scholarships and picture sales, he earned incomes from portrait orders and restoration tasks.

=== Düsseldorf 1856–1857 ===
Malmström is associated with the Düsseldorf school of painting. There exists no proofs that he took part in any education in the city. He presumably pursued studies on his own. During autumn 1856, he send home his first painting King Heimer and Aslög from Düsseldorf and during spring 1857 he then send home King Aella's messenger before Ragnar Lodbrok's sons. Both of these works impressed the Swedish Academy. During their exhibition, the painting King Heimer and Aslög was rewarded with the Royal Medal. This allowed the Academy to give Malmström a travel scholarship, on 2 October. The grant and several painting sales meant that he was financially secure for many years forward.

=== Paris 1857–1859 ===
In 1857, Malmström traveled together with Mårten Eskil Winge (1825–1896) to Paris. Winge was a good friend of Malmström and also had received a travel scholarship. Besides diligent studies at the museums, they were students of Thomas Couture (1815–1879) who had a solid reputation as a skillful teacher who taught a number of Swedish students. In 1856, Couture became an honorable member of the Royal Swedish Academy of Arts. Malmström returned 1858 to Düsseldorf to complete Vikingar på stranden ("Vikings at shore") together with the Norwegian painter Hans Fredrik Gude (1825–1903) but soon traveled back to Paris. Regulations for travel scholarships prescribed that a copy of a work by a great master should be made. The choice fell on Titian's painting Christ Crowned with Thorns, this because other works by Titian were already and constantly occupied by others, in some cases for many years.

=== Italy 1859–1860 ===
According to the instructions for both holders of the travel scholarship, the Academy stated that after a year of residence in Paris they should travel to Italy. After two years in Paris, Winge and Malmström went to Italy at the end of 1859. Much to his indignation, Malmström got a rejection to his application to copy Rafael's works at the Vatican. Instead he made copies of Rafael's and Titian's works in Palazzo Borghese. Malmström returned to Paris in 1860. In the summer of 1863, Malmström left Paris for a new visit to Italy to study.

=== Return to Sweden ===
His artistic breakthrough came in January 1864 after his return to Sweden. In 1866, he exhibited five works at the General Industrial Exposition of Stockholm (1866) (Stockholmsutställningen 1866). He was appointed an apprentice (agré) at the Royal Swedish Academy of Art in Stockholm. Subsequently, he was appointed professor of the Royal Swedish Academy of Arts in 1867 where he taught until 1894. He also served as manager there from 1887 to 1893. He died in 1901, and was buried in the cemetery at Solna Church (Solna kyrkogård) near Stockholm.

He bequeathed some 650 watercolours, drawings and 26 sketchbooks to the Nordic Museum on Djurgården.

== See also ==
- Düsseldorf school of painting

== Gallery ==
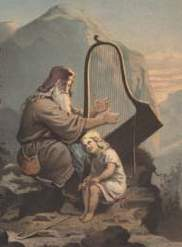
Aslaug (1850)

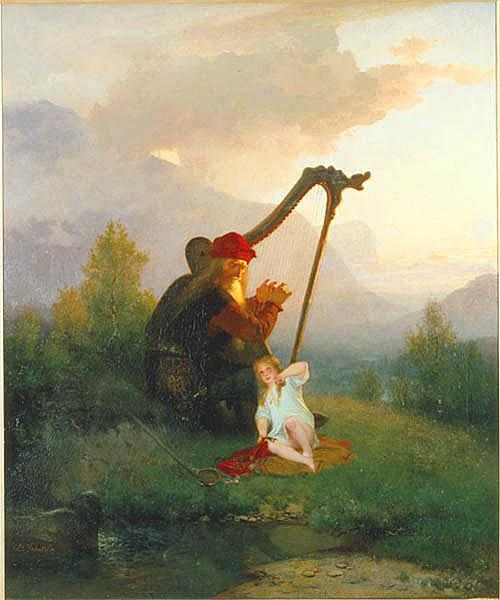
Kung Heimer och Aslög (1856)

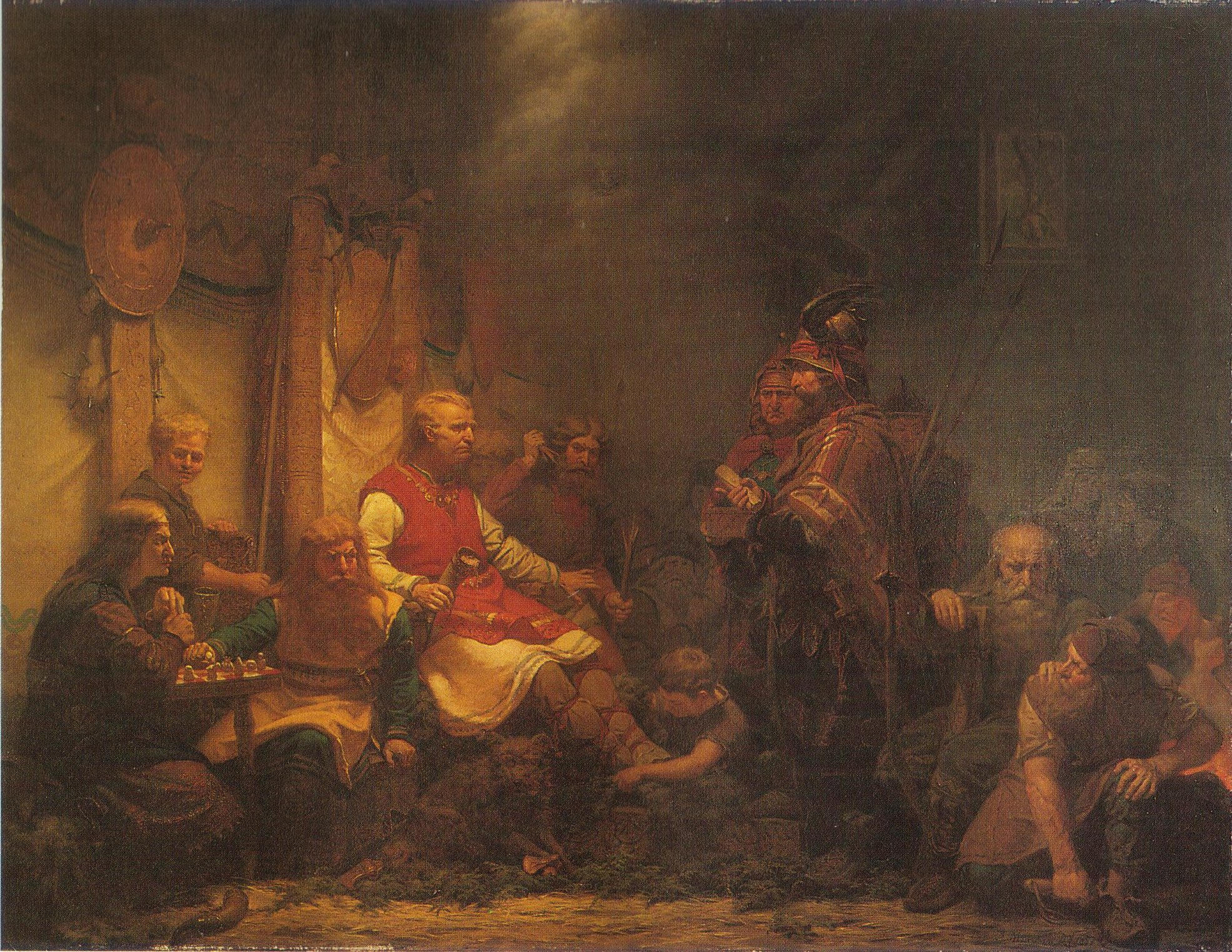
King Aella's messenger before Ragnar Lodbrok's sons (1857)

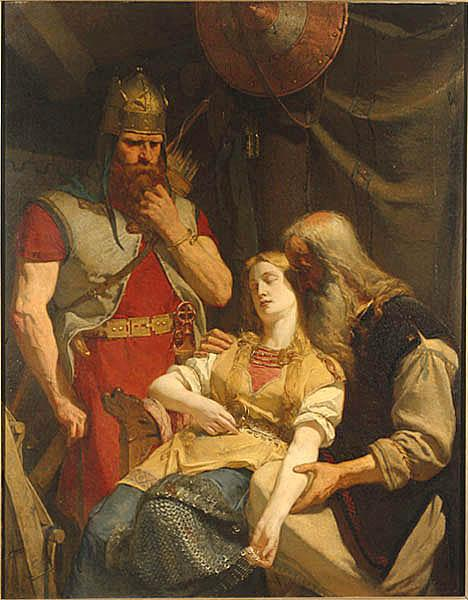
Orvar-Odd relates of Hjalmar's death (1859)

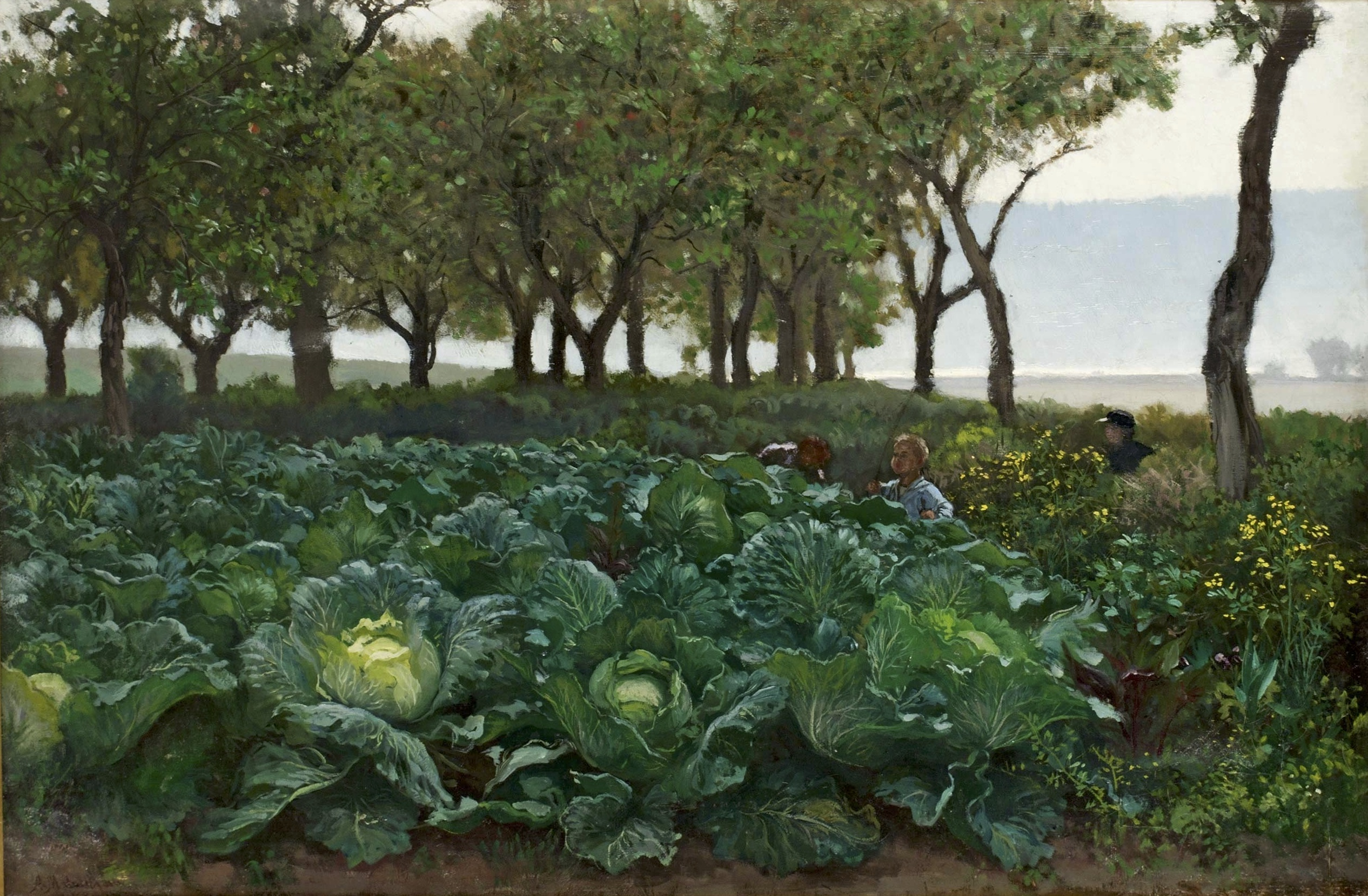
Children playing in garden (1866)

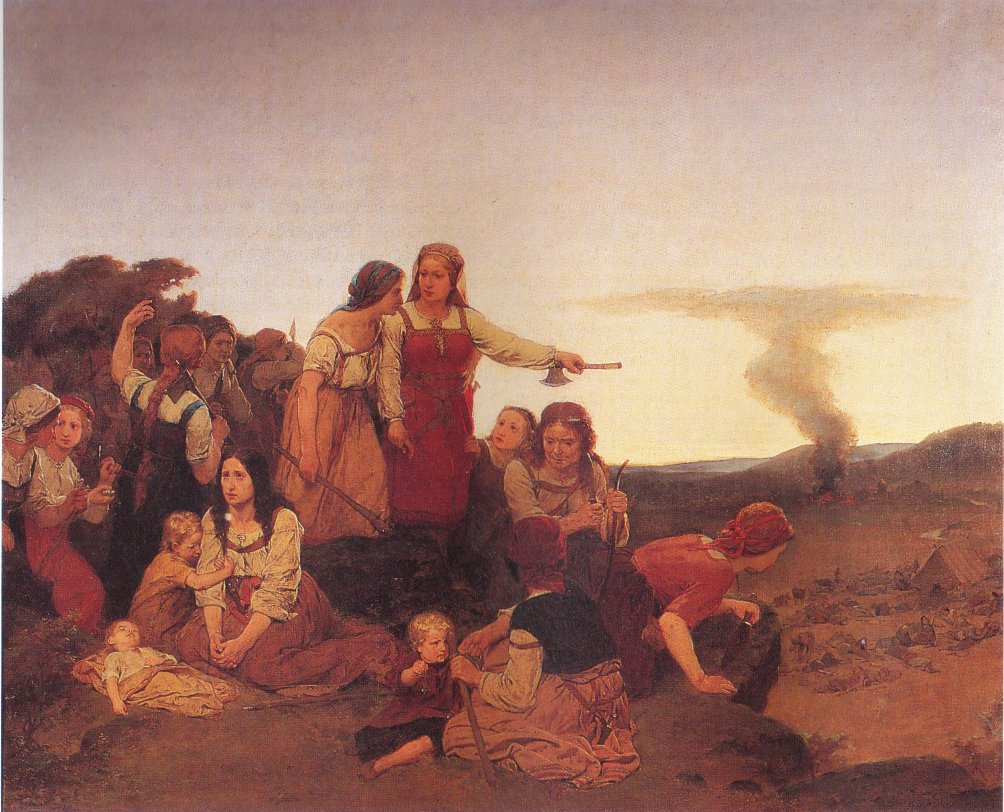
Blenda (1860)

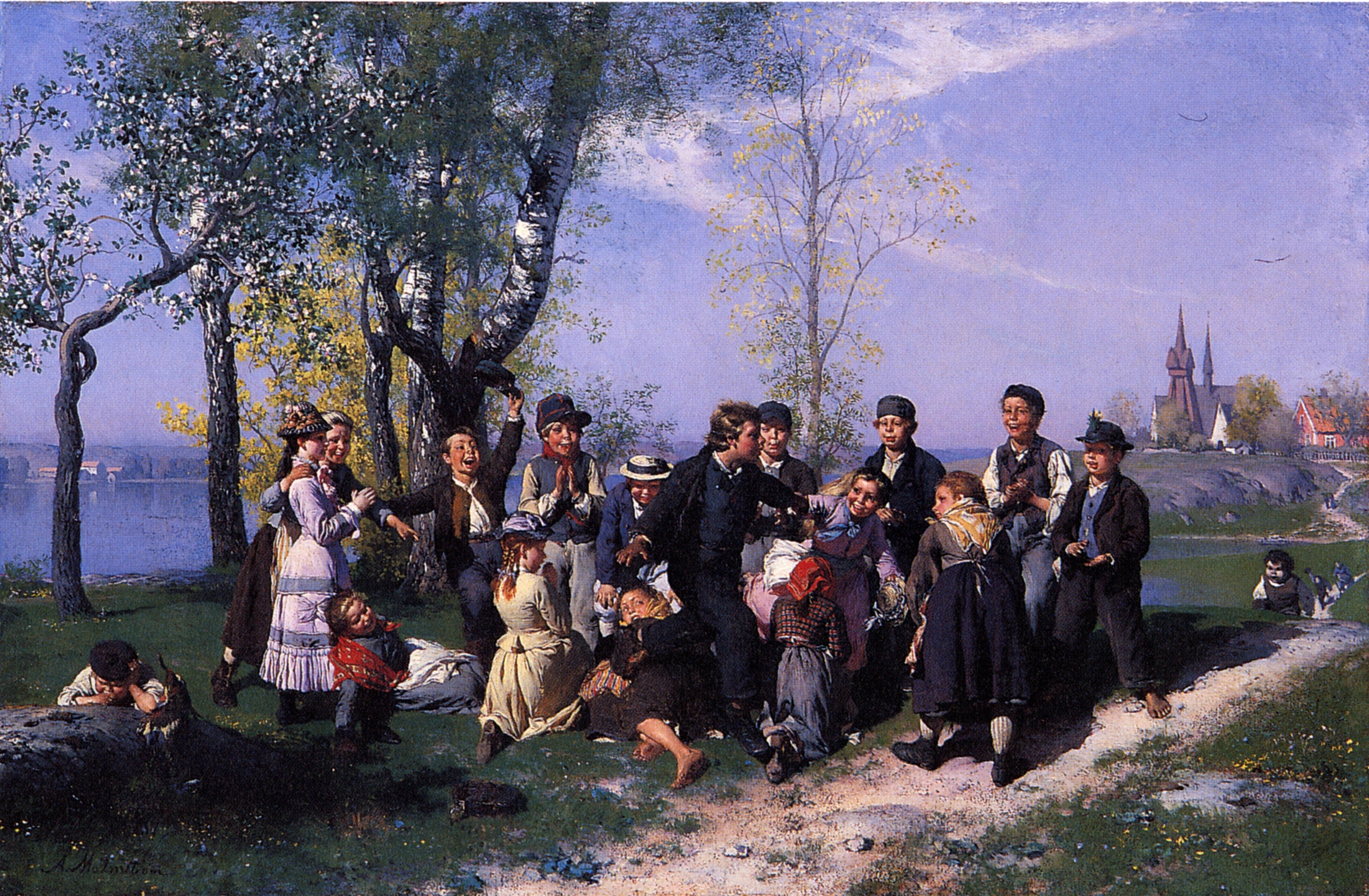
Traditional Swedish dance (1882)

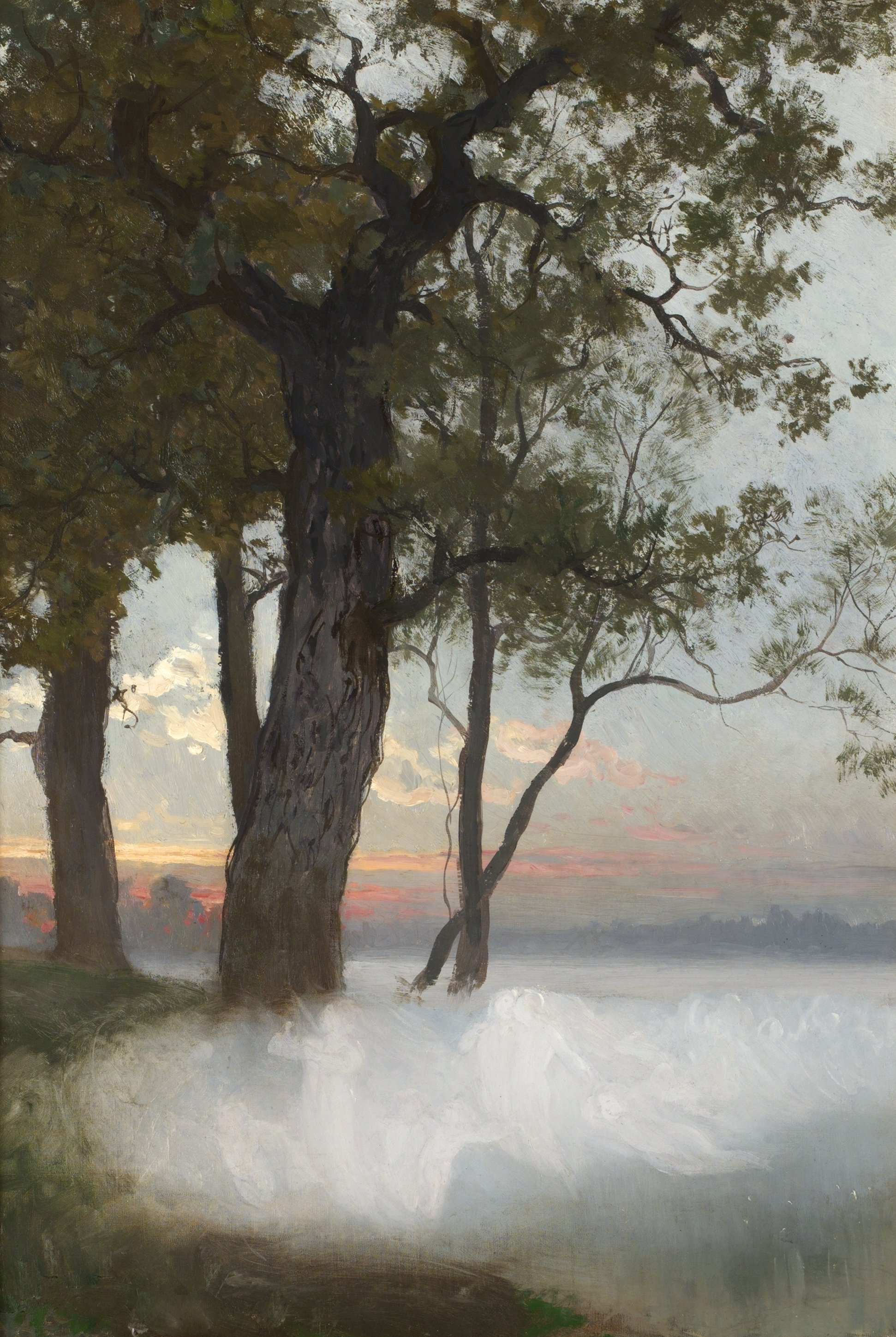
Älvaleken, a study for the Dancing Fairies

== Other sources ==
- Björk, Tomas (1997) August Malmström - Grindslantens målare och 1800-talets bildvärld (Nordiska Museets Förlag) ISBN 91-7108-416-9
- Facos, Michelle (1998) Nationalism and the Nordic Imagination: Swedish Art of the 1890s (University of California Press) ISBN 978-0520206267
