= Dancing Fairies =

1866 painting by August Malmström

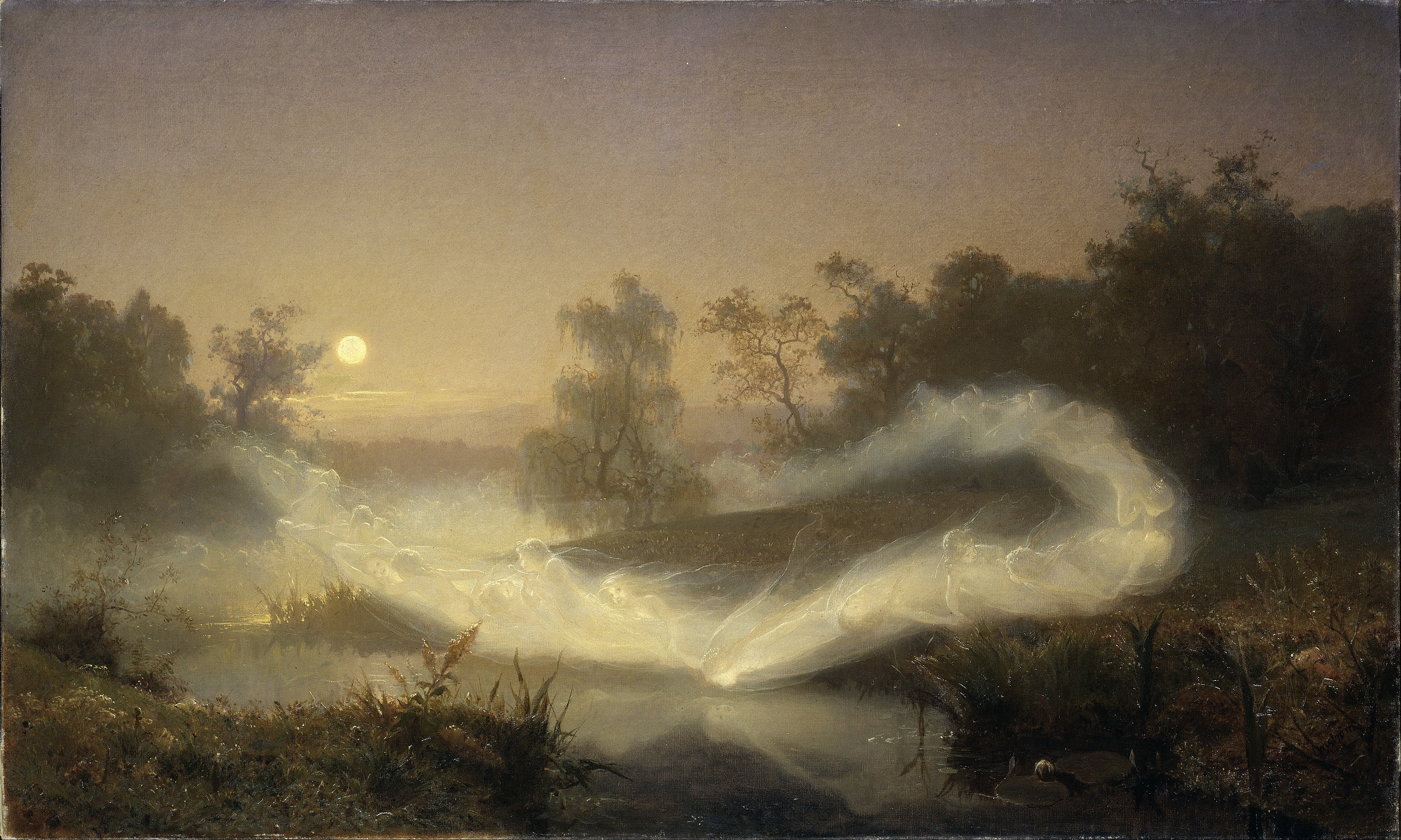
- Artist: August Malmström
- Year: 1866
- Medium: oil on canvas
- Dimensions: 90 cm × 149 cm (101 in × 89 in)
- Location: Swedish National Museum; Stockholm, Sweden

Dancing Fairies (Swedish: Älvalek) is a painting by the Swedish painter August Malmström (1829–1901). The painting depicts fairies dancing above the water, in a moonlit landscape.

== Painting ==
The fairies dancing in the meadow in the twilight flow over the romantic landscape; one of them bends over the water to catch a glimpse of her own image. This visionary painting depicts the morning mist turning into fairies, like the spirits of untamed nature. Fairies were seen as delicate, tender, sensitive but also capricious and inclined to have their feelings hurt easily and take offence if not treated well. In the Swedish folk tradition, people were warned to watch out for elves, as they could be dangerous for those who were not careful with them. The fairies in Norse mythology's hidden people have survived in local folklore often as beautiful young women, living in the wild on hills, woods and mounds of stones. In Romantic art and literature, elves are typically pictured as fair-haired, white-clad, and nasty when offended.

In order to protect themselves and their livestock against malevolent elves, Scandinavians could use an Älvkors (Elf cross), which was carved into buildings or other objects.

== Painter ==
August Malmström's Dancing Fairies is a widely recognised work in its home country. Malmström, who was a professor at the Royal Swedish Academy of Arts, was one of the Swedish artists who aspired to create a national Swedish art. He used themes both from Norse mythology and folklore, and his images often depicted fairies and other spirits of nature.

== See also ==
- Hidden people (Icelandic)
