= Nils Andersson (painter) =

Swedish painter

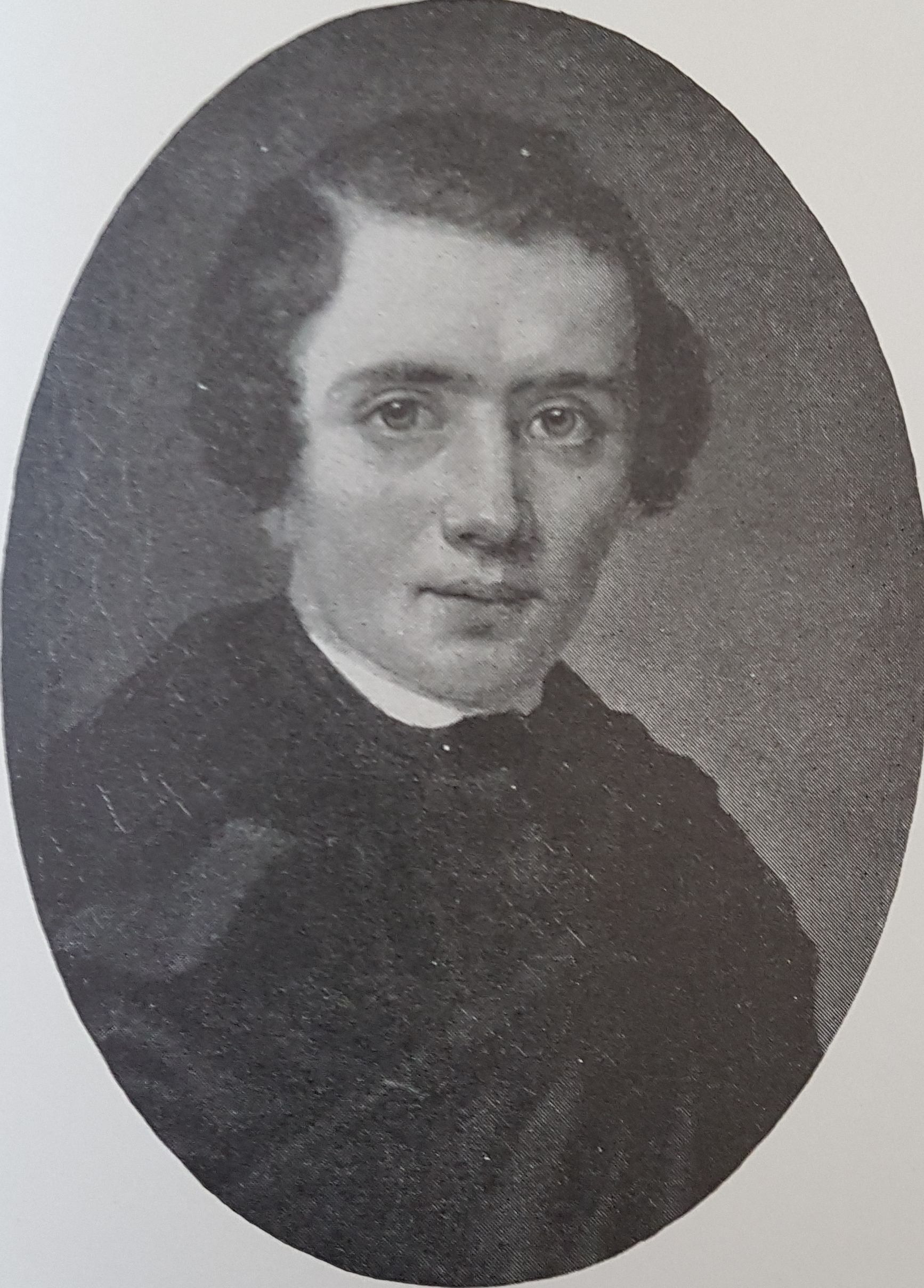
Nils Andersson self-portrait

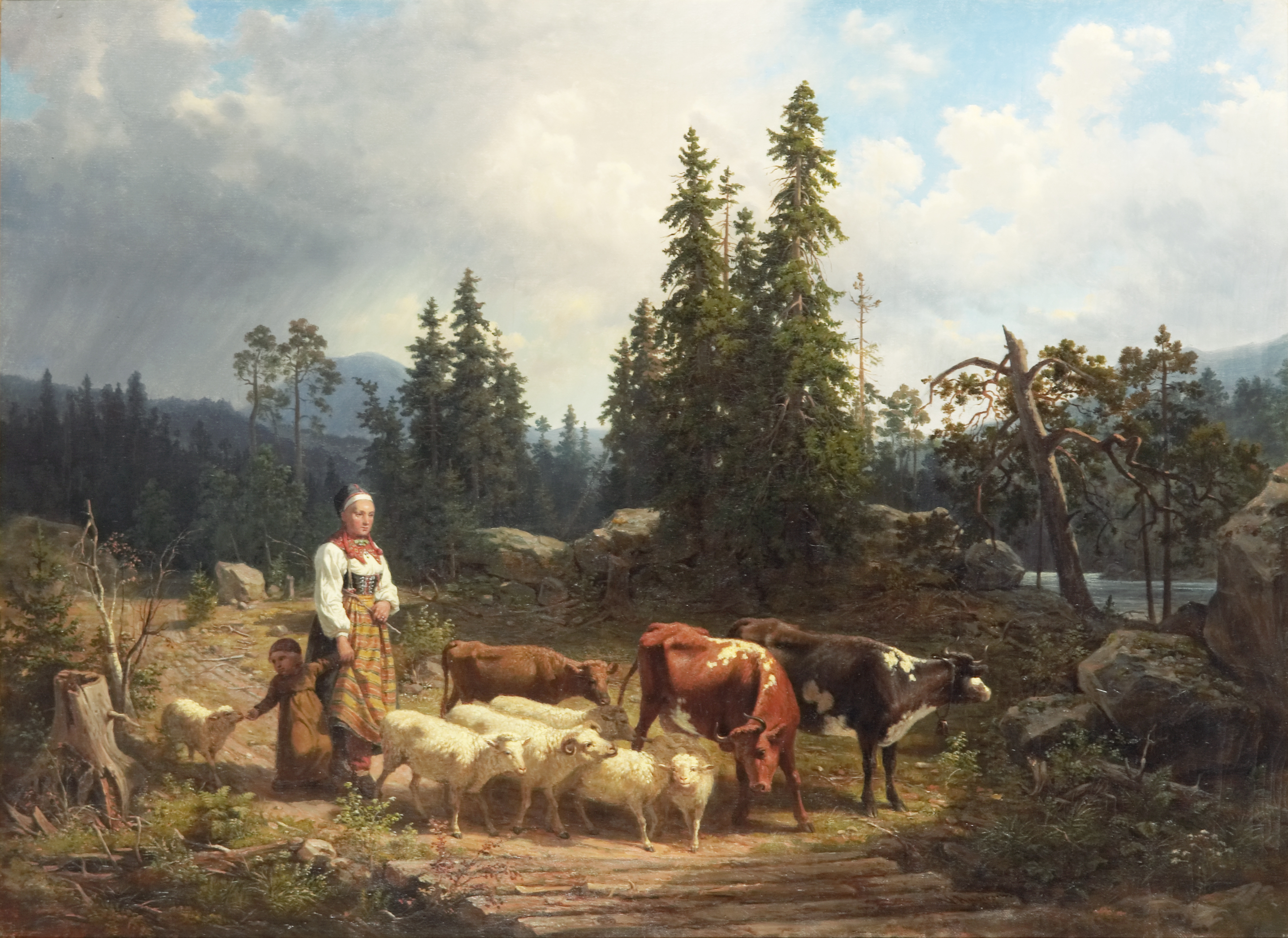
Goatherd with herd and landscape, painting from 1854.

Nils Andresson (1817–1865), was a Swedish painter, who was born in East Gothland, in 1817, was the son of a peasant. After he had received a course of instruction in Stockholm, he travelled through Europe, and went in 1854 to Paris, where he stayed for two years, and studied under Couture. On his return to Stockholm, he was made a member of the Academy, and in 1858 a professor. He died at Vaxholm, near Stockholm, in 1865. He painted historical pieces, pictures of genre subjects, and landscapes with animals. Good examples of his work are in the National Museum at Stockholm.
