= Víðbláinn =

Third heaven in Norse mythology

In Norse mythology, Víðbláinn ("Wind-Blue" or "Far-Blue", combination of víð and bla) is the third heaven in the cosmology of Snorri's Gylfaginning, located above Andlang and Asgard. It will serve as a shelter and dwelling place for the souls of the dead during and after the destruction of Ragnarök.

== Primary Source ==
- Lindow, John (2002) Norse Mythology: A Guide to Gods, Heroes, Rituals, and Beliefs (Oxford University Press) ISBN 978-0195153828

== Related reading ==
- Orchard, Andy (1997) Dictionary of Norse Myth and Legend (Cassell) ISBN 0-304-34520-2
- Simek, Rudolf translated by Angela Hall (2007) Dictionary of Northern Mythology (D.S. Brewer) ISBN 0-85991-513-1
