= Eddica minora =

German-language book of Eddic poetry

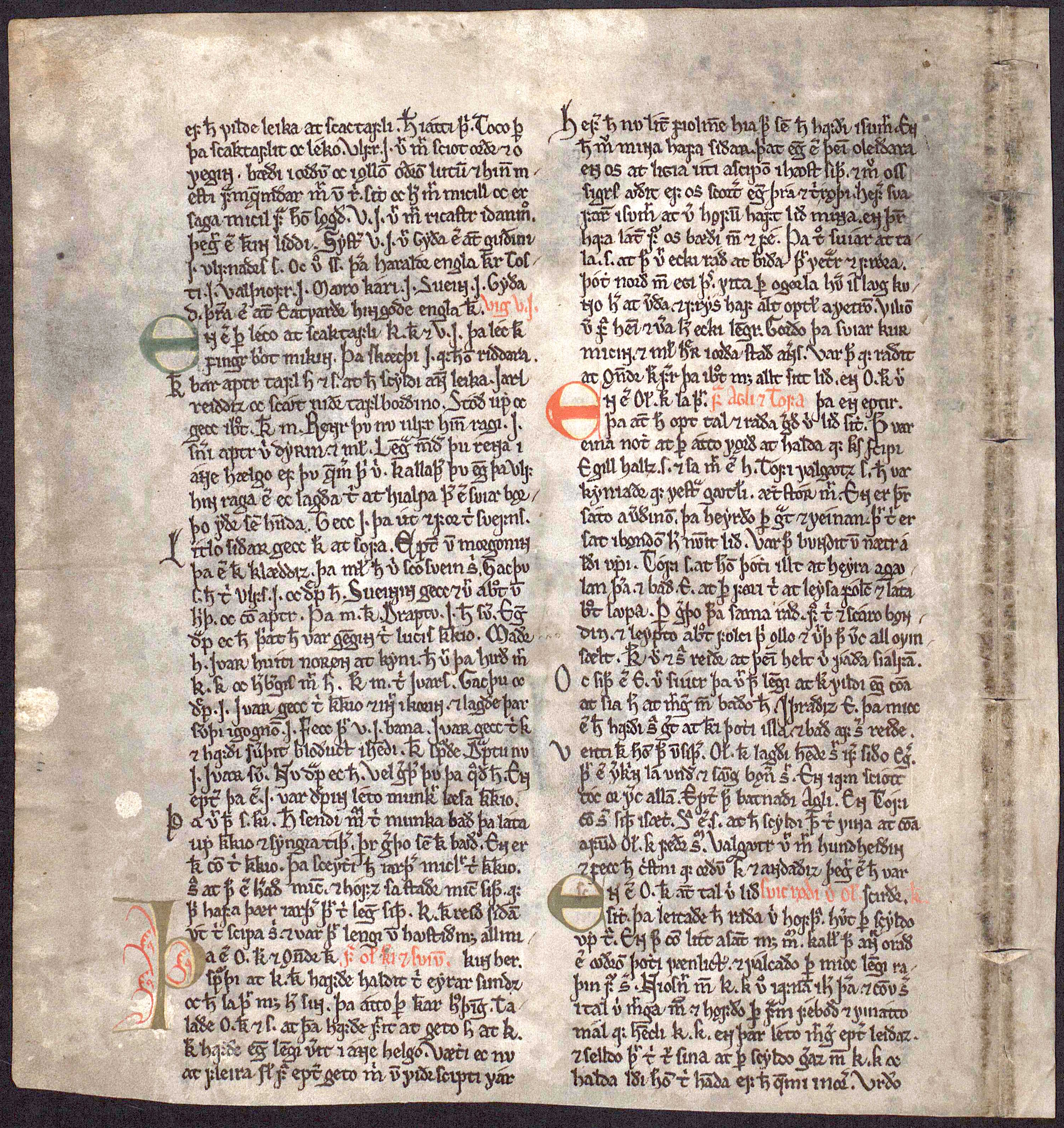
Kringlublaðið from the Kringla Manuscript

Eddica minor. Dichtungen eddischer Art aus den Fornaldarsögur und anderen Prosawerken. ("The Lesser Edda. Poems of Eddic type from the Fornaldarsögur and Other Prose Works.") is a German-language book of Eddic poetry compiled by Andreas Heusler and Wilhelm Ranisch in 1903. Unlike the Eddic poetry published in the Poetic Edda (whose main source is the Codex Regius), the poems in Eddica minora were extracted by the authors mostly from the Legendary sagas.

The first 110 pages of the book contains detailed introductions to each poem, including its manuscripts. The second half of the book contains transcriptions of the ancient poems.

== List of poems ==
- Das Lied Von Der Hunnenschlacht (from the Saga of Hervör and Heidrek)
- Das Hervǫrlied (from the Saga of Hervör and Heidrek)
- Die Biarkamál
- Das Innsteinslied (from the Saga of Half and His Heroes)
- Der Víkarsbálkr (from Gautrek's Saga)
- Das Hrókslied (from the Saga of Half and His Heroes)
- Hiálmars Sterbelied (from Örvar-Oddr's Saga and the Saga of Hervör and Heidrek)
- Hildibrands Sterbelied (from Ásmundar saga kappabana)
- Ǫrvar-Odds Sterbelied (from Örvar-Oddr's Saga)
- Das Valkyrjenlied (from Njál's saga)
- Kleinere Bruchstücke
  - Aus der Vaterrache der Hálfdanssöhne
  - Aus dem Kampf auf Sámsey
  - Aus der Heiðrekssaga
  - Aus Einem Starkaðliede
- Ǫrvar-Odds Männervergleich (from Örvar-Oddr's Saga)
- Útsteins Kampfstrophen (from the Saga of Half and His Heroes)
- Ǫrvar-Oddr in Biálkaland (from Örvar-Oddr's Saga)
- Scheltgespräche Ketils und Gríms (from the Saga of Ketil Trout and the Saga of Grim Shaggy-Cheek)
  - Ketill und Gusir
  - Ketill und die Hexe
  - Ketill und Framarr
  - Grímr und die Hexen
- Ásmundr auf der Hochzeit (from Ásmundar saga kappabana)
- Hervǫr bei Jarl Biartmarr (from the Saga of Hervör and Heidrek)
- Lausavísur
  - Weissagestrophen aus der Hálfssaga (from the Saga of Half and His Heroes)
    - Víkars Schicksal
    - Hiǫrleifr enn kvennsami
  - Weissagestrophen aus der Ǫrvar-Oddssaga (from Örvar-Oddr's Saga)
  - Strophe des Haugbúi aus der Hálfssaga (from the Saga of Half and His Heroes)
  - Die Strophen des Trémaðr aus der Ragnarssaga (from the Tale of Ragnar Lodbrok)
  - Besprechung eines Trolls
    - in der Hálfssaga (from the Saga of Half and His Heroes)
    - in der Ketilssaga (from the Saga of Ketil Trout)
  - Strophen aus der Ketils- und der Grímssaga (from the Saga of Ketil Trout and the Saga of Grim Shaggy-Cheek)
  - Strophe des Refr aus der Gautrekssaga (from Gautrek's Saga)
  - Spottstrophen des Án bogsveigir
  - Strophen der Friðþiófssaga (from Frithiof's Saga)
- Ein Danz (from the Saga of Án the bow-bender)
- Katalogstrophen
  - Königskatalog. Aus der Hervararsaga
  - Die Arngrímssöhne. Aus der Ǫrvar-Oddssaga
- Die Heiðreks Gátur (from the Saga of Hervör and Heidrek)
- Die Geizhalsstrophen (from Gautrek's Saga)
- Die Vǫlsistrophen (from Völsa þáttr in Flateyjarbók)
- Die Buslubœn (from Bósa saga ok Herrauðs)
- Die Tryggðamál (from the Gray Goose Laws, Grettis saga and Heiðarvíga saga)
