= Hålogaland =

District of Norway

Coordinates: 67°N 14°E

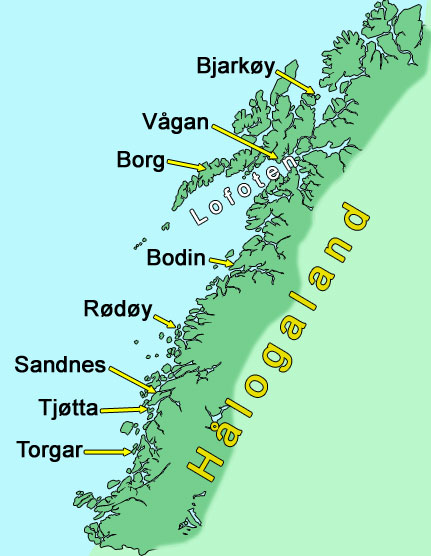
Hålogaland around 1000 CE

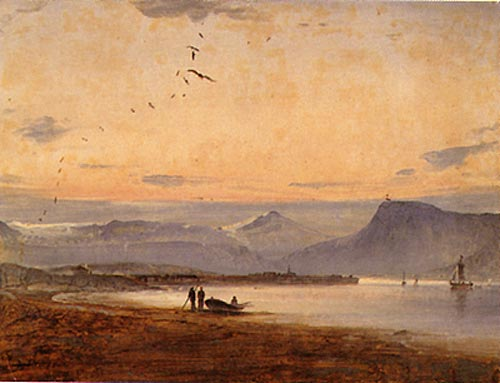
Tromsø, by Peder Balke The painting illustrates the rugged fjords and island terrain in Hålogaland.

Hålogaland was the northernmost of the Norwegian provinces in the medieval Norse sagas. In the early Viking Age, before Harald Fairhair, Hålogaland was a kingdom extending between the Namdalen valley in Trøndelag county and the Lyngen fjord in Troms county.

== Etymology and history ==
Ancient Norwegians said that Hálogaland was named after a royal named Hǫlgi. The Norse form of the name was Hálogaland. The first element of the word is the genitive plural of háleygr, a 'person from Hålogaland'. The last element is land, as in 'land' or 'region'. The meaning of the demonym háleygr is unknown. Thorstein Vikingson's Saga, 1, describes it as a compound of Hial, "Hel" or "spirit," and "loge", "fire" – although this is largely discredited.

The Gothic historian Jordanes in his work De origine actibusque Getarum (also known as Getica), written in Constantinople c. AD 551, mentions a people "Adogit" living in the far North. This could be an old form of háleygir and a possible reference to the petty kingdom of Hålogaland. Alex Woolf links the name Hålogaland to the aurora borealis — the "Northern Lights" —, saying that Hålogaland meant the "Land of the High Fire", loga deriving from logi, which refers to fire. This is also discredited.

A legendary interpretation is found in the medieval accounts of Ynglingatal and Skáldskaparmál; "Logi" is described as the personification of fire, a fire giant, and as a "son of Fornjót". In the medieval Orkneyinga saga and the account of Hversu Noregr byggðist ('How Norway was inhabited'), Fornjót is described as king of "Gotland, Kænland and Finnland". The royal lineages of his children are discussed in these and other medieval accounts. The beginning of the Þorsteins saga Víkingssonar ("Saga of Thorstein son of Víking") discusses King Logi, who ruled the country north of Norway. Because Logi was larger and stronger than any other man in land, his name was lengthened from Logi to Hálogi, meaning "High-Logi". Derived from that name his country became called Hálogaland, meaning "Hálogi's land". The spelling of the name changed to modern-day Hålogaland. Another interpretation of the name is presented by Halvdan Koht and Alfred Jacobsen (in Håløyminne 1, 1920): 'Háleygr' is derived from Proto-Scandinavian *HaÞulaikaR, with the elements *haÞu 'battle' and *laik- 'pledge', i.e., a wartime alliance of the many settlements in times of conflict.

The Hversu Noregr byggðist is a legendary account of the origin of various legendary Norwegian lineages. It traces the descendants of the primeval ruler Fornjót (Fornjotr) down to Nór, who unites the Norwegian lands. The Hversu account then gives details of the descendants of Nór and of his brother Gór in the following section known as the Ættartölur ("Genealogies", or Fundinn Noregr, "Founding of Norway"). The Hversu account is closely paralleled by the opening of the Orkneyinga saga.

In 873 AD, according to the Egil's saga (written c. 1240) the Kvens and Norse cooperate in battling against the invading Karelians. The chapter XVII of Egil's saga describes how Thorolf Kveldulfsson (King of Norway's tax chief starting 872 AD) from Namdalen, located in the southernmost tip of the historic Hålogaland, goes to Kvenland again:

That same winter Thorolf went up on the fell with a hundred men; he passed on at once eastwards to Kvenland and met King Faravid.

Based on medieval documents, the above meeting took place during the winter of 873–874. Hålogaland's rather close vicinity to Kvenland is also demonstrated c. 1157 in the geographical chronicle Leiðarvísir og borgarskipan by the Icelandic Abbot Níkulás Bergsson (Nikolaos), who provides descriptions of lands around Norway:

Closest to Denmark is little Svíþjóð (Sweden), there is Eyland (Öland); then is Gotland (Gotland); then Helsingaland (Hälsingland); then Vermaland (Värmland); then two Kvenlönd (Kvenlands), and they extend to north of Bjarmaland (Bjarmia).

As recorded in Hákonar saga Hákonarsonar, King Hákon Hákonarson settled some of the people of Bjarmaland in the area surrounding the Malangen fjord near modern Tromsø in the 1230s or 1240s. According to Saxo Grammaticus in his Gesta Danorum, King Helgi of Hålogaland married a Princess Thora of Lappland and Bjarmaland, daughter of Prince Gusi, but in other sources he is only given as King of Lappland. In any event, for centuries the Norwegians of Hålogaland had extensive relations with both the Bjarmar and Saami, and to some extent also the Kvens.

=== Modern usage ===
In modern times, the term Hålogaland is used in a variety of senses. For some purposes, all of Northern Norway, Svalbard and Jan Mayen are covered under the term Hålogaland. For other purposes the counties of Nordland and Troms constitute Hålogaland. Hålogaland or even Mid Hålogaland are frequent terms covering the smaller districts of Ofoten, Lofoten and Vesterålen, as well as the municipalities of Gratangen, Harstad, Ibestad, Kvæfjord, and Tjeldsund of Troms county. The term has also been used in this last sense, minus the Lofoten archipelago.

The name is currently used by the Dioceses of Nord-Hålogaland, Sør-Hålogaland, as well as by a Court of Appeal, a theater and a large bridge. A derived name is Helgeland which refers to southern Nordland.

== History ==
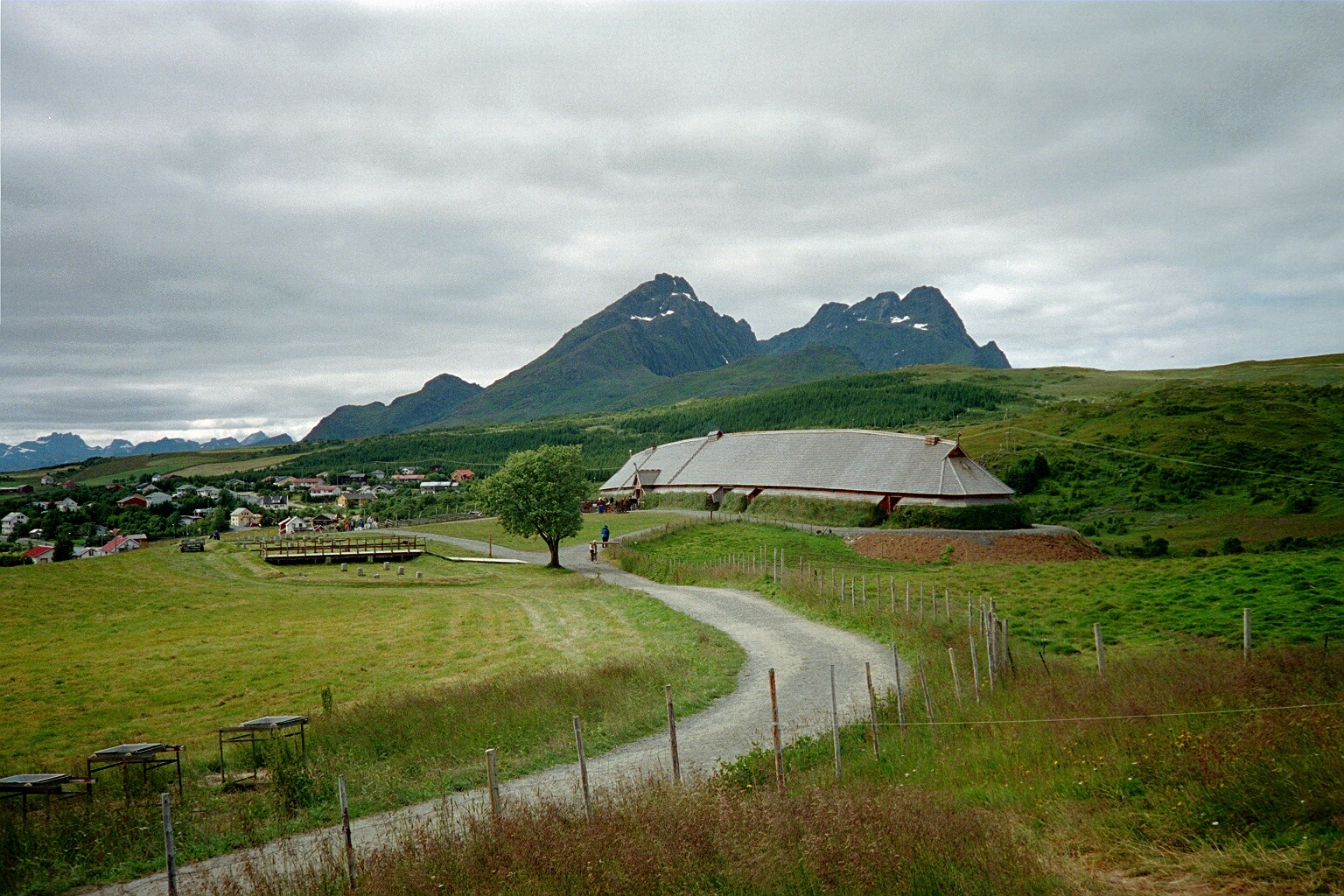
Chieftain House at Borg in Lofoten Lofotr Viking Museum

Hålogaland figures extensively in the Norse sagas, and in Heimskringla, especially the Ynglinga Saga and Háleygjatal. It was inhabited by the race of Hölgi (Háleygja ætt) who was the eponymous hero of Hålogaland.

In the saga Heimskringla, a man called Gudlög led a number of Norwegian pirates that were fought by the Swedish king Jorund and king Godgest of Hålogaland was given a horse by the Swedish king Adils. The first earl of Lade, Håkon Grjotgardsson, ruler of Trøndelag, came from Hålogaland, and sought to extend his kingdom southwards. Here, he met with Harald Fairhair, and joined him.

Archaeologists have uncovered the Chieftain House at Borg in Lofoten (På Borg på Vestvågøya i Lofoten), a large Viking Age building believed to have been already established around the year 500. Archaeological studies commenced here in 1983 and in 1986–89, a joint Scandinavian research project was conducted at Borg. Excavations brought to light remains of the largest building ever to be found from the Viking Era in Norway, 83 meters long and 9 meters high. The chieftain's seat at Borg is estimated to have been abandoned around AD 950. Today the site is the location of the Lofotr Viking Museum.

== Geography ==
Hålogaland is a drowned coastline containing extensive mountainous fjords and islands. It was a refuge for Viking ships as well as a way station for voyagers to the White Sea, which offered access to Russia. Narvik was an important World War II objective. In 2008, the name was proposed as the possible name of an independent Northern Norway.

== See also ==
- Þorgerðr Hölgabrúðr – Goddess strongly associated with Hölgi
- Gunnhild, Mother of Kings – given as from Hålogaland and a daughter of Ozur Toti in Heimskringla and Egil's saga
- Ottar from Hålogaland – Viking adventurer from Hålogaland
- Thorir Hund – Great chief in Hålogaland
- Earls of Lade – claimed to be his descendants
- Hrafnistumannasögur
  - Ketils saga hœngs – Legendary saga about chieftain Kettil Trout from Hrafnista (Ramsta, Nærøy) in Hålogaland
  - Gríms saga loðinkinna – its sequel
  - Örvar-Odd's saga – their sequel
- Egill Skallagrímsson – hero of Egil's saga and Icelandic descendant of the Hrafnista family
- Hrafn Haengsson – Icelandic lawspeaker, also a descendant and thus cousin of Egill's
- Hårek of Tjøtta – contemporary of Thorir Hund and relation of the Norwegian Crown
- Battle of Stiklestad
- Hálfdanar saga Eysteinssonar – descendants of King Sæming of Hålogaland through King Thrand of Trondheim

== Other sources ==
- Woolf, Alex (2007). From Pictland to Alba, 789–1070. The New Edinburgh History of Scotland. Edinburgh: Edinburgh University Press. ISBN 978-0-7486-1234-5.
- Berglund, Birgitta (1994) Helgeland historie (Mosjøen) ISBN 82-90148-55-0
- Bertelsen, Reidar (1985) Lofoten og Vesteralens historie: Fra den eldste tida til ca. 1500 e (Kommunene i Lofoten og Vesteralen) ISBN 978-82-90412-37-6
