= Litr =

Norse mythical character

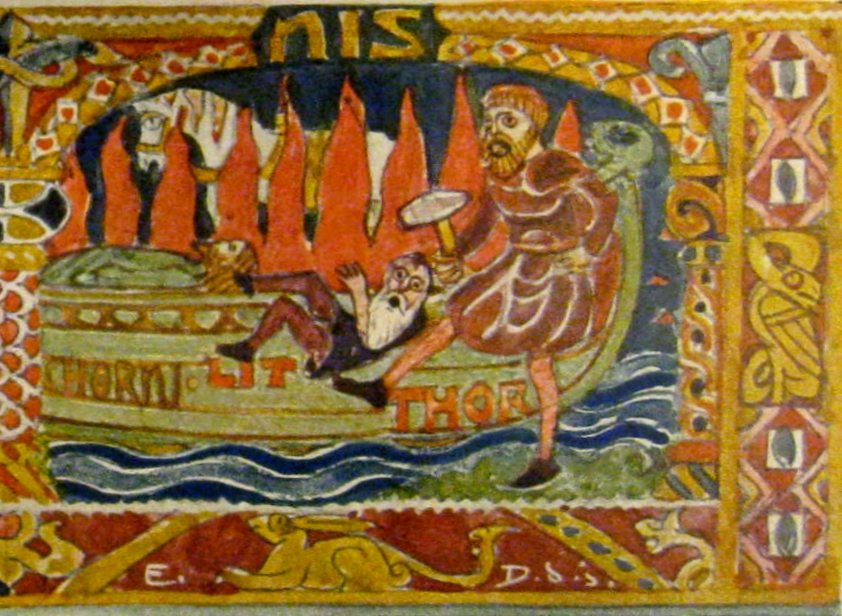
Thor kicks Litr onto Baldr's burning ship, illustration by Emil Doepler (ca. 1905)

Litr (also Lit; Old Norse: [ˈlitz̠], 'colour, appearance') is the name borne by a dwarf and a jötunn in Norse mythology.

== Name ==
The Old Norse name Litr has been translated as 'colour', 'hue', or 'appearance'. It stems from a Proto-Germanic form reconstructed as *ulituz (compare with Gothic wlits 'shape, appearance', or Old English wlite 'clearness, sparkle').

== Dwarf ==
In Snorri Sturluson's Gylfaginning (49), Litr is kicked into Baldr's funeral pyre by Thor:

Then Thor stood by and hallowed the pyre with Mjöllnir; and before his feet ran a certain dwarf which was named Litr; Thor kicked at him with his foot and thrust him into the fire, and he burned.

—Gylfaginning, Brodeur's translation

Litr is also listed as a dwarf in Völuspá (12).

A dwarf named Litr also appears in Áns saga bogsveigis, where he is coerced by the protagonist Án to build him a bow.

A dwarf named Litr appears in Þorsteins saga Víkingssonar. In this, he is the foster-father of Halfdan, sworn brother of Viking. After Dís, daughter of King Kol Kroppinbak of India, uses a magic drinking horn to afflict Viking with leprosy, Halfdan asks Litr to steal the horn from Dís. Litr does not want to, fearing Dís, but he agrees and returns with the horn seven days later, which heals Viking. Dís's husband Jokul says later that Litr used tricks to betray Dís and steal the horn, and also that Litr grievously wounded her.

== Jötunn ==
In a stanza by Bragi Boddason quoted in Snorri's Skáldskaparmál (42) Litr is also mentioned in a kenning for Thor: "Lit's men's fight-challenger" ("Litar flotna fangboði"). Given that Thor is the enemy of jötnar, it is generally assumed that, in this kenning, Litr must refer to a giant. Litr is also a jötunn in one version of the poem about Thor by Þorbjörn dísarskáld, where the skald lists jötnar and gýgjar killed by the god (but Litr only appears in one manuscript, the others mentioning Lútr instead).

This led John Lindow to suggest that there may have been originally only one Litr, a jötunn, for "it would not have been inappropriate for Thor to have killed a giant in some earlier version of the funeral of Baldr".
