= Thorkel =

Thorkel or Thorkell (Þórkæll / Þorkell) is an Old Norse masculine personal name. Among the more famous holders of the name are:

- Thorkel of Namdalen, ninth-century jarl and father of Ketil Trout.
- Thorkell Súrsson, tenth-century Icelander and character in the Gísla saga.
- Thorkell Eyjólfsson, Icelandic goði of the late tenth and early eleventh century, husband of Guðrún Ósvífursdóttir and stepfather of Bolli Bollason.
- Thorkell Arden, eleventh-century progenitor of the Arden family, one of only three Anglo-Saxon noble families to survive the Norman Conquest with their position and properties intact. Distant ancestor of the playwright William Shakespeare.
- Thorkell the Tall, eleventh-century Jomsviking leader and jarl.
- Thorkell Leifsson, Greenlandic goði of the eleventh century and son of explorer Leif Eriksson.
- Thorkel Fóstri ("Foster-father Thorkel"), foster father of Thorfinn Sigurdsson, Jarl of Orkney c. 1020–1064.
- Þorkell Sigurbjörnsson, Icelandic composer.
- Thorkell (Vinland Saga), a fictional character from the manga series Vinland Saga.
- Thorkill (Bishop of Reval), Bishop of Reval (modern-day Tallinn) 1238–1260.
