= Viking (Norse mythology) =

Son of Vífil and Eimyrja in Þorsteins saga Víkingssonar

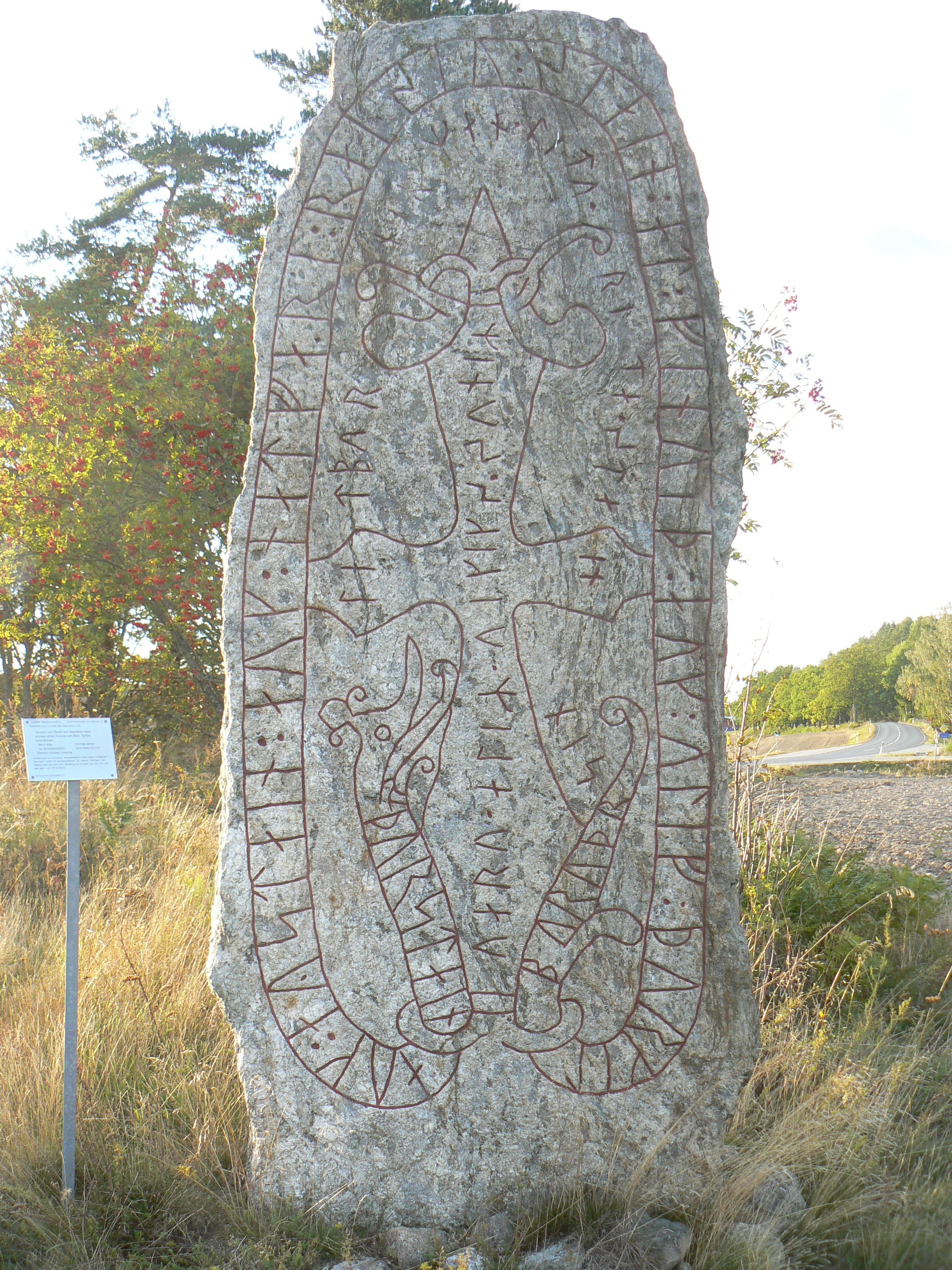
Sö 54

Viking is the name of the son of Vífil and Eimyrja in Þorsteins saga Víkingssonar. Viking is the father of Thorsten and Thorer. Further details of his legend are recounted in Frithiof's Saga.

He has been compared to the man by the same name on runestone Sö 54 in Bjudby, Södermanland, Sweden. It also mentions a prominent family, and besides the father Víkingr it names three sons with the same names. Moreover, there are also close correspondences with the other names.

== Life and adventures ==
The two daughters of Logi (Haloge) are stolen away by suitors to nearby islands. Viking is a son of one of these daughters, Eimyrja. He grows up in Bornholm. By the time he is 15, he is the biggest and strongest man of his time. His magic sword Angervadil is fatal even to giants. The sword was inscribed with Runic letters, which blazed in time of war, but gleamed with a dim light in time of peace. The sword was taken by Vifil from Björn Bluetooth. His magic dragon ship is Ellida, the first ship in the North, given to him as a gift by Aegir. The ship is big like a fortress, but faster than an eagle. It is not fastened by nails, but rather, the planks were grown together.

Hunvor, a Swedish princess, asks for his help against the giant suitor Harek the Ironhead, son of king Kol Humpback and younger brother of Björn Bluetooth, who harasses her. Viking slays the giant in a holmgang (duel) using the magic sword. Viking is unable to marry her because is it disgraceful to marry before 20 and goes in viking. The giant's relatives, who are adept at magic, pursue him and bring him sea perils. On his journey, he meets and befriends Halfdan, son of Ulf. Halfdan is offered foster-brotherhood in return for helping him lift the curse of Harek's older witch-sister Dis. Viking becomes ill, but Halfdan converses with his fosterfather Lit, a dwarf. Lit instructs Halfdan to take the magic horn Dis inherited from her father Kol. Meanwhile, Ingjald Strout, another son of king Kol, invades Sweden with a warparty, kills the king, Hunvor's father Ring and kidnaps Hunvor and her maid Ingeborg, the daughter of the jarl of Ulleråker. Jokul Ironback, the berserker husband of Dis goes after Viking and Hunvor. Lit steals Dis horn and uses it to cure Viking. Viking and Halfdan goes to battle with the ships of Jokul Ironback and Dis. The fosterbrothers loses many men, but attempt to board Jokul's ship. Viking cuts Jokul in half. Dis has been paralyzed in bed by Lit and is found as such by Viking and Halfdan. The fosterbrother's then stoned her to death in her bed. When their wounded comrades are healed, the duo sets out for India with 20 ships (carrying 600 warriors).

Ingjald Strout fortifies his burg but it's stormed by the brave fosterbrothers. Ingjald is put in chains and Hunvor and Ingeborg are rescued. However, Ingjald escapes and kills his watchers. The fosterbrother's discovers that Ingjald has used is trollcraft to flee. The fosterbrother's sail home and Halfdan courts Ingeborg. In Sweden, Viking marries Hunvor and Halfdan Ingeborg. Viking and Hunvor has a son, which they name Ring after Hunvor's father. Sadly, Hunvor falls ill and dies.

Viking sires nine sons by a second wife, Finna. He befriends his worthy foe Njorfe, King of Upplands, in Norway, who also has nine sons. Viking is made jarl by the king and Halfdan becomes the king's hersir. The two groups of sons are highly competitive against each other. In a brutal ball game, they beat and maim each other, breaking each other's arms. A son of Viking, near death, slays a son of Njorfe. Viking scolds this son and sends him to an island in Lake Werner. Two more sons go with him, including the eldest Thorsten (or Thorstein). Viking gives Angervadil to Thorsten and tells him to wait quietly on the island until the danger is over. Njorfe's sons want revenge. They use magic to conjure a frost that freezes the lake and travel across it to attack the three sons of Viking. Two of Viking's sons survive: Thorsten and Thorer. Two of Njorfe's sons survive, including his eldest son, Jokul, a sorcerer. Njorfe's sons use magic to discover that Thorsten and Thorer are alive. Viking sends his two sons to the court of Halfdan for safety.

Viking's son Thorsten and grandson Frithiof inherit Angurvadel and Ellida.

== See also ==
- Fornjot
- Frithiof's Saga
