= Litre (disambiguation) =

- Litre (or liter) is an SI-accepted metric system unit of volume.
- Lithraea caustica (or litre) is a Chilean plant that can cause contact dermatitis in humans.
- Litr is the name of a dwarf or a giant in Norse mythology.
