= Brandtzæg =

Brandtzæg is a Norwegian surname that may refer to

- Birger Brandtzæg (1893–1971), Norwegian merchant
- Per Brandtzæg (1936–2016), Norwegian physician
- Svein Richard Brandtzæg (born 1957), Norwegian chemist and business executive
- Torgeir Brandtzæg (born 1941), Norwegian ski jumper
