= Vangsnes Church =

Church in Vestland, Norway

- Vangsnes kyrkjex
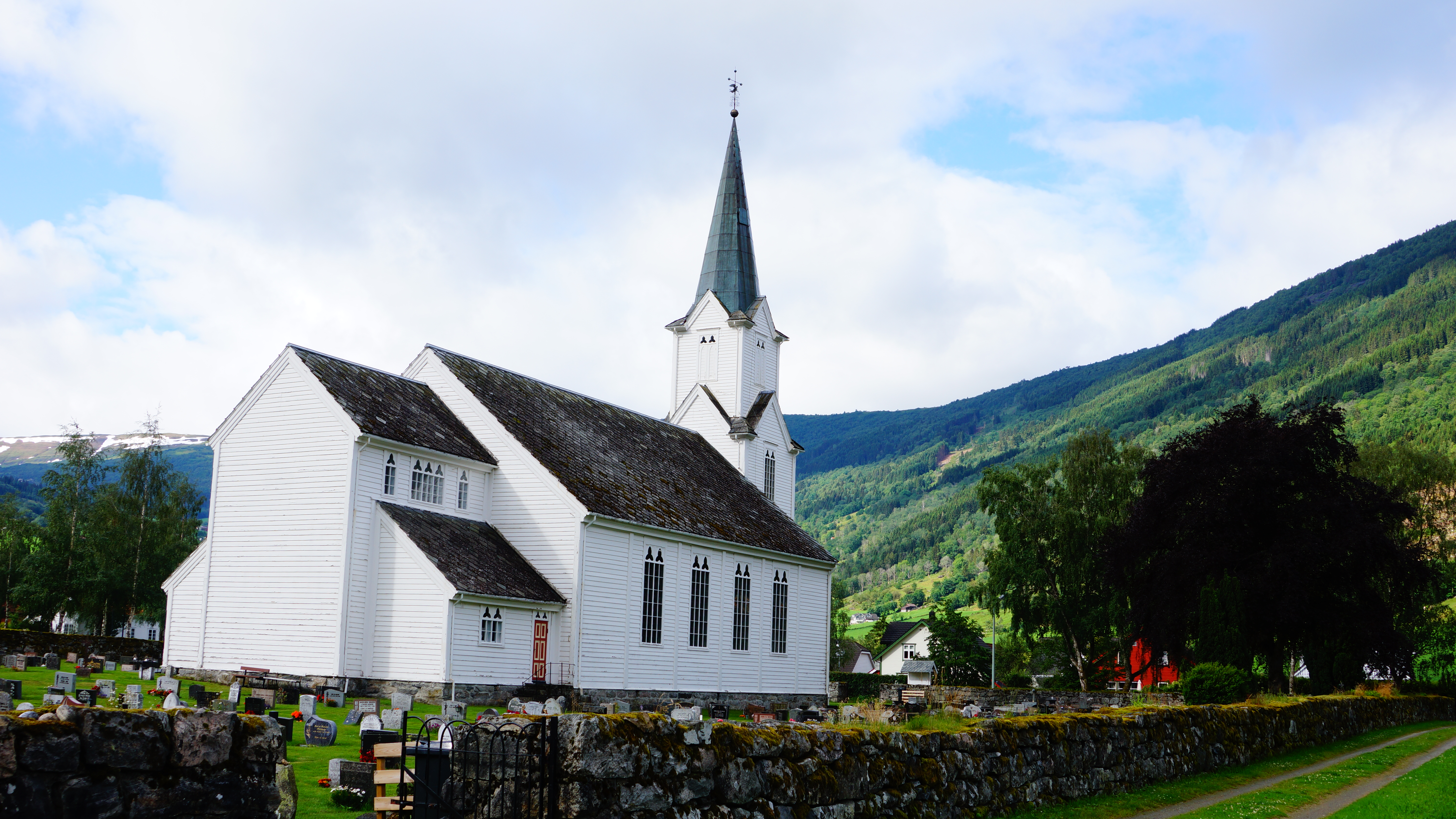
- View of the church
- Vangsnes Church
- 61°10′11″N 6°38′30″E
- Location: Vik Municipality, Vestland
- Country: Norway
- Denomination: Church of Norway
- Previous denomination: Catholic Church
- Churchmanship: Evangelical Lutheran

History
- Status: Parish church
- Founded: 12th century
- Consecrated: 24 October 1861

Architecture
- Functional status: Active
- Architect: Harald Ulrich Sverdrup
- Architectural type: Long church
- Completed: 1861 (165 years ago)

Specifications
- Capacity: 261
- Materials: Wood

Administration
- Diocese: Bjørgvin bispedømme
- Deanery: Sogn prosti
- Parish: Vangsnes
- Norwegian Cultural Heritage Site
- Type: Church
- Status: Listed
- ID: 85762

Vangsnes Church (Norwegian: Vangsnes kyrkje) is a parish church of the Church of Norway in Vik Municipality in Vestland county, Norway. It is located in the village of Vangsnes. It is the church for the Vangsnes parish which is part of the Sogn prosti (deanery) in the Diocese of Bjørgvin. The white, wooden church was built in a long church design in 1861 using plans drawn up by the local Vicar Harald Ulrik Sverdrup. The church seats about 261 people.

The large Statue of Fridtjof is located about 300 metres (980 ft) north of the church.

== History ==
The earliest existing historical records of the church date back to the year 1340, but the church was not new that year. The first church at Vangsnes was a wooden stave church that was likely built in the mid-1100s. In 1854, the church was described as having a 7-by-5.35-metre (23.0 ft × 17.6 ft) nave with a 3.75-by-3.75-metre (12.3 ft × 12.3 ft) choir. By the mid-1800s, the 700-year-old building was in poor condition. It was said to be so bad that snow and wind would get through the walls. In 1861, the stave church was torn down and replaced with a new church on the same site.

The new building was designed by parish priest Harald Ulrik Sverdrup and the lead builder was A.A. Åse. The new church was consecrated on 24 October 1861 by the Dean Thomas Erichsen. In 1836, a sacristy was built just north of the choir. The church was restored in 1957-1958 and during this work, a second floor seating gallery was built.

== See also ==
- List of churches in Bjørgvin
