= Thorkel of Namdalen =

Thorkel of Namdalen was a Norwegian jarl in Namdalen who lived in the mid to late ninth century CE. Thorkel married Hrafnhilda, the daughter of Ketil Trout of Hrafnista. Their son, named Ketil Trout after his grandfather, was to become one of the major players in the early settlement of Iceland. Through Ketil Thorkel was the grandfather of Hrafn Haengsson, the first lawspeaker of Iceland.
