= Ketils saga hœngs =

Icelandic legendary saga

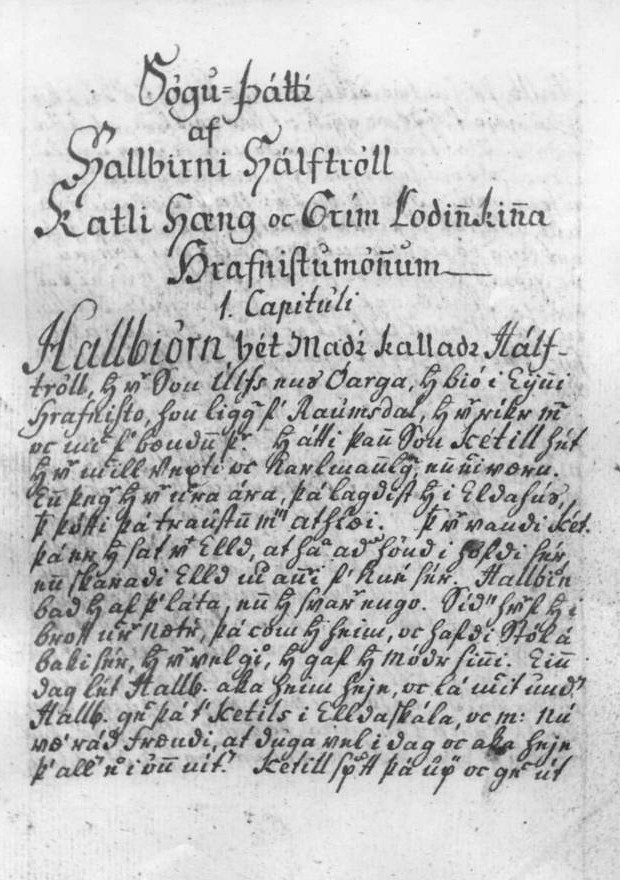
A manuscript page from Ketils saga hœngs.

The hero of this saga is often confused with his grandson by the same name.

Ketils saga hœngs or The Saga of Ketil Trout is an Icelandic legendary saga on the Norwegian chieftain Ketil Hallbjarnarson Haeng (Old Norse: Ketill hœngr Hallbjarnarson), also known as "Ketil Trout of Hrafnista". Hrafnista is present-day Ramsta, Hålogaland, Northern Norway.

The work belongs in a group of sagas collectively called the Hrafnistumannasögur surrounding Ketil Trout and his relatives.

Ketil grows up to become a rascal and an Askeladd, but matures and becomes a formidable champion. He slays a dragon and goes through a number of fights, mostly to defend his daughter. In a fight with Gusir, the king of the Samis, he slays the king and takes his sword and three magic arrowheads of flintstone (Hremsa, Fifa and Flaug).

Together with the giantess Hrafnhild, Ketil has the son Grim Shaggy-Cheek, who was the father of Orvar-Odd.

Ketil is traditionally regarded as the father of Hrafnhilda, who married Thorkel of Namdalen and bore him a son, the Icelandic chieftain Ketil Thorkelsson. This grandson also went by the name "Ketil Trout".

== Sources ==
Citations

== Bibliography ==
- Ohlmarks, Åke (1993). Fornnordiskt Lexikon. Stockholm: Tiden. ISBN 9155040446.
- Waggoner, Ben (2012). The Hrafnista Sagas. New Haven, CT: Troth Publications. ISBN 978-0557729418.
