= Vangsnes =

Village in Vik Municipality, Norway

- Village
- Interactive map of Vangsnes
- Location within Vestland Location within Norway
- Coordinates: 61.17445°N 6.63523°E
- Country: Norway
- Region: Western Norway
- County: Vestland
- District: Sogn
- Municipality: Vik Municipality
- Elevation: 3 m (9.8 ft)
- Time zone: UTC+01:00 (CET)
  - Summer (DST): UTC+02:00 (CEST)
- Post Code: 6894 Vangsnes

Vangsnes is a village located in Vik Municipality in Vestland county, Norway. It's located on a relatively flat and fertile peninsula that juts out on the south side of the Sognefjorden, roughly at the midpoint of the fjord which is Norway's longest. The village of Balestrand lies about 7 kilometres (4.3 mi) to the northwest (across the fjord) and the villages of Leikanger-Hermansverk lie about 11 kilometres (6.8 mi) straight east (also across the fjord). Vangsnes Church is located in the village.

The village sits along Norwegian National Road 13 and it is connected with the villages of Hella and Dragsviki in Sogndal Municipality, both on the north side of Sognefjorden, through a ferry system operated by Fjord1.

== Statue ==
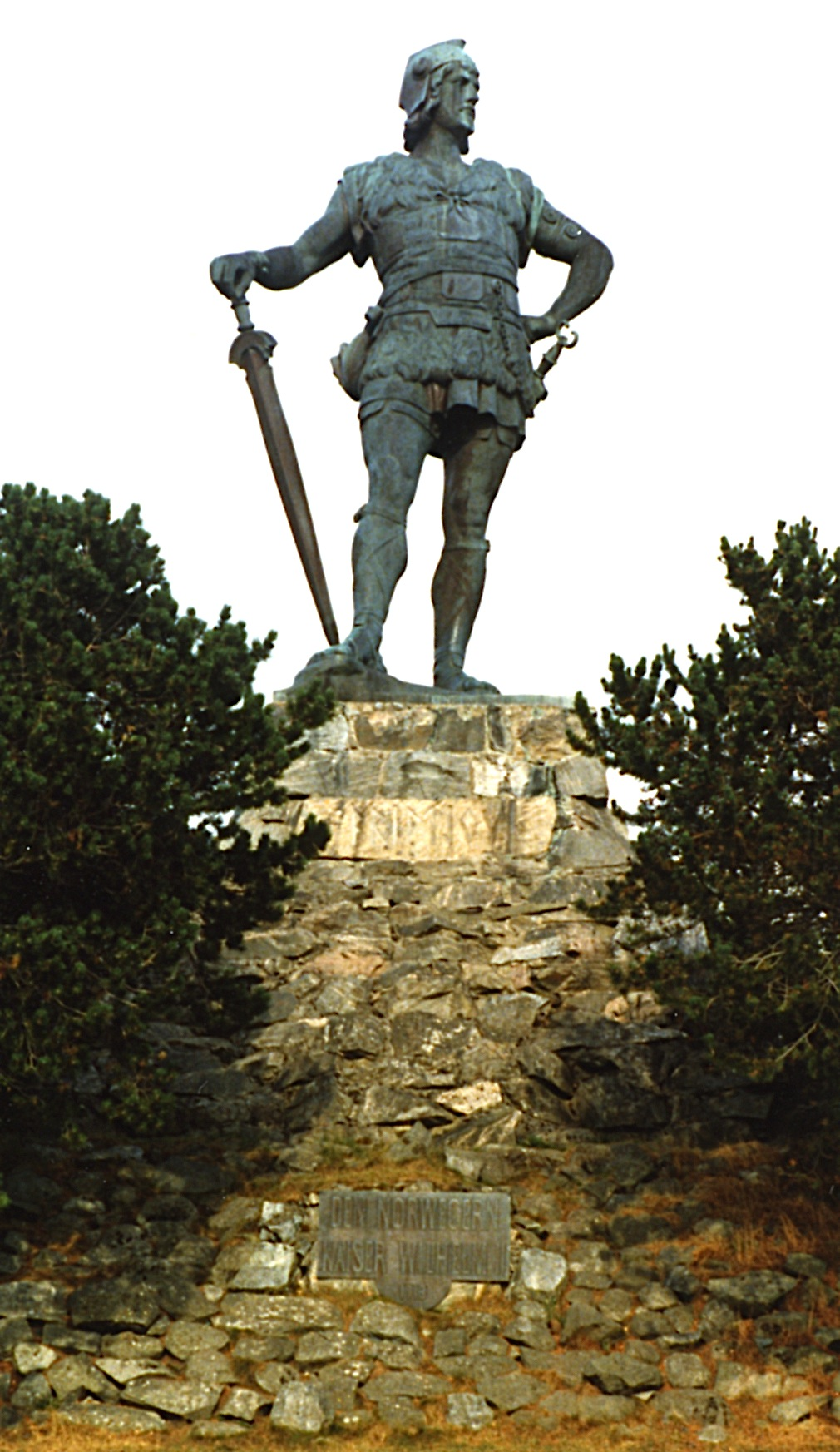
Statue of Fridtjof Max Unger (1913)

Vangsnes is best known as the site of the statue of Fridtjof, who was the king of Ringerike and Sogn according to Friðþjófs saga hins frœkna (Fridtjof's Saga). The statue was commissioned by Kaiser Wilhelm II of Germany. It is 10.5 metres (34 ft) high and is situated on a 12-metre (39 ft) high platform. The statue was sculpted by German sculptor Max Unger (1854-1918). It was transported to Vangsnes in 15 sections and erected during February 1913.
