= Örvar-Oddr =

Norse legendary hero

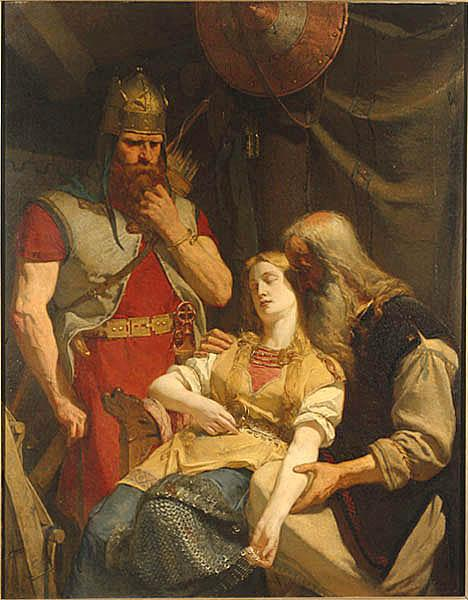
Ǫrvar-Oddr informs Ingeborg about Hjalmar's death, by August Malmström (1859)

Ǫrvar-Oddr, also spelt Örvar-Oddr (Old Norse: Ǫrvar-Oddr [ˈɔrwɑr-ˌod̪ːr], "Arrow-Odd" or "Arrow's Point") is a legendary hero about whom an anonymous Icelander wrote a fornaldarsaga in the latter part of the 13th century. Ǫrvar-Odds saga, the Saga of Ǫrvar-Odd, became very popular and contains old legends and songs. He also appears in Hervarar saga and, concerning the battle on Samsø, in Gesta Danorum.

== Plot summary ==
=== Prophecy ===
Oddr was the son of Grímr Loðinkinni and the grandson of Ketill Hœngr (both of whom have their own sagas) of Hålogaland. When he was an infant, a vǫlva predicted that he would be killed by his own horse, Faxi, at the place where he was born, at the age of three hundred (which may signify 360, as the unit in question is probably the "long hundred" commonly used in medieval Germanic languages, denoting 120 rather than 100).

In order to thwart the prediction, he killed his horse, buried it deep in the ground and left his home intending never to return again. As he was leaving, his father gave him some magic arrows (Gusisnautar) which soon earned him the cognomen arrow. After a voyage to Finnmark, Bjarmaland, Holmgård, Constantinople and Jotunheim, he fought successfully against several Vikings.

=== Hjalmar and Angantyr ===
However, when he encountered the Swedish champion Hjalmar, he met his match. The fight was even and the two warriors not only became friends, but entered sworn brotherhood.

The two heroes fought many battles together (for more see Hjalmar), until after the famous battle of Samsø against the sons of Arngrim, Ǫrvar-Oddr had to bring the dead Hjalmar (killed by Angantyr) to Uppsala and his betrothed Ingeborg, the daughter of the Swedish king.

Ǫrvar-Oddr travelled in the South fighting against the corsairs of the Mediterranean, he was baptised in Sicily, was shipwrecked and arrived alone in the Holy Land.

=== Ǫgmundr Flóki ===
Oddr sought vengeance against Ǫgmundr Flóki ("Ogmund Tussock" or Ǫgmundr 'tuft'; aka Ǫgmundr Eyþjófsbani or "Eythjof's-killer") for the murder of his blood-brother Þórðr stafnglamr (Thord Prow-Gleam). He and his crew headed toward a fjord in Helluland ("Slabland"), where Ǫgmundr was to be found, according to Oddr's half-giant son, Vignir. During their voyage, they encounter two huge sea-creatures that resembled islands:

…said Vignir. "I'll tell you about it; these were two sea-monsters, one called Sea-Reek, and the other Heather-Back. The Sea-Reek is the biggest monster in the whole ocean. It swallows men and ships, and whales too, and anything else around. It stays underwater for days, then it puts up its mouth and nostrils, and when it does, it never stays on the surface for less than one tide.

There had been five men sent to disembark on what they thought was an island, but the Heather-Back (lyngbakr) plunged into sea, and those men perished. However, the group had safely sailed through the jaws of the Sea-Reek (hafgufa), the other monster that Ǫgmundr had sent by magic to intercept the party.

=== Barkman ===
Oddr becomes Barkman (næfrmaðr, 'birch bark man'), a sort of wildman dressed in bark. He arrived in Hunaland and meets King Herrauðr, where his true identity was soon revealed due to his heroic actions. After defeating the king of Bjalkaland ("pelt country"), who used to pay tribute to the king of Hunaland, he married the Herrauðr' daughter Silkisif and became the next king.

=== Death ===
After all this, Oddr became homesick and went back home. Walking over the grave of Faxi, he mocked the old prophecy, but tripped over the skull of a horse from which a snake appeared. The snake bit him and he died.

== Analysis ==
The saga includes several stories, such as the voyage of Ottar from Hålogaland to Bjarmaland, the legend of Hjalmar's foster-brother Sóti, Starkaðr, Ketill Hœingr, Odysseus and Polyphemus, Sigurd Jorsalfare and the Rus' ruler Oleg of Novgorod (the attack on Bjalkaland).

The motif of Ǫrvar-Oddr's mocking the prophecy and death has parallels in the Primary Chronicle, which describes the manner of the death of Oleg (also of Varangian origin) in similar terms. Oleg's legendary death from "the skull of a horse" became the subject of one of the best known ballads in the Russian language, published by Alexander Pushkin in 1826. Another variant on the same theme is found in the legend of Sir Robert de Shurland on the Isle of Sheppey in Kent, England, recorded in the 17th century, and which in 1837 inspired one of the popular Ingoldsby Legends of Richard Barham.

Ǫgmundr Flóki owned a cloak made from the beards of kings he collected, as did the giant of Mont Saint-Michel, enemy of King Arthur in Brittany. (Note: The giant which was called Retho by Geoffrey of Monmouth, and Royns (Ryence, Ryens, Ryons) by Thomas Malory.)

== Ǫrvar-Oddr and Norwegian Rugii ==
Ǫrvar-Oddr spent his childhood and youth in Berurjóðr near Eikund (Eigersund). In the saga, Ǫrvar-Oddr responds to the question of the priestess about who raised him in such folly that he refuses to worship the highest god and leader of the Æsir, Odin:

"I was raised by Ingjaldr in my childhood, who ruled Eikund and inhabited Jadar."

At the beginning of the 19th century, historians, literary scholars, and geographers believed that Oddr's fate was connected to the Norwegian Rogaland. In the General Encyclopedia of Sciences and Arts, it is pointed out that in the Ǫrvar-Odds saga, it concerns the island of Eigerøy.

The settlement of Berurjóðr (Berglud), the island of Eikund (Eigerøy), and the historical region of Jadar (Jæren) are located in the Norwegian province of Rogaland, which was inhabited by Rugii in the Middle Ages. Egersund is the bay between the island of Eigerøy and the mainland, which was called "Eikundarsund" in the Middle Ages. The island of Eigerøy was called "Eikund" in the Middle Ages. The name of this island indicates rich deposits of high-quality oak wood used for shipbuilding, as the word "eik" is the Norwegian word for "oak." Eikund and Eikundarsund were some of the oldest geographical names in Norway and are already found in the Óláfs saga helga, written in the 13th century by the Icelandic author Snorri Sturluson.

== See also ==
- Hrafnistumannasögur
