= Mjoll =

Goddess from Norse myth

Mjǫll is a goddess from Norse mythology. She was said to be a descendant of Fornjót and to have three siblings: Dríffa, Fǫnn, and Thorri.

== Name ==
The name Mjǫll means "fresh, powdery snow" or "fine driving snow" in Old Norse. It is assumed because of this association of her name with snow that she is a goddess of snow.
