= Max Unger (sculptor) =

German sculptor (1854–1918)

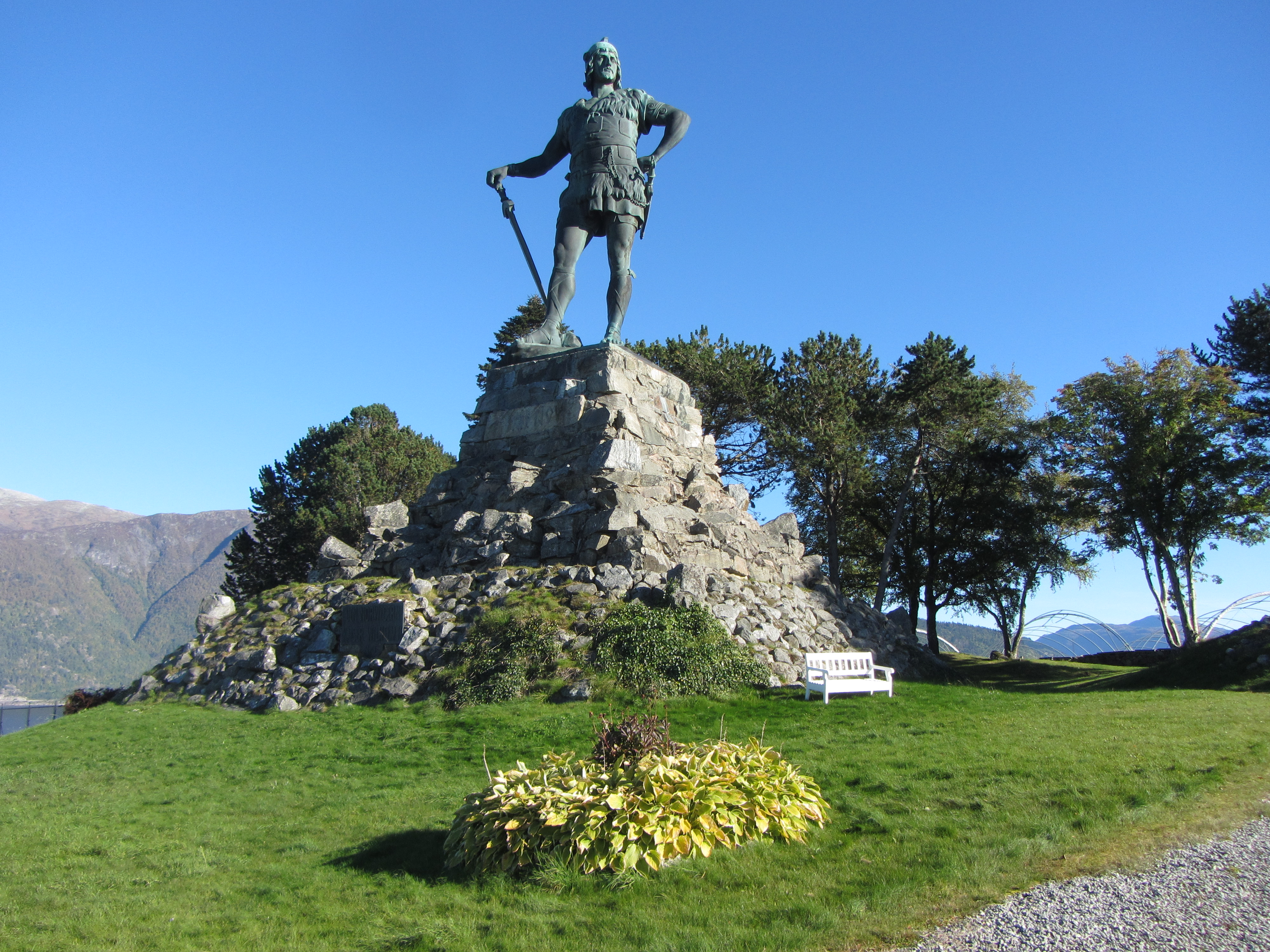
Fridtjof the Bold; Vik, Norway

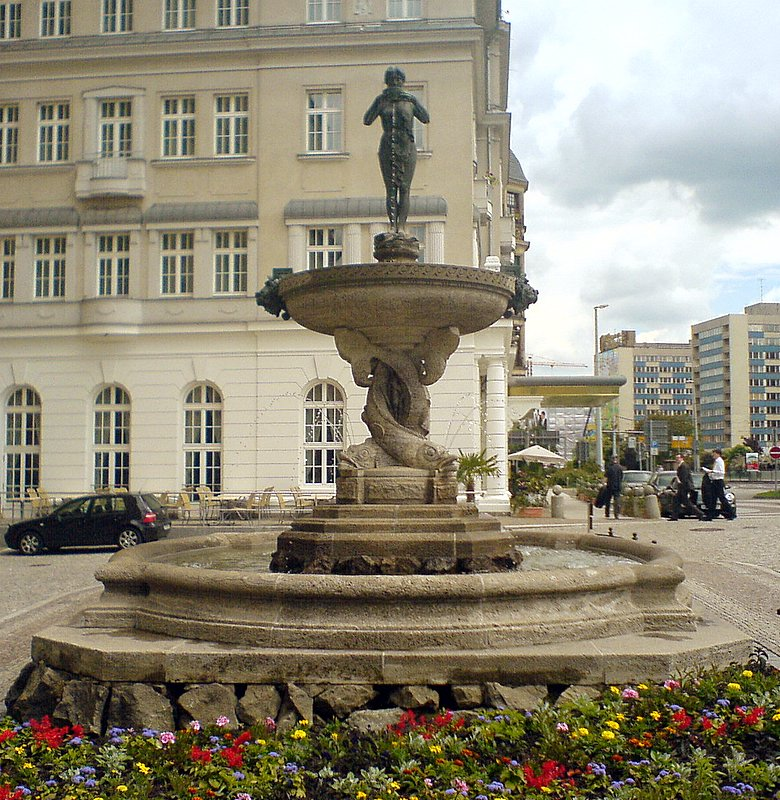
Villersbrunnen, Leipzig

Max Unger (26 January 1854, in Berlin – 31 May 1918, in Bad Kissingen) was a German sculptor.

== Life ==
He studied sculpture at the Prussian Academy of Art under Fritz Schaper and worked in the studios of Albert Wolff from 1874 to 1875. After two more years of study in Italy, he established his own studios in Berlin-Kreuzberg.

== Selected major works ==
- 1888: Statue of Generalfeldmarschall Prince Friedrich Karl Nikolaus von Preußen, in Frankfurt (Oder).
- 1898: Siegesallee (Victory Avenue) project, Group 2: with Otto I, Margrave of Brandenburg as the central figure; flanked by Sibold (died c.1190), first Abbott of Lehnin Abbey, and Pribislav-Henry, last ruler of the Hevelli tribe. The statues were vandalized shortly after being dedicated and were severely damaged in World War II. They are now on display at the Spandau Citadel.
- 1900: Kaiser Wilhelm I, Equestrian statue on the Wilhelmsplatz in Frankfurt (Oder).
- 1900 Kaiser Wilhelm I statue in Ulm; originally in the Marktplatz, since 1939 in the Olgaplatz.
- 1903: Leipzig, Villersbrunnen; Named after Helene de Villers, the late wife of a certain Herr Dürr (of the publishing firm Dürr and Geibels) who commissioned the work. It was melted down in 1942 and reconstructed in 2003.
- 1913, statue of Fridtjof the Brave in Vangsnes (Vik) on the Sognefjord, Norway. It was commissioned by Kaiser Wilhelm II, transported to Norway in fifteen pieces and assembled by 100 Imperial German Navy sailors. There was talk of dismantling the statue, during both world wars, but it was allowed to remain. Today, it is by far his best known work and has become a local landmark.
