= Hrafnistumannasögur =

Norse legendary sagas

The Hrafnistumannasögur is a group of legendary sagas surrounding the family of Ketil Trout of Halogaland. (Ketil is sometimes confused with his grandson, Ketil Trout of Namdalen.) The group is named after Hrafnista, modern Ramsta in northern Norway.

- Ketils saga hœngs
- Gríms saga loðinkinna
- Örvar-Odds saga
- Áns saga bogsveigis

Ketil Trout, the protagonist of Ketils saga hœngs, was the father of Grimr Hairy-Cheek, the protagonist of Gríms saga loðinkinna, and the grandfather of Orvar-Odd, the protagonist of Örvar-Odds saga.

In the opening lines of Egil's saga, which features extensive relations with the Ramsta family and Halogaland and thus may be called the nearest saga to the Hrafnista group, we are informed about Ketil Trout's father Hallbjörn Half-troll, who was half Saami.

== Translations ==
- Waggoner, Ben (2012). The Hrafnista Sagas. New Haven, CT: Troth Publications. ISBN 978-0557729418.
