= Glöð =

Figure in Norse mythology

Glöð ("glad" or "glowing embers"; sometimes anglicized as Glod or Glut) is a legendary queen who figures in the Norse Þorsteins saga Víkingssonar.

She is a daughter of Grímr of Grímsgarðr in Jötunheimr and his wife Alvör, the sister of King Álf the Old of Álfheimr. She is also the wife of Logi, also referred to as Hálogi, with whom she had two daughters, Eysa or Eisa ("glowing embers") and Eimyrja ("embers").

In Norse mythology, Logi is a fire giant, god and personification of fire, mentioned in the Prose Edda. By extension, Glöð, as Logi's consort, is sometimes identified as a goddess, as are her daughters. In addition to this, the placement of her father, Grímr, in Jötunheimr, identifies him as a jötunn, that is, a supernatural being. So does the placement of her mother, Alvör, in Alfheimr, the realm of the Light Elves. This suggests that Glöð is perhaps more properly regarded as a mythological figure rather than as a historical one. Glöð is also often wrongly identified as the wife of the god Loki rather than Logi.

== See also ==
- Fornjót, Glöð's father-in-law
