= Birger Brandtzæg =

Norwegian businessman (1893 – July 1971)

- Born: 29 April 1893; Abelvær, Norway
- Died: 16 July 1971 (aged 78)
- Occupations: merchant and owner of a fishing station
- Awards: Order of St. Olav

Birger Brandtzæg (29 April 1893 – 16 July 1971) was a Norwegian merchant and owner of a fishing station. He was born in Abelvær. He established the company Brandtzæg Canning in Abelsvær. He was decorated Knight, First Class of the Order of St. Olav in 1952.
