= Ketil Trout (Iceland) =

Ketil Thorkelsson (Old Norse: Ketill Þorkelsson [ˈketelː ˈθorˌkelsˌson]), better known by his nickname Ketil Trout or Ketil Salmon (O.N.: Ketill hængr [ˈketelː ˈhɛːŋɡz̠]; Modern Icelandic: Ketill hængur Þorkelsson [ˈcʰɛːtɪtl̥ ˈhaiŋkʏr ˈθɔrˌcʰɛlsˌsɔːn]), was a Norwegian military commander (hersir) of the late ninth century who settled in Iceland around 900 CE. He appears in Egils saga, the Landnámabók, and other Icelandic sources.

== Biography ==
Ketil was the son of Hrafnhild (daughter of Ketil Trout of Hrafnista) and Thorkel, jarl of Namdalen. Ketil was a man of great wealth and a close friend and kinsman of Thorolf Kveldulfsson and his brother Skallagrim. (Note: Ketil Trout of Hrafnista and Kveldulf were first cousins (the former's father Hallbjorn Half-Troll and the latter's mother Hallbera being siblings, Hence Hrafnhild Ketilsdottir was to Thorolf Kveldulfsson second cousin, and Ketil Trout to him was second cousin once removed.) With his wife Ingunn, Ketil had several children, including Storolf, Herjolf, Helgi, Vestar, and Hrafn Hængsson, the last of whom was one of the first lawspeakers.

A place pivotal in the life of Ketil was an estate named Torgar. (Note: Torgar has been identified as Torget in present-day Brønnøy Municipality, Nordland, Norway) The estate had passed from Ketil's uncle by marriage, Brynjolf, (Note: Brynjolf was husband of Helga Ketilsdottir of Hrafnista.) to his son Bard "the White" Brynjolfsson (Ketil's first cousin). Bard, in turn, bequeathed the estate to Thorolf Kveldulfsson and gave no share to his half-brothers, Harek and Hrærek (sons of Hildirid), whom he considered bastards. The sycophantic brothers, who were favorites of King Harald of Norway (Harald Fairhair; Harald hårfagre), had prevailed on Harald and persuaded him to confiscate Torgar from Thorolf and give it to them. Despite this, the brothers had continued to malign Thorolf's character and induced Harald to attack Thorolf. When Ketil heard of the campaign against Thorolf, he was among a group of Thorolf's allies who set out to support him. However, the expedition arrived too late, and Thorolf had been killed. In retaliation for Thorolf's death, Ketil gathered 60 warriors to raid Torgar and attack Harek and Hrærek. The brothers were killed and their property looted.

Following the events at Torgar, Ketil decided to emigrate to Iceland. His family and allies set sail on two large longships. For their first winter in Iceland, they settled on the eastern bank of the river Ytri-Rangá, but later moved eastwards and took land between "Þjórsá and Markarfljót from fell to firth, and made his home at Hof (Hofi)".

== See also ==
- Ketils saga hœngs
