= Áns saga bogsveigis =

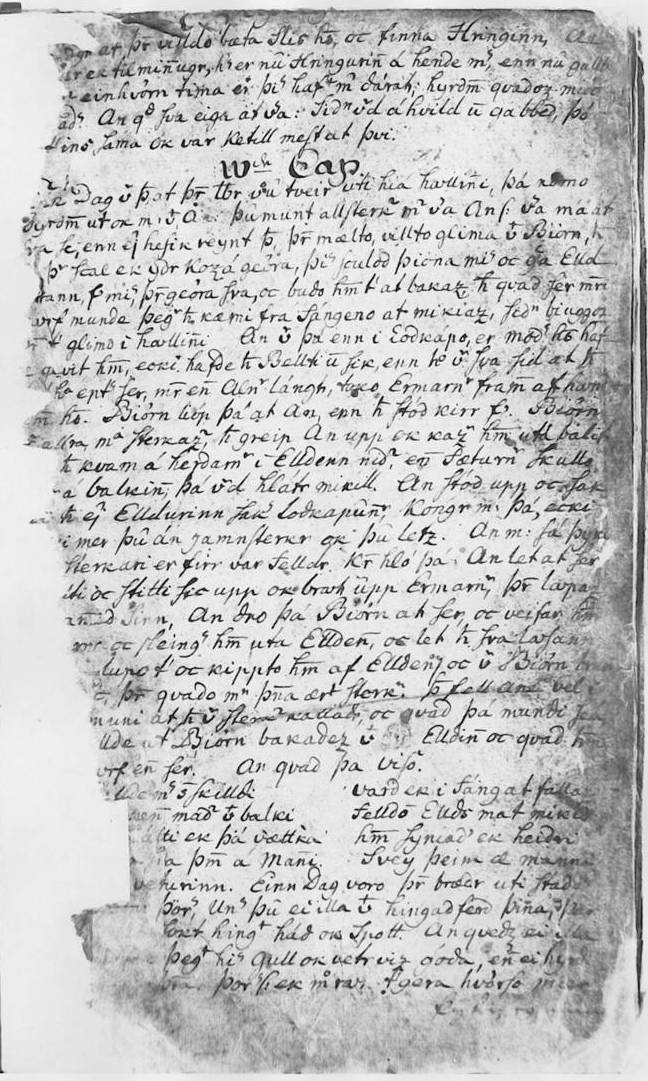
Áns saga bogsveigis ÍB 43 folio.

Áns saga bogsveigis, the saga of Án the bow-bender, is one of the legendary sagas called the Hrafnistumannasögur surrounding the relatives of Ketil Trout. It concerns a feud between An the Bow-bender and Ingjald, king of Namdalen.

It was probably written in the 14th century.
