= Logi (mythology) =

Norse mythical character

Logi (Old Norse: [ˈloɣe], 'fire, flame') or Hálogi ([ˈhɑːˌloɣe], 'High Flame') is a jötunn and the personification of fire in Norse mythology. He is a son of the jötunn Fornjótr and the brother of Ægir or Hlér ('sea') and Kári ('wind'). Logi married fire giantess Glöð and she gave birth to their two beautiful daughters—Eisa and Eimyrja.

== Name ==
The Old Norse name Logi is generally translated as 'fire', 'flame', or blaze'. It was also used in poetry as a synonym of 'sword, blade'.

Since Logi is pitted against the god Loki in a story in the Gylfaginning section of the Prose Edda, it has been suggested that Loki was also associated with fire, but it is more likely to be wordplay. Loki has no provable connection to the German word Lohe ('blaze'), despite Richard Wagner's use of the name Loge for the demigod in his Ring des Nibelungen.

== Attestations ==
=== Gylfaginning ===
In Gylfaginning ('The Beguiling of Gylfi'), Logi appears in the tale of Thor and Loki's journey to the castle of the giant Útgarða-Loki in Jötunheimr, where Loki was pitted against Logi in an eating contest. The contestants appeared to be equal in speed at eating meat from the bone, but Logi also consumed the bones and even the wooden trencher in which the meat was placed showing off his might. Útgarða-Loki afterwards explained that Logi was really wildfire itself.

=== Hversu Noregr byggðist ===
In Hversu Noregr byggðist in Flateyjarbók, there is a mention of Logi's family:

There was a man called Fornjót. He had three sons; one was Hlér, another Logi, the third Kári; he ruled over winds, but Logi over fire, Hlér over the seas.

The sons of Fornjótr are given powers to rule over forces of nature. Logi rules over fire.

=== Þorsteins saga Víkingssonar ===
In Þorsteins saga Víkingssonar, Logi, also called Hálogi, is identified as a risi (another kind of giant) who becomes the first king of Hálogaland (northern Norway), and the ancestor of its royal line, all of whom are known for their muscular physique and stunning beauty.

The family tree of Logi according to Þorsteins saga Víkingssonar, Chapter 1

Kings are marked with a crown (♕).

♂ Raum ♕, of Raumaríki
KEY
♂ Grím of Grímsgard	♀ Alvör	♂ Alf the Old ♕, of Álfheim	♀ Bryngerð	Marriage or coupling
Parent and child
♂ Logi, aka Hálogi ♕, of Hálogaland	♀ Glöð
♂ Véseti	♀ Eisa	♀ Eimyrja	♂ Vífill
♂ Víking

== Legacy ==
A moon of planet Saturn is named Loge after Logi.
