= Abelvær =

Village in Nærøysund Municipality, Norway

- Village
- Interactive map of Abelvær
- Location within Trøndelag Location within Norway
- Coordinates: 64.7294°N 11.1801°E
- Country: Norway
- Region: Central Norway
- County: Trøndelag
- District: Namdalen
- Municipality: Nærøysund Municipality
- Elevation: 6 m (20 ft)
- Time zone: UTC+01:00 (CET)
  - Summer (DST): UTC+02:00 (CEST)
- Post Code: 7950 Abelvær

Abelvær is a fishing village in Nærøysund Municipality in Trøndelag county, Norway.

== Geography ==
The village is located on the small island of Kalvøya at the mouth of the Foldafjord. The village areas of Ramstad and Steine lie just to the northeast of Abelvær. There is a road connection to the mainland from Abelvær.

== Media gallery ==
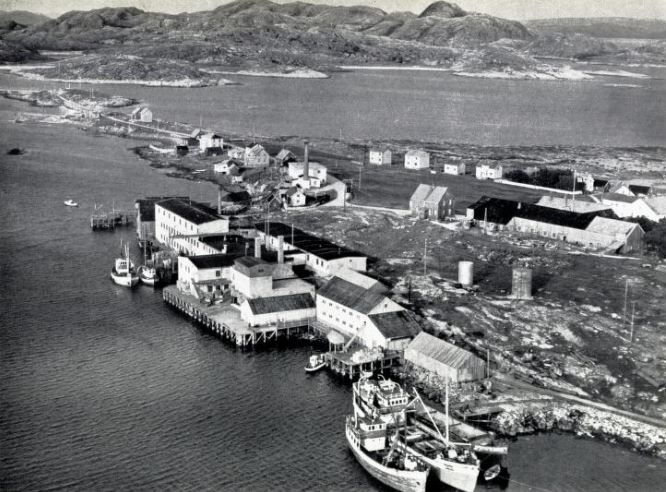

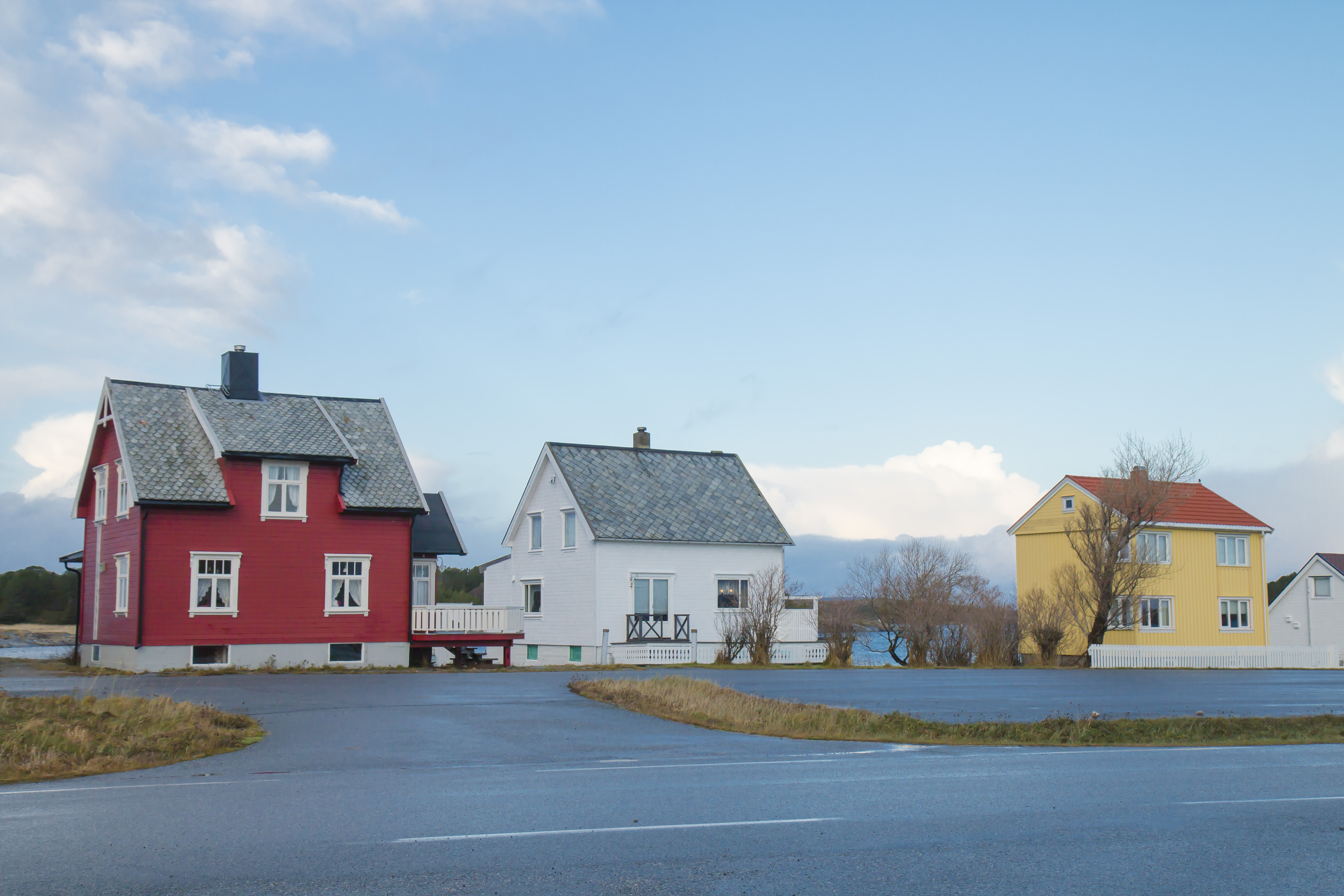

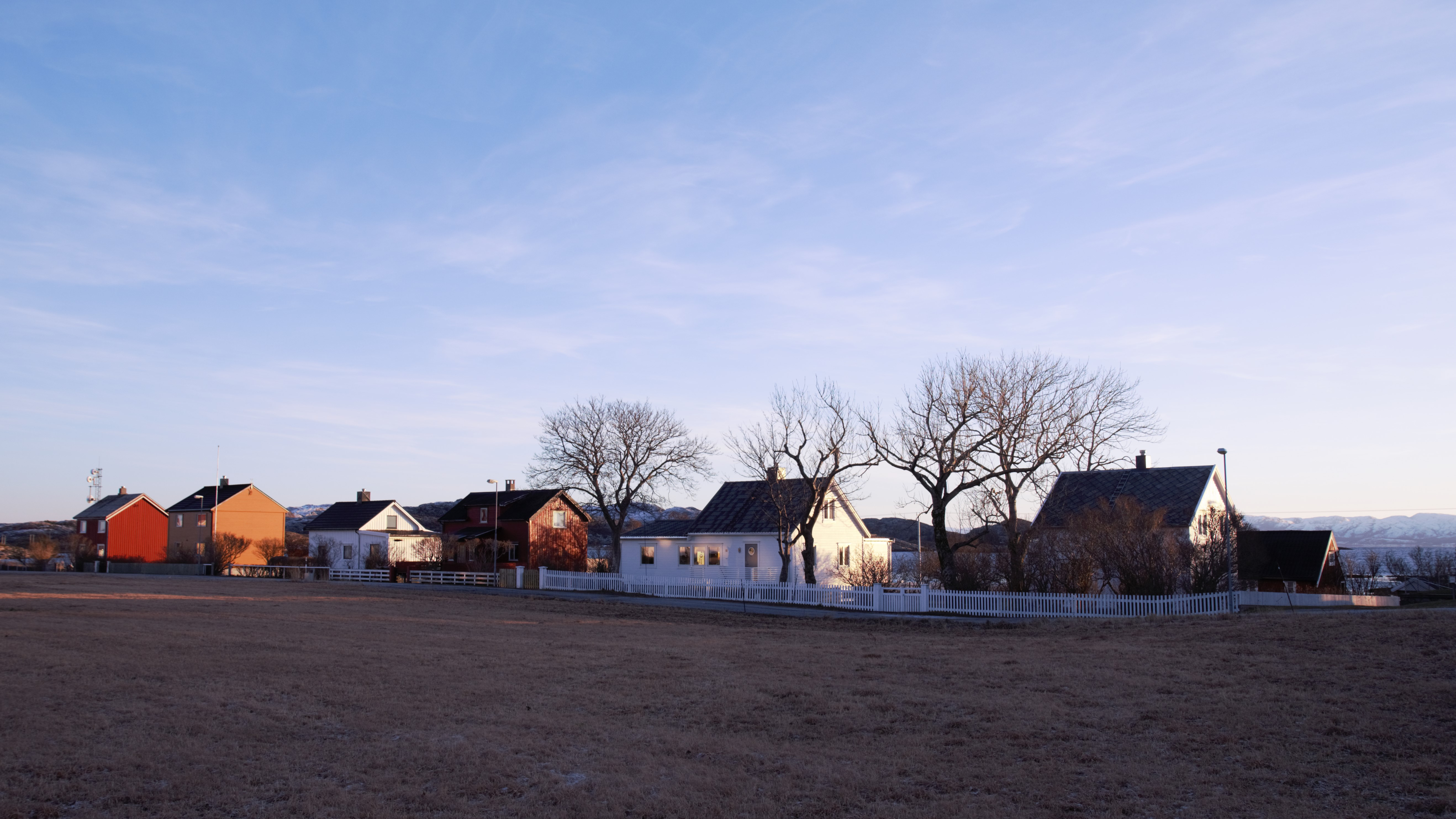

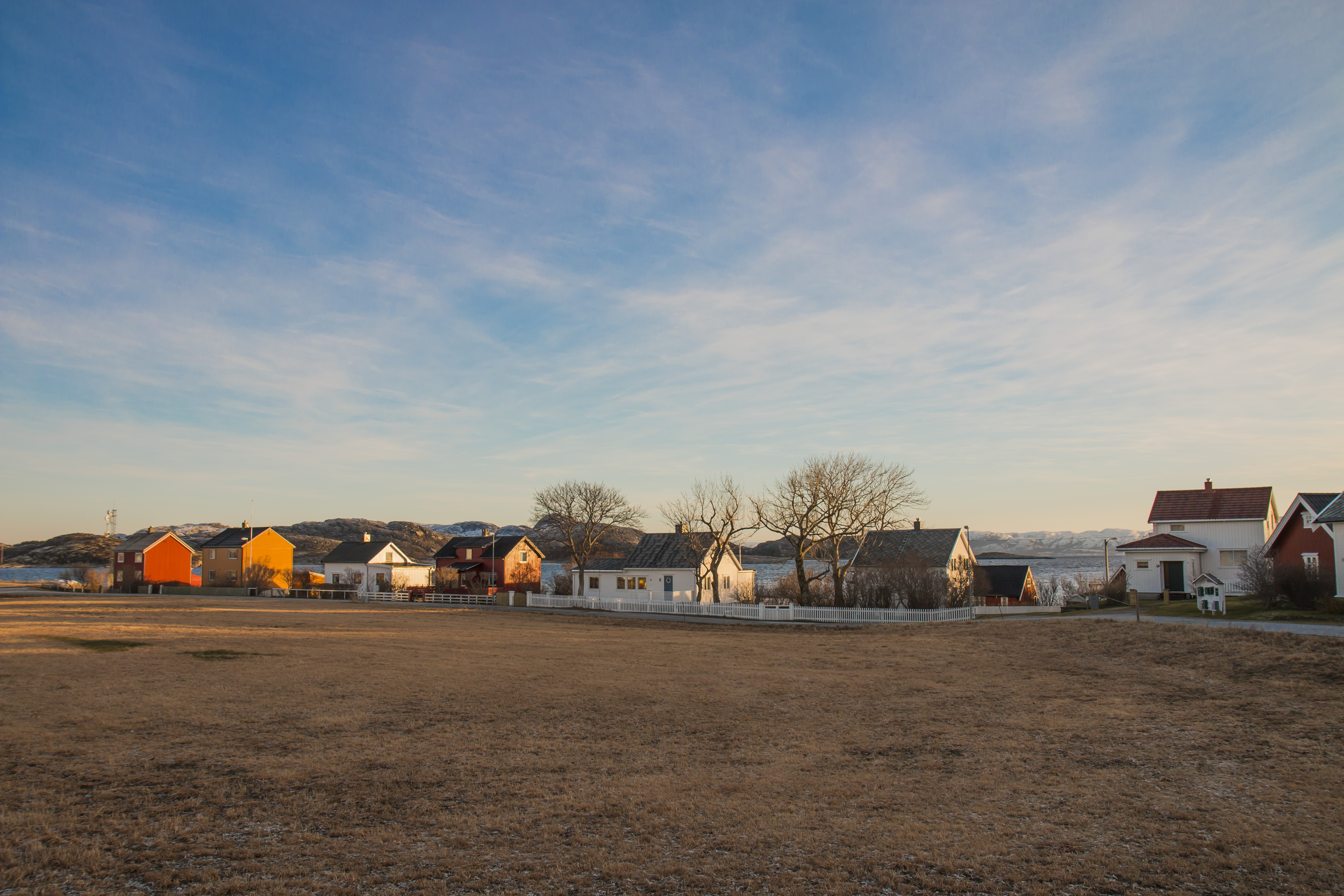

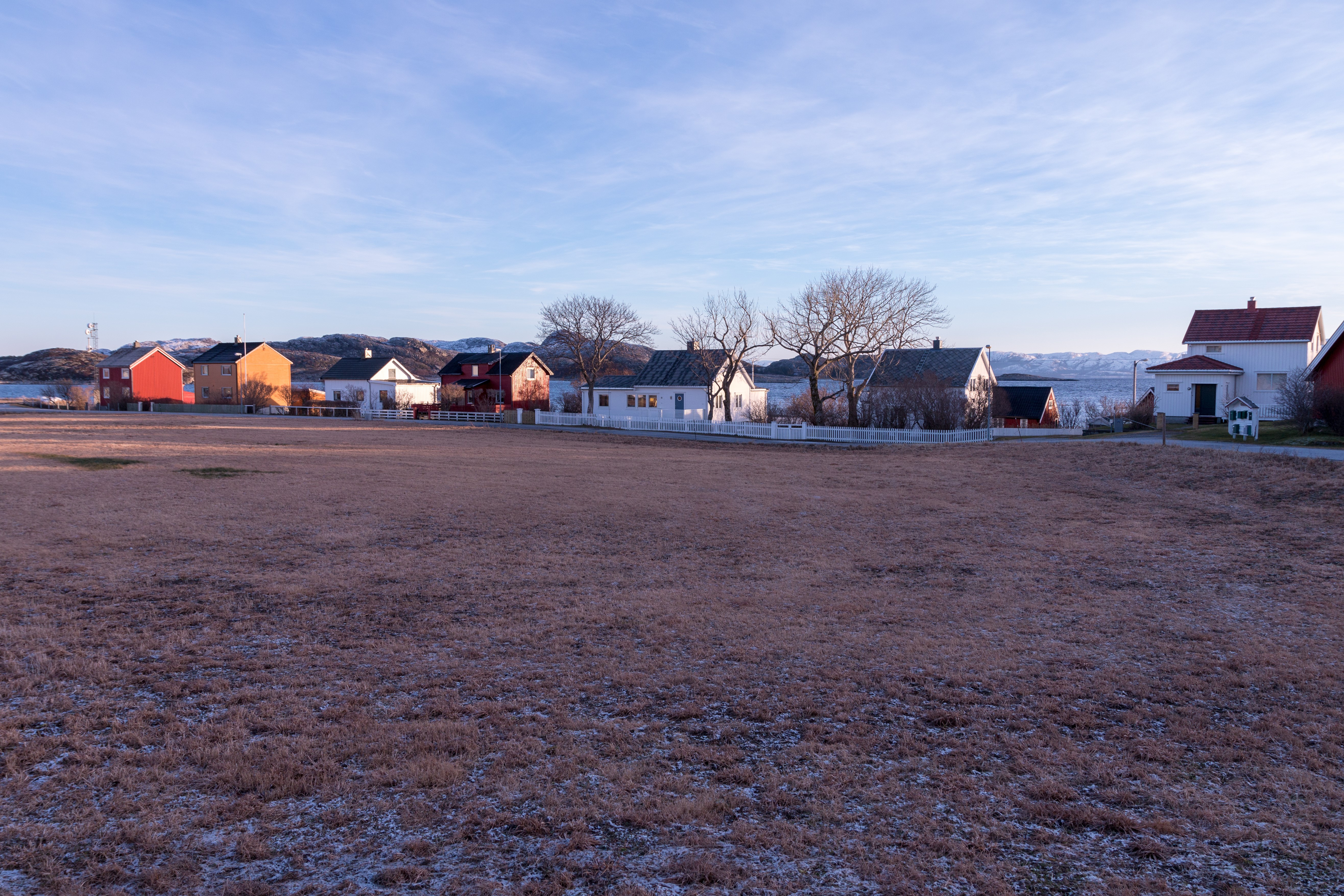

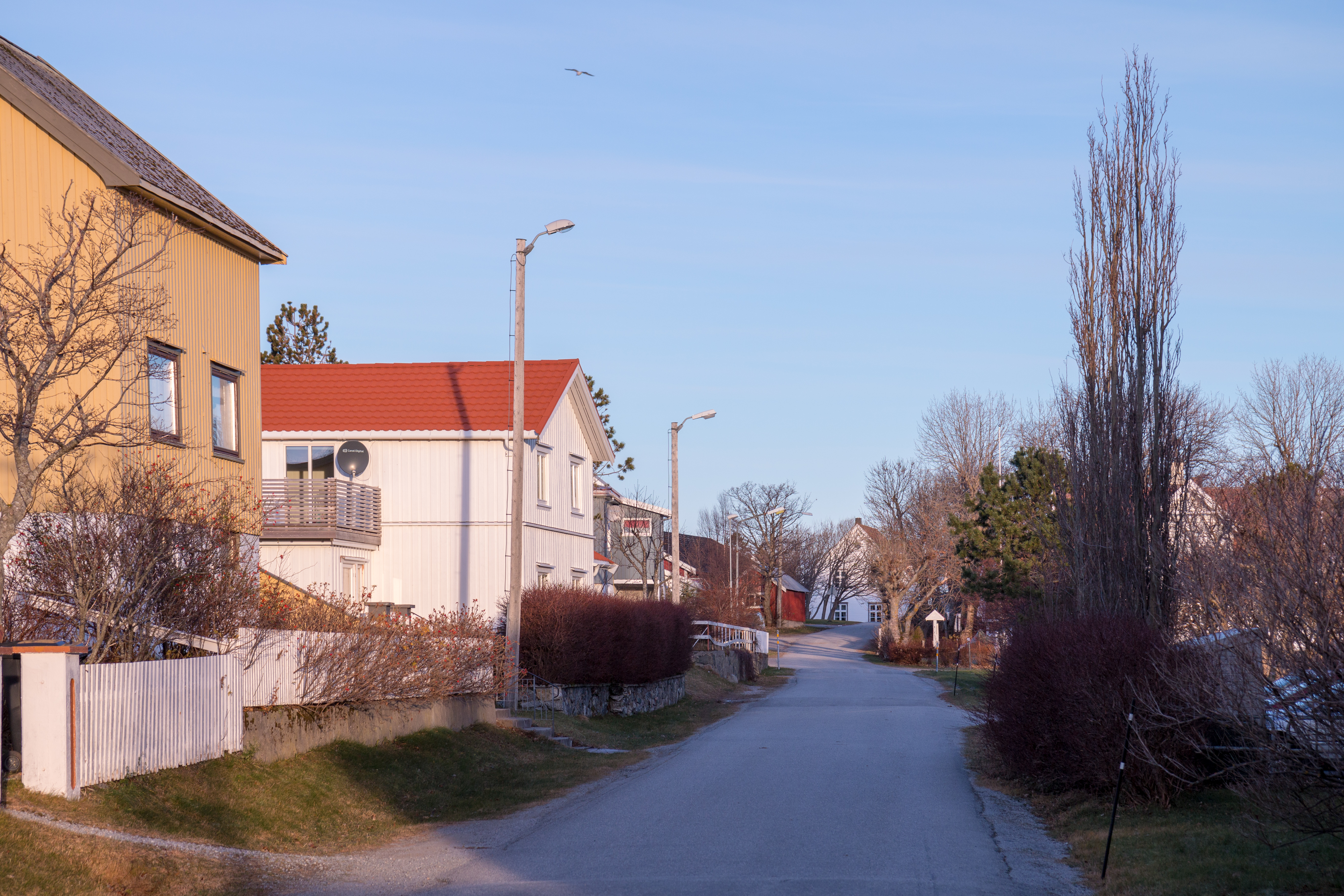

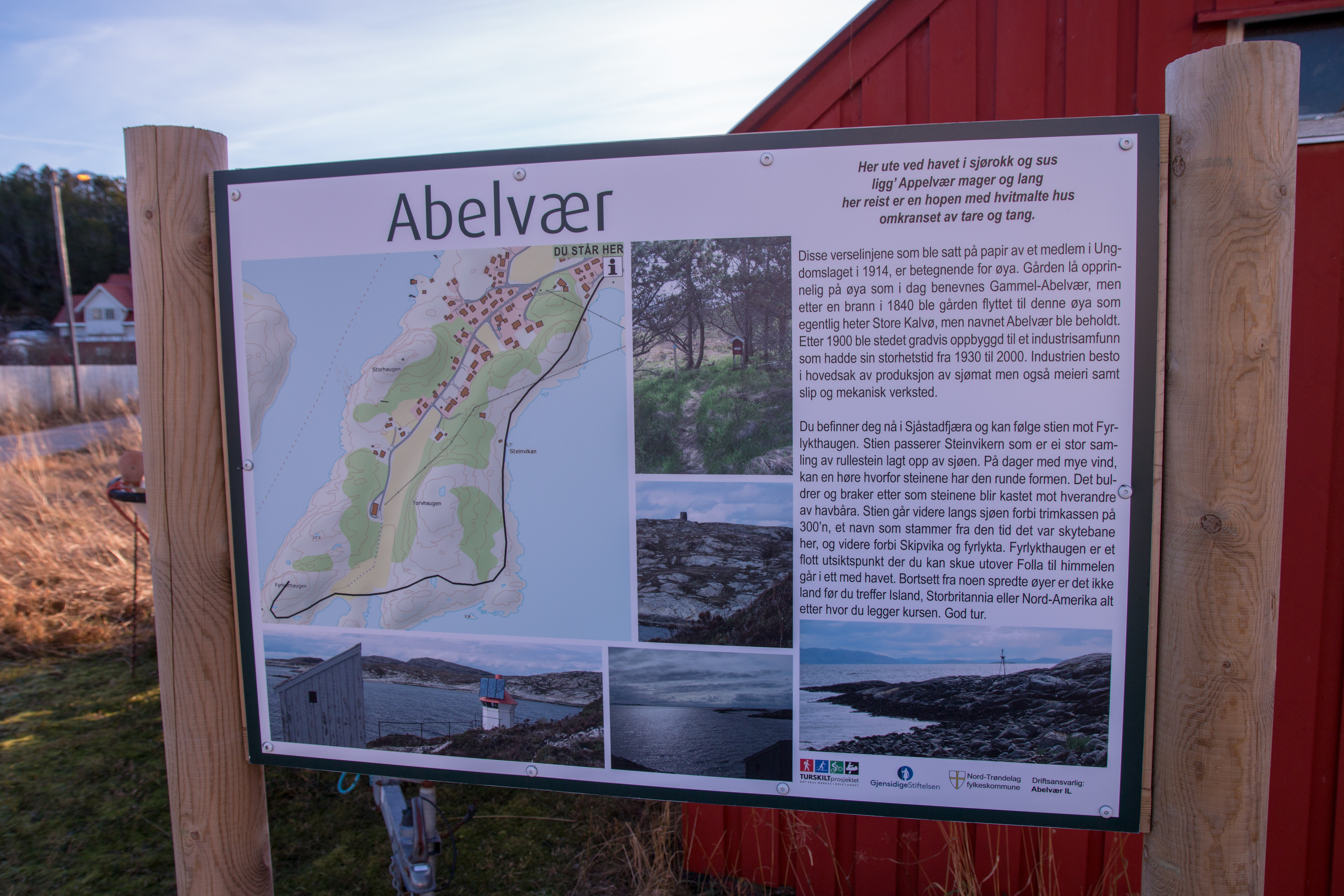

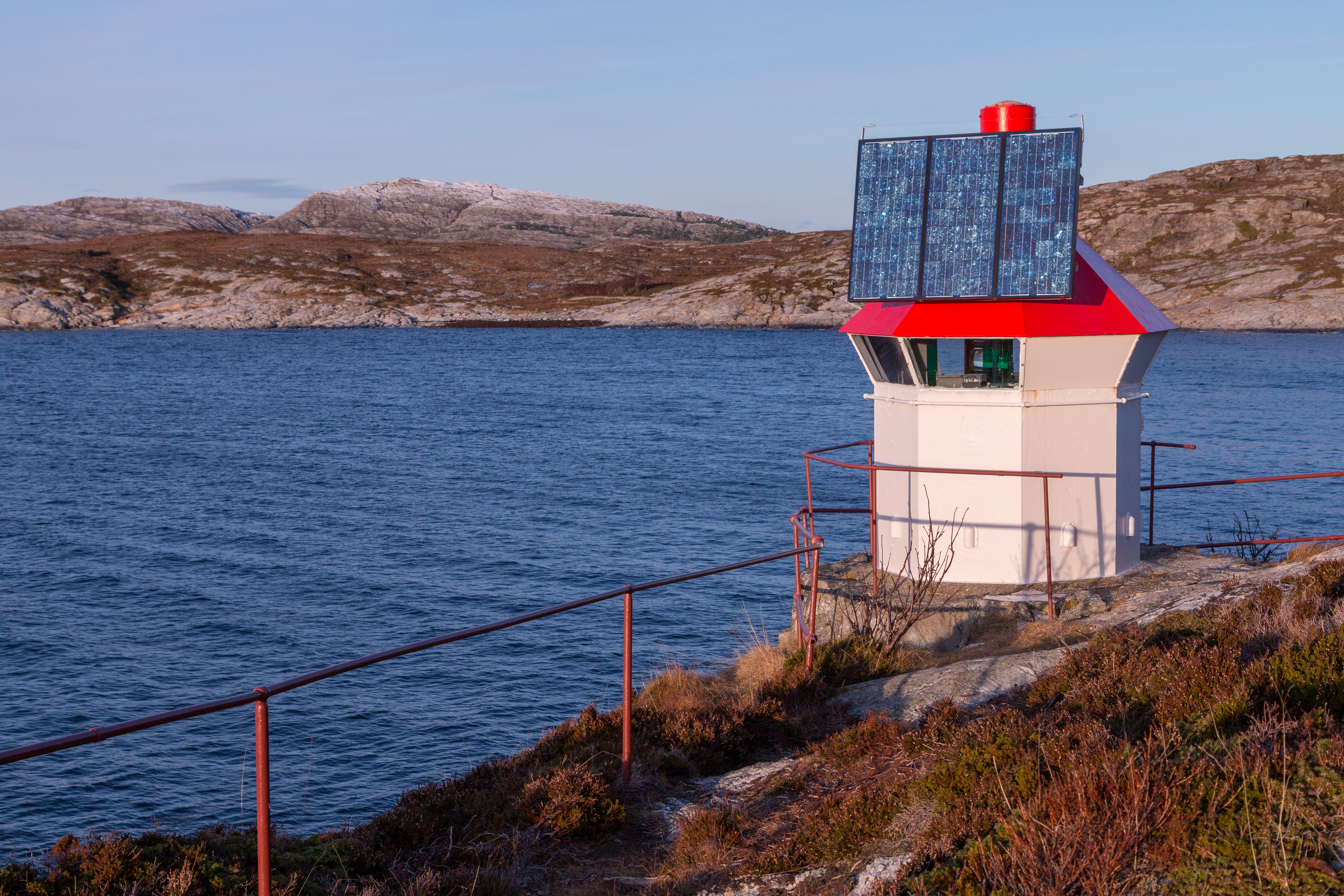

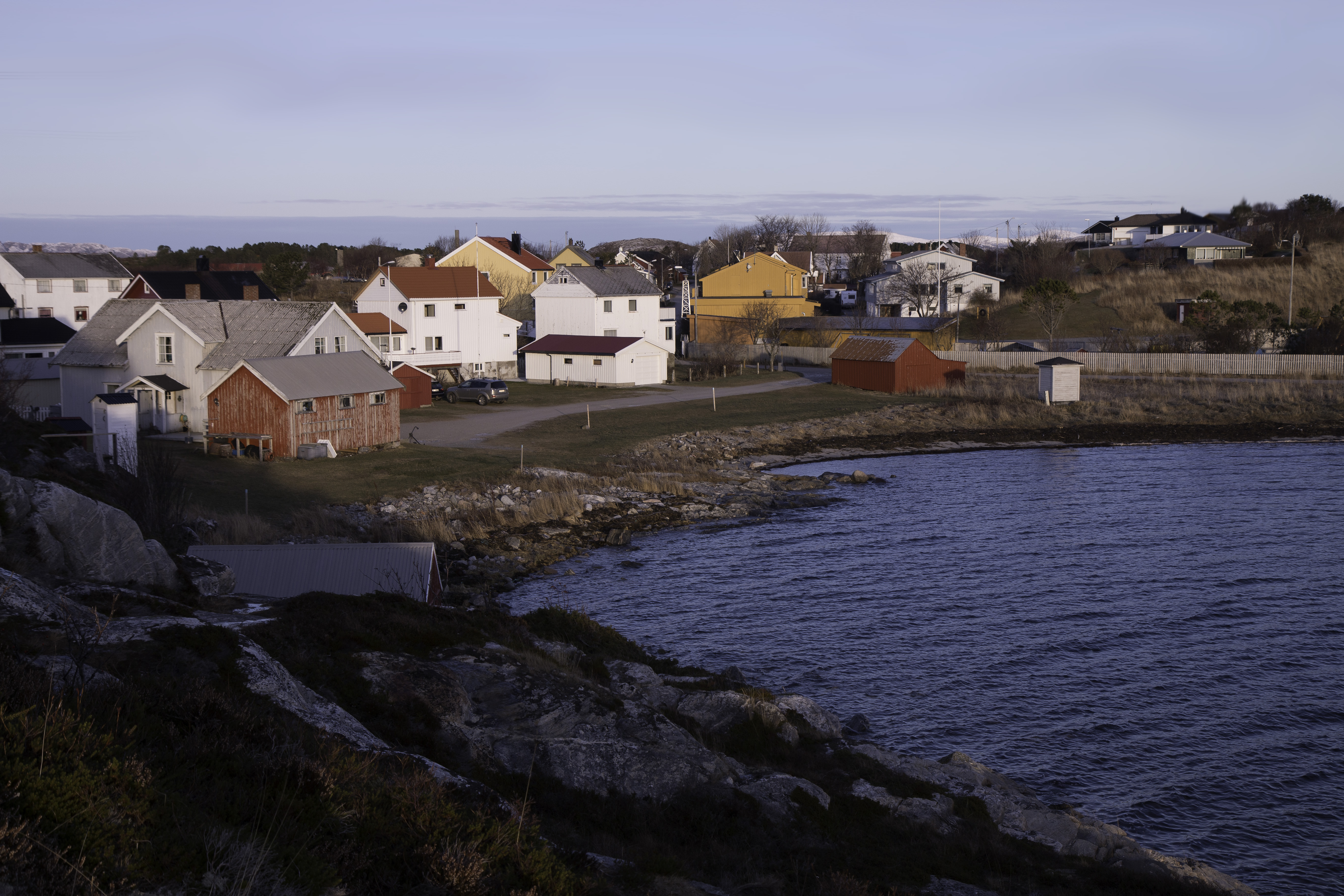

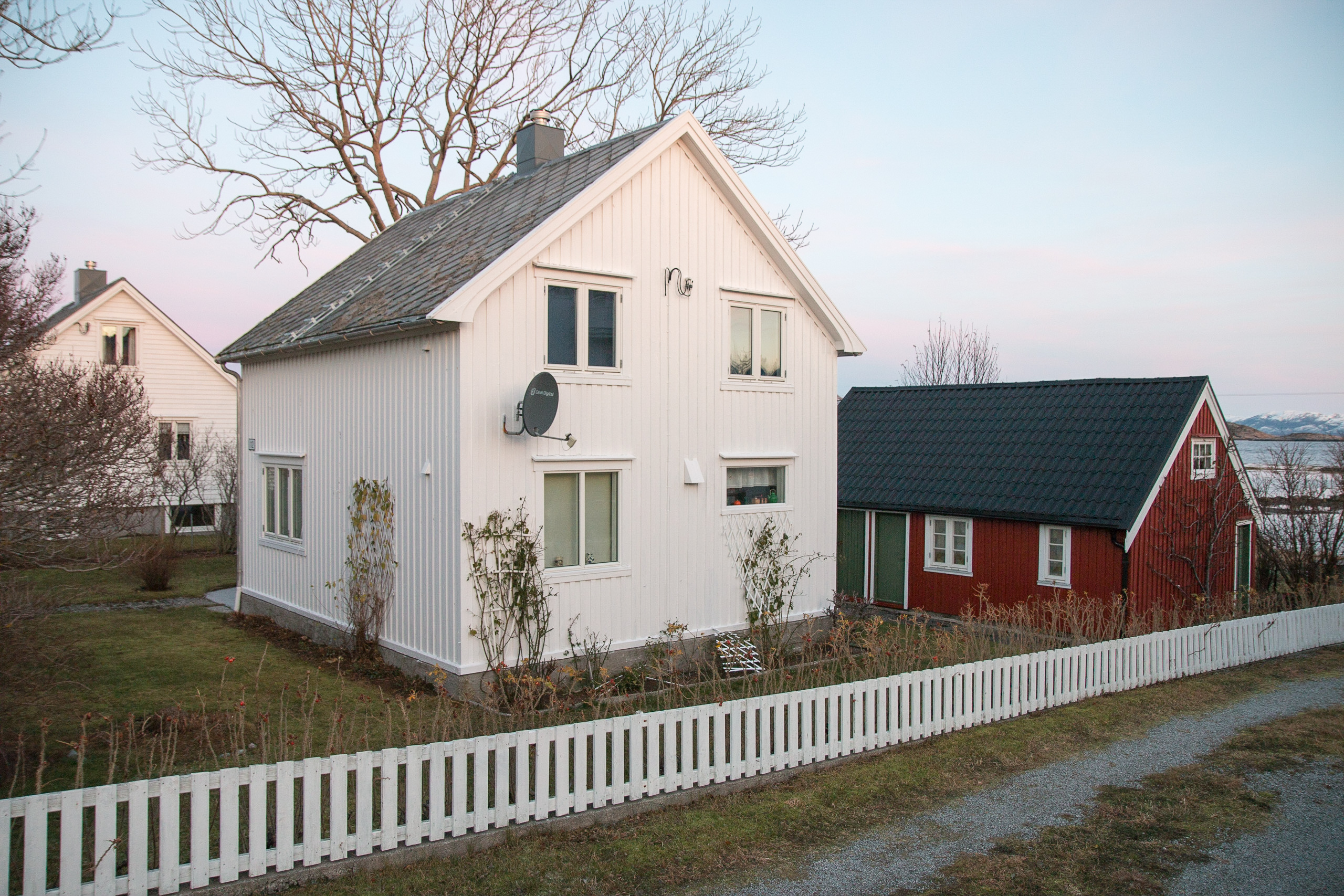
