= Þorsteins saga Víkingssonar =

Icelandic saga

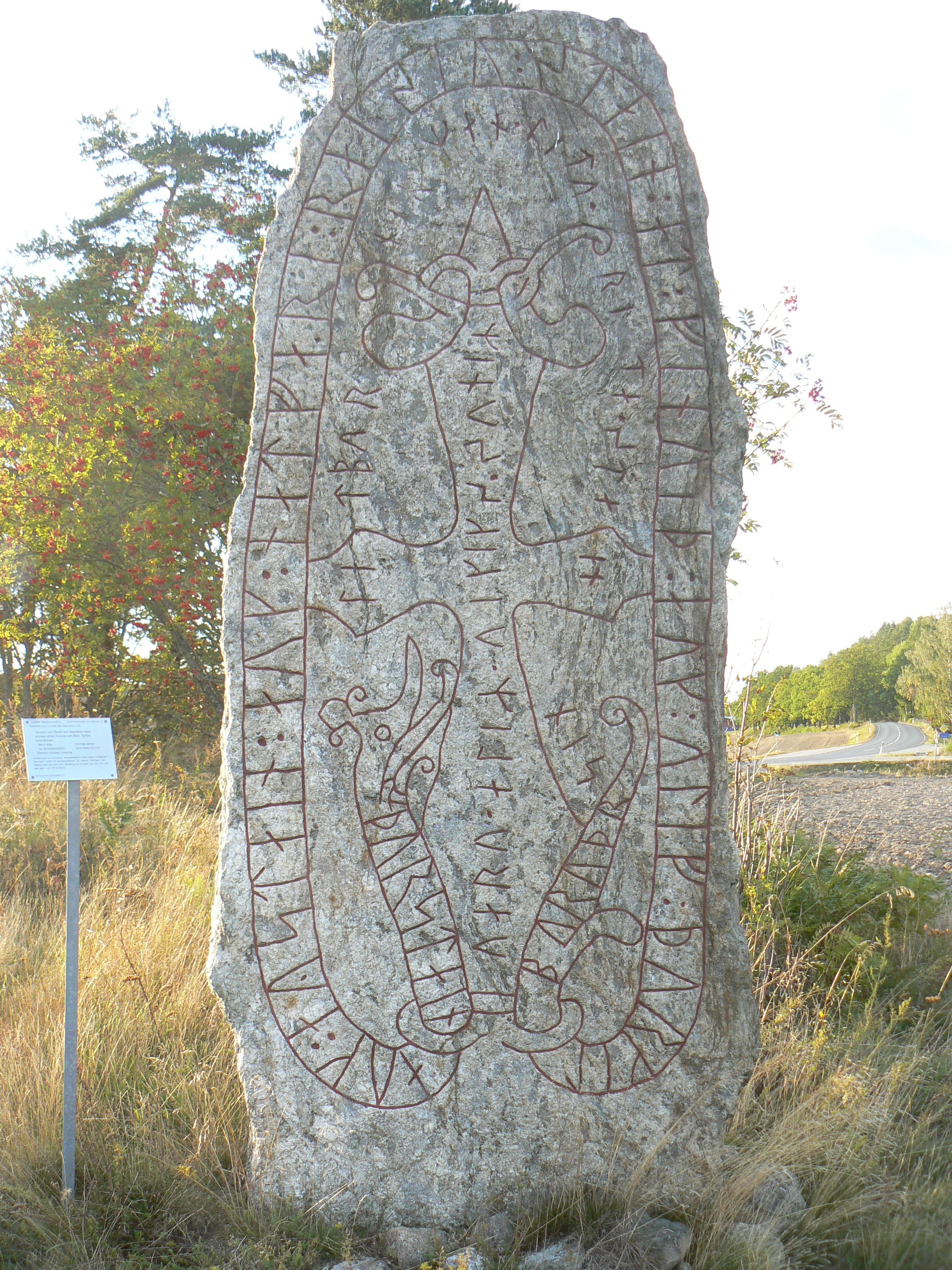
Sö 54

Þorsteins saga Víkingssonar or The Saga of Thorstein, Viking's Son is a legendary saga which takes place in the 7th century. It is about the father of Frithjof the Bold. It begins in Norway and Sweden (with locations such as Ulleråker), but continues into exotic places such as India. It is not one of the more famous sagas, but it is still considered to be an entertaining story. It is a prequel to Friðþjófs saga ins frœkna, The Saga of Fridthjof the Bold.

It has been compared to the runestone Sö 54 (sv) in Bjudby, Södermanland, Sweden, as it also mentions a prominent family, and besides the father Víkingr it names three sons with the same names as in the saga, and there are also close correspondences with the other names.

== Plot ==
The saga begins with the origin and adventures of Viking. At age 15, he is called to defend King Hring and his daughter Hunvor from a powerful man from India named Harek the Ironhead, whose background and family is also told. Viking is given the magic sword Angurvadel by his father, which is the only weapon that can kill Harek. Viking therefore kills Harek in a holmgang. Viking is betrothed to Hunvor, but chooses not to marry her immediately, instead to earn his renown by going to war and being a Viking. His return is delayed by Harek's family (his brothers and sister), who seek revenge for Harek's death and against whom Viking and his foster-brother Halfdan must contend. Eventually, Harek's family are defeated. Viking marries Hunvor, and Halfdan marries her handmaid Ingeborg, the daughter of jarl Herfinn. Hunvor dies after giving birth to a son, Hring, who will become king of Sweden. In Denmark, Viking and Halfdan encounter Njorfe, King of Upplands in Norway, and battle him at sea for many days; With no side clearly superior, Viking and Njorfe swear foster-brotherhood together.

Later, Viking sires nine sons by a second wife. Thorsten (Thorstein, or Thor's Stone) is the eldest son of Viking, and Thorer the second. Njorfe also has nine sons (although ten are named). When the eldest sons of each group are twenty years old, the two groups of sons are highly competitive against each other. After a brutal ball game, in which Thorer is injured by Olaf, the second son of Njorfe, Thorer stabs Olaf to death with his spear.

Viking scolds this son and sends him to an island in Lake Vänern. Thorsten objects, and he and the other brothers accompany Thorer to Vanern. Viking gives Thorsten the sword Angurvadel and tells Thorsten to wait quietly on the island until the danger is over. Njorfe's sons want revenge. They use magic to conjure a frost that freezes the lake and travel across it to attack the sons of Viking. Two of Viking's sons survive: Thorsten and Thorer. Two of Njorfe's sons survive, including his eldest son, Jokul, a sorcerer. Njorfe's sons use magic to discover that Thorsten and Thorer are alive.

Viking sends his two sons to the court of Halfdan for safety. Jokul invades Sogn, kills the king, banishes the heir Beli, and places a curse on the king's daughter Ingeborg, causing her to take the shape of a hideous troll. Jokul stirs a tempest which shipwrecks Thorsten twice. Ingeborg (as a troll, under the name Skellinefja) rescues Thorsten and asks him to promise to marry her. With her help, Thorsten returns Beli to the throne of Sogn, and the curse leaves Ingeborg. Thorsten unites with Ingeborg. Fridthiof is their son.

Thorsten, Beli, and Angantyr retrieve Viking's stolen magic ship Ellida. Thorsten fights Sote, a ghost pirate in a barrow mound, to get the magic ring (forged by Voland). Thorsten, Beli, and Angantyr conquer the Orkney Islands.

Thorsten and his son Frithiof inherit the magic sword Angurvadel and the magic ship Ellida from Viking. Descendants of Thorstein appear in Friðþjófs saga ins frœkna, and in the Starkad section of Gautreks saga.

The family tree of Thorstein according to Þorsteins saga Víkingssonar

Kings are marked with a crown (♕).

Raum ♂, ♕ of Raumaríki
KEY
Grím ♂, of Grímsgard	Alvör ♀	Alf the Old ♂, ♕ of Álfheim	Bryngerð ♀	Marriage or coupling
Parent and child
Logi, aka Hálogi ♂, ♕ of Hálogaland	Glöð ♀	Mæfils ♂, a sea-king ♕
Véseti ♂	Eisa ♀	Hring ♂, ♕ of a fylke of Sweden	Eimyrja ♀	Vífill ♂	Refill ♂, of Thruma
Meitálf ♂	Brennir ♂
Myndil ♂
Eirík ♂	Húnvör ♀	Víking ♂	Finna ♀
Skati ♂, ♕ of Sogn	Hring ♂, ♕ of Sweden	Finn, Úlf, Stein, Hrómund, Finnbogi, Eystein and Thorgeir ♂	Grím ♂
Beli ♂	Ingibjörg, aka Skellinefja ♀	Thorstein ♂	Thórir ♂	Thora ♀
Helgi ♂	Hálfdan ♂	Ingibjörg ♀	Véfreyja ♀	Friðthjóf ♂	Harald Kesia ♂

== See also ==
- Frithiof's Saga
