= Hrafn Haengsson =

Icelandic jurist and goði

Hrafn Hængsson (Old Norse: [ˈhrɑvn ˈhɛːŋɡsˌson]; Modern Icelandic: [ˈr̥apn̥ ˈhaiŋsˌsɔːn]) was a tenth-century Icelandic jurist and goði. He was the son of Ketil Haeng, one of the early settlers of Iceland, and his wife Ingunn.

Hrafn was one of the main parties responsible for the unification of Iceland under the Althing and was then appointed lawspeaker at the first Althing in 930 CE. He served in that capacity until 949.

== Resources ==
- Byock, Jesse; Medieval Iceland: Society, Sagas and Power. University of California Press (1988) ISBN 0-520-06954-4 ISBN 0-226-52680-1
