= Frithiof's Saga =

Icelandic legendary saga

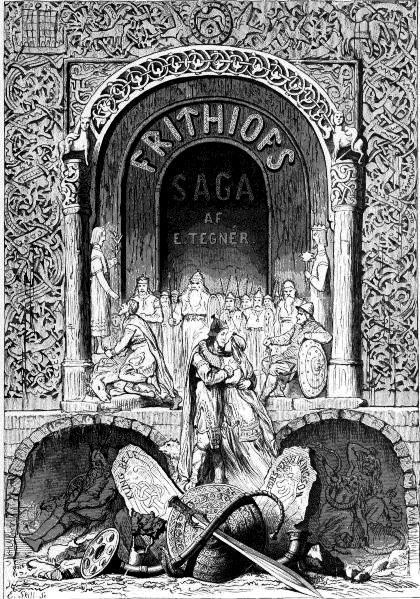
Title page of Frithiofs Saga a paraphrase by Esaias Tegnér (1876).

Frithiof's Saga (Old Norse: Friðþjófs saga ins frœkna) is a legendary saga from Iceland which in its present form is from ca. 1300. It is a continuation from The Saga of Thorstein Víkingsson (Þorsteins saga Víkingssonar). It takes place principally in Norway during the 8th century.

== Synopsis ==
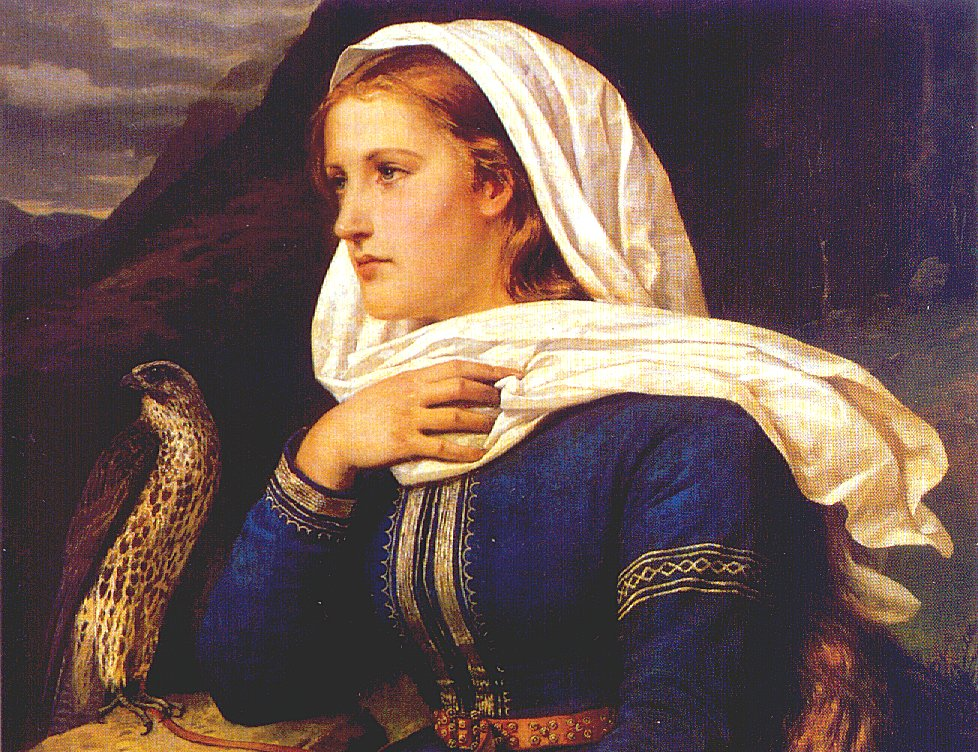
Peter Nicolai Arbo, Ingeborg, Frithjof's beloved, 1868

King Beli of Sogn (a traditional district in Western Norway) had two sons and a daughter named Ingeborg. Helgi was his first son, and Halfdan his second. On the other side of the fjord, lived the king's friend Thorstein (Þorsteinn Víkingsson) whose son Frithjof (Friðþjófr) was called the bold (hinn frœkni). Frithiof was the tallest, strongest and he was the bravest among men.

When the king's children were but young their mother died. A goodman of Sogn named Hilding (Hildingr), prayed to have the king's daughter to foster. Frithjof was the foster-brother to the king's daughter as he was also raised together with Ingeborg (Ingibjörg) by their foster-father Hilding.

Both Beli and Þorsteinn died in war whereupon Helgi and Halfdan took over the kingdom. The two kings were jealous of Frithjof's excellent qualities and so they denied him Ingeborg's hand. They took her to Baldr's sacred enclosure Baldrshagi where no one dared hurt another and where no woman and man had intercourse. Still Frithjof visited Ingeborg and they continued to love each other. This caused Helgi and Halfdan to send Frithjof away to Orkney to take tribute and while he was away they burnt down his homestead and married Ingeborg to King Ring, the aged king of Ringerike.

When Frithjof returned with the tribute, he burnt down Baldr's temple in Baldrshagi and went away to live as a Viking. After three years, he came to King Ring and spent the winter with him. Just before the old king died, Frithjof's identity was apparent to everybody and so the dying king appointed Frithjof earl and made him the care-taker of Ring's and Ingeborg's child.

When Ring had died, Frithjof and Ingeborg married and he became the king of Ringerike. Then he declared war on Ingeborg's brothers, killed Helgi and made Halfdan his vassal. Frithjof goes on to rule as king of the Sognfolk, and has many children with Ingeborg.

== Frithiof's Saga in translation ==
Frithiof's Saga had first been translated into Swedish in 1737. In 1820, Swedish writer Esaias Tegnér published a partial paraphrase in form of epic poetry in Iduna, the journal of the Geatish Society. In 1822, he composed five more cantos. In 1825 he published the entire poem Frithiof's Saga. Even before it was completed, it was famous throughout Europe; the aged Johann Wolfgang von Goethe took up his pen to commend to his countrymen this alte, kraftige, gigantischbarbarische Dichtart ("old, mighty, gigantic-barbaric style of verse"), and desired Amalie von Imhoff to translate it into German. This romantic paraphrase of an ancient saga was composed in twenty-four cantos, all using different poetic forms.

Norwegian Nobel Prize winner Jon Fosse has translated both Friðþjófs saga and its prequel, Þorsteins saga Víkingssonar, to nynorsk.

== Statue of Fridtjof ==
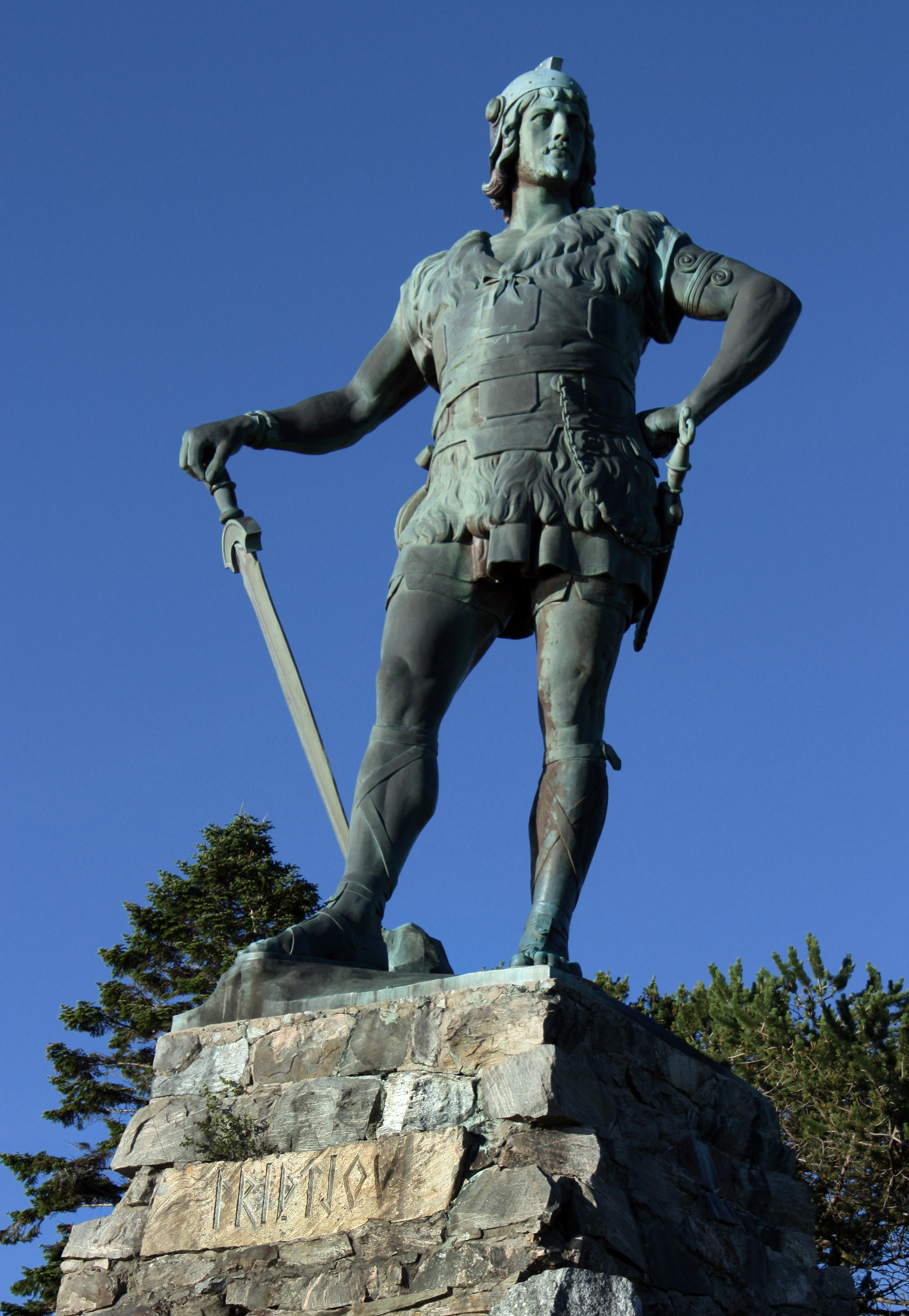
Max Unger, Statue of Fridtjof, 1913

Kaiser Wilhelm II of Germany had a statue of Fridtjof raised in the village of Vangsnes in Vik in the county of Sogn og Fjordane, Norway. The Statue of Fridtjof (Fridtjof den frøkne) is a landmark which towers 22.5 metres (74 ft) over the hilltop. It stands in a park overlooking the Sognefjord. The statue was sculpted by the German sculptor and art professor Max Unger (1854–1918) and was erected in July 1913. Wilhelm II also ordered in 1890 that a coastal defense ship be named Frithjof after the Norse hero.

== Frithiof's Saga in music ==
Frithjof's Saga was used as an inspiration by several composers. Examples include:

- Max Bruch's cantata Frithjof, opus 23, from 1864 – the first musical piece dedicated to the saga.
- The symphonic poem Frithjof (cataloged as his WoO 7) by Felix Draeseke. Although begun in 1859 it was completed in 1865. It is his first major orchestral work and takes over 40 minutes to perform.
- The Frithjof Symphony in E-flat major, Op. 22 (1874), by the German composer Heinrich Hofmann (not to be confused with the identically named and contemporaneous German painter). Arguably the most famous use of the saga in music, this piece was one of the most-played pieces in European concert halls at the end of the 19th century.
- The symphonic poem Fritjof's Meeresfahrt, opus 5 (1884), by the Dutch composer Johan Wagenaar.
- The opera Frithiof from 1892 by Théodore Dubois. Its overture has been recorded.
- The opera Fritjof (1895) by the Dutch composer Cornelis Dopper. It was never performed.
- Swedish composer Elfrida Andrée wrote an opera to a libretto by Selma Lagerlöf based on the poem, also called Frithjof's Saga; it was never performed publicly, but selections from the opera received a private hearing in 1898. In the manuscript score of the work, two arias and a chorus are translated into German, suggesting that Andrée may have sought their performance for a German audience. Andrée reworked music from the opera into a five-movement suite, Fritiov-svit that has seen performance as recently as 1995 in Sweden and was recorded on CD.
