= Gríms saga loðinkinna =

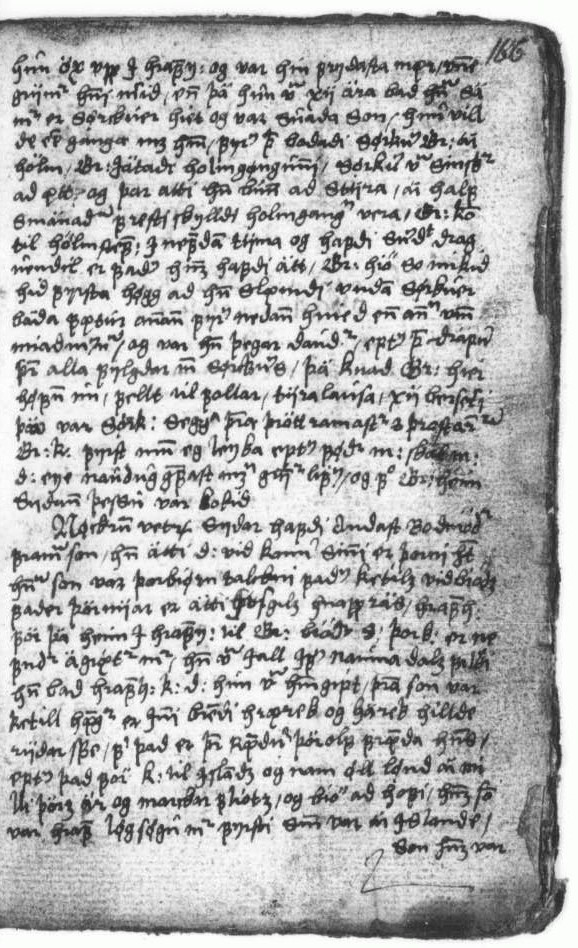
Gríms saga loðinkinna AM 109 a II 8°x folio

Gríms saga loðinkinna, or The Saga of Grim Shaggy-Cheek is one of the legendary sagas. It is from the 14th century and takes place in eighth-century Norway. It is one of the sagas called the Hrafnistumannasögur surrounding Ketill Hængr and his relatives.

Grimr Loðinkinni (Shaggy Cheek) was the son of Ketill Hængr (Salmon). From birth, one of his cheeks was covered with dark hair and that area was impervious to weapons. He ruled over most of Halogaland, a province in northern Norway, and traveled south to betroth Lofthæna, daughter of Harald, a powerful ruler in the Oslofjjord. Seven nights before the wedding, Lofthæna mysteriously disappears. On a subsequent trip to Finnmark in the far north, Grímr vanquishes two trolls in a cave encounter and then loses all his men in a pitched battle over a beached whale. Close to death himself, a hideous troll woman offers to help him, but only if he will kiss her and lie with her at night. He awakes to find Lofthæna, who had been transformed to an ogress by a curse of Grímhild, her wicked step-mother. They return to the Oslo Fjord, have Grímhild stoned to death, and marry. Years later their beautiful, 12-year-old daughter, Brynhildr, is wooed by the land owner Sörkvir. Angered by her rejection the unwelcome suitor challenges Grímr and his men to a duel on an island (holmgangr) and shows up with eleven berserkers. Grímr dispatches Sörkvir and his shield bearer with one blow and he and his men kill the berserkers. The remainder of the saga mentions numerous descendants of Grímr.

Besides the many folktale motifs and seven skaldic stanzas, of special interest in this short saga is the cave encounter with a troll pair, not just because it can be linked to the Bear's Son Folktale, but also because it contains a verbal parallel there to Hálfdanar saga Brönufóstra showing that both sagas were using a common, written source.

== Bibliography ==
- Ohlmarks, Åke (1993). Fornnordiskt Lexikon. Stockholm: Tiden. ISBN 9155040446.
- Waggoner, Ben (2012). The Hrafnista Sagas. New Haven, CT: Troth Publications. ISBN 978-0557729418.
