= Ramstad, Trøndelag =

Village in Nærøysund Municipality, Norway

Ramstad Ramsta
- Village
- Interactive map of Ramstad
- Location within Trøndelag Location within Norway
- Coordinates: 64.7452°N 11.2323°E
- Country: Norway
- Region: Central Norway
- County: Trøndelag
- District: Namdalen
- Municipality: Nærøysund Municipality
- Elevation: 15 m (49 ft)
- Time zone: UTC+01:00 (CET)
  - Summer (DST): UTC+02:00 (CEST)
- Post Code: 7950 Abelvær

Ramstad (Old Norse: Hrafnista) is a small farming village in Nærøysund Municipality in Trøndelag county, Norway. The village is located about half-way between the villages of Abelvær and Steine on an island near the mouth of the Foldafjord.

It was the home of a family from which came several heroes in a group of legendary sagas called the Hrafnistumannasögur. The islands of Nærøy were an old central meeting place, not only for the people of Namdalen, but also for people from neighbouring districts.

== See also ==
- Sölve, another legendary Norse hero from Nærøy.
