= Dux Mogontiacensis =

Western Roman military office

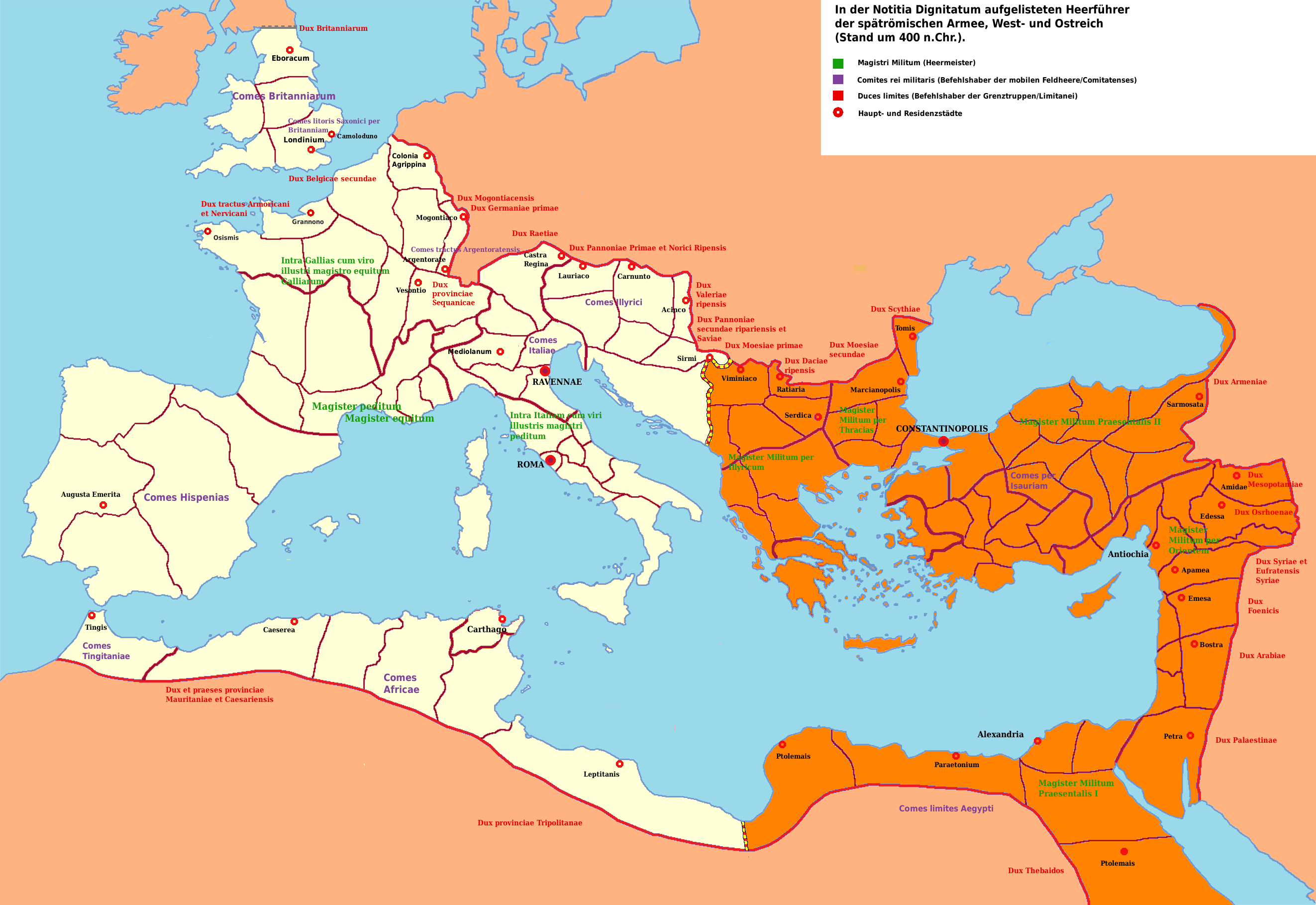
Commander of the Comitatenses and Limitanei in the 5th century AD

The Dux Mogontiacensis (English: Commander of the Mainz Region) was a high-ranking officer in the late antique army of the Western Roman Empire and commander-in-chief of the border army (Limitanei) in the province of Germania prima.

== Definition, function, and command area ==
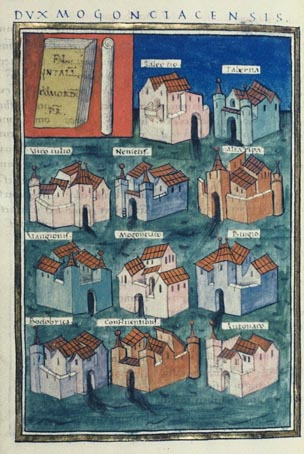
Notitia dignitatum: The forts and fortified cities of Salectium (Saletium, Seltz), Tabernae (Rheinzabern), Vicus Iulius (Germersheim), Nemetum (Speyer), Altaripa (Altrip), Vangionum (Civitas Vangionum, Worms), Mogontiacum (Mainz), Bingium (Bingen), Bodobrica (Boppard), Confluentes (Koblenz) and Antonaco (Antunnacum, Andernach), which were under the command of Mogontiacensis.

The office is mentioned exclusively in the Notitia dignitatum. The Dux Mogontiacensis was subordinate to the magister peditum praesentalis (commander-in-chief of the infantry) of the Western Empire. At the imperial court, the Dux belonged to the highest rank class of the viri spectabiles. The military district of the Dux Mogontiacensis included the Rhine border between Seltz and Andernach.

== Development ==
Around the year 300, Diocletian (284–305) reorganized the provinces and separated the civil and military administration. From the middle of the 4th century, there were repeated invasions by the Alamanni, who temporarily occupied areas and garrisons on the left bank of the Rhine. The field army was under the command of the Comes per utramque Germaniam. Initially, the defense of the border in the province of Germania Prima was the responsibility of the Dux Germaniae Primae. Towards the end of the 4th or beginning of the 5th century, his area of command was divided between the Dux Mogontiacensis, who belonged to the Roman knighthood, and the Comes tractus Argentoratensis, with its seat in Mainz and Strasbourg respectively.

From 369 onwards, Emperor Valentinian I (364–375) once again carried out a comprehensive building programme to reinforce the Danube-Iller-Rhine Limes and fortified or rebuilt the garrison sites of the Mainz dukedom. The new Limitan units were detached from infantry legiones palatinae (guards) and comitatenses as well as Auxilia palatina of the Gallic field army and transferred to the Rhine. The individual units had a team strength of about 400 men. According to another view, the Mainz ducat was not established until 396 by Stilicho, on the occasion of a trip to the Rhine or possibly after the Germanic invasion of 406/407.

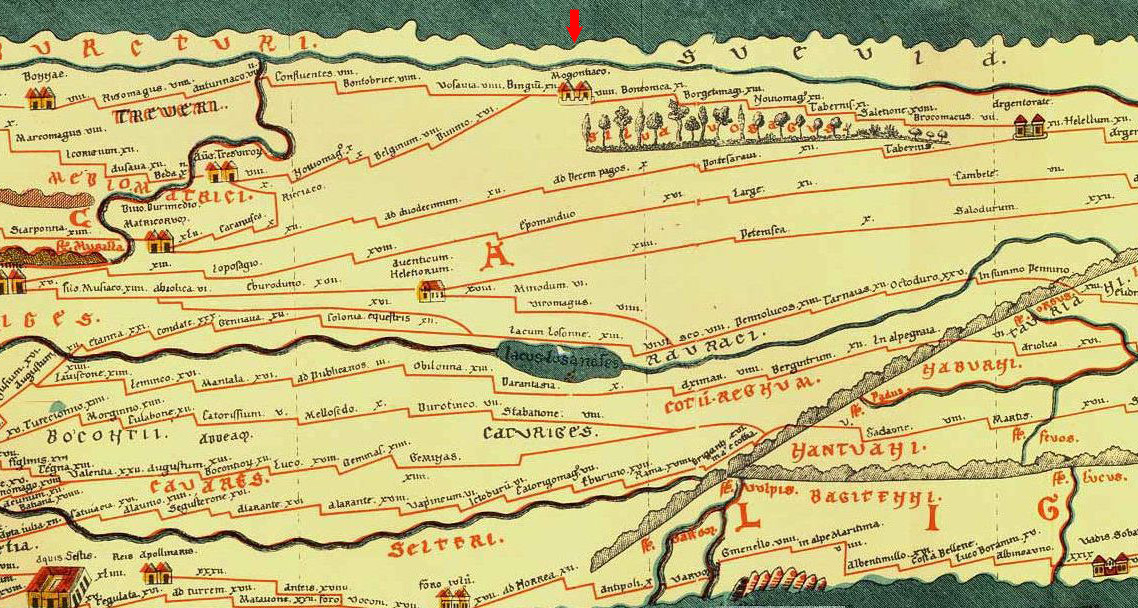
The Tabula Peutingeriana shows the castles of the Dux Mogontiacensis at the top of the picture

In older research, the view was mostly held that the Roman border defence in the area of the Mainz ducat had been largely destroyed by the invading Vandals, Alans, and Suevi in 406/407 and that the remaining units were incorporated into the mobile field army. In recent research, some have expressed the opinion that the Roman administration, supported by Burgundian foederates, existed until the middle of the 5th century, until the end of the Western Roman Empire in 476/480.

== Administrative staff ==
The Officium (administrative staff) of the Dux comprised the following offices:

- Princeps ex officiis magistrorum militum praesentalium alternis annis (Head of the Chancellery, appointed annually by the Magister militum)
- Numerarius a parte peditum semper (Treasurer from the army)

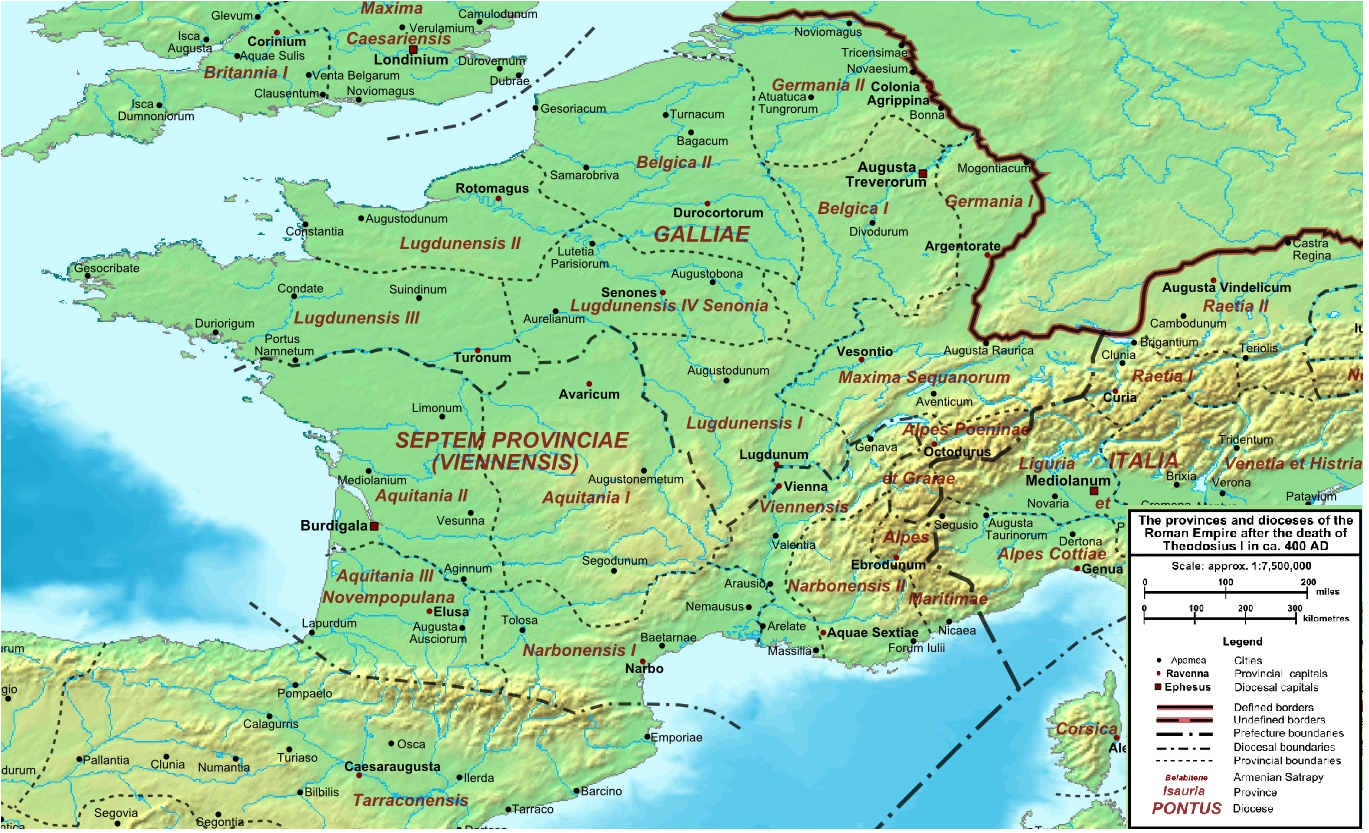
The provinces of the diocese of Gaul at the beginning of the 5th century

- Commentariensis a parte peditum semper (Accountant, legal expert from the army)
- Adiutor (Helper)
- Subadiuva (subordinate helpers)
- Regerendarius (Administration)
- Exceptores (Lawyers)
- Singulares et reliqui officiales (Guard and other officials)

== Troops ==
In addition to the administrative staff, the Dux had eleven prefects and the limitanei units they commanded at his disposal (sub dispositione). The troop list probably represents the number of troops under Constantine III (407–411) or Constantius III (from 412 the actual regent). In addition, there were other forts, such as Alteium (Alzey Castle), in which foederates (allies) were stationed, but these were not included in the Notitia dignitatum as non-Roman or irregular troop units. The origin of the troops – as well as the time of their stationing – is controversial in research.

== Distribution of numbers ==
The Notitia Dignitatum still contains the old officer ranks and organizational structures from the first Tetrarchy, which remained valid until the collapse of the Western Empire. The following officer rank is listed among the units subordinate to the Dux:

Praefectus (commander): In the late Roman army, this rank referred to both a commander of a cavalry or fleet unit (praefectus classis) and an infantry cohort. In the imperial period, this rank was awarded to the commanders of the auxiliary troop cohorts, while the officers of the cavalry units were referred to as praefecti equitum. In the middle imperial period, a praefectus commanded cavalry units of various strengths, such as ala quingenaria (500 men) and ala miliaria (1000 men), the latter of which was rather rare. In such cases, the praefectus outranked other auxiliary commanders. The rank was usually held by members of the knightly class, who belonged to the Roman upper class and had the necessary wealth and status to command larger contingents of troops.

During the chaotic conditions in the middle of the 3rd century, aristocrats were removed from military positions. Instead of the senatorial legati, the legions were now commanded by a praepositus agentes vice legati or praefectus legionis, and now men from lower social classes could also be promoted. The military rank was abolished in the late 4th century AD when the Roman army was reorganized once again. Praefecti then served, among other things, as quartermasters general at the court of the emperor. Under Constantine I (312–337), the four praetorian prefects were also relieved of their military functions, but they retained their judicial and financial responsibilities and were among the highest officials of the imperial administration.

According to the ND Occ. the Dux had the following units at his disposal:

Officers/Units/Castles	Remark	Picture
	Limitanei	
Praefectus militum Pacensium in Saletium.	This unit emerged from the Legio I Flavia Pacis and soon after 406/407 replaced the Milites Cornacenses, which had been transferred to the Rhine by Valentinian I around 370 and which in turn had emerged from parts of the equestrian force of the Equites Dalmatae stationed in Cornacum (Sotin), which were under the command of the Dux Pannoniae secundae ripariensis et Saviae. Pacensis was a city in the south of Portugal, the Colonia Civitas Pacensis, today's Beja. The soldiers in Saletium could also come from a division that was once stationed there. The shield design of Legio I Flavia Pacis probably depicts a four-spoked wheel.	Troop list of the Magister Peditum: Shield sign of the Prima Flavia Pacis
Praefectus militum Menapiorum in Tabernae	The soldiers of this unit were members of the tribe of the Menapii, whose territory was in present-day Belgium, the Civitas Menapiorum; this administrative unit later became the Civitas Turnencensium. The Milites Menapii probably emerged from the Comitatensian Menapii seniores, which were under the command of the Magister equitum Galliarum. On her shield was painted a snake-like figure, probably the roughly simplified representation of a Draco.	Troop list of the Magister Peditum: Sign of the Menapii seniores
Praefectus militum Anderetianorum in Vicus Iulius	Transferred to the Rhine by Constantine III (407–411) around 408, they replaced the portisienses stationed in Pfortz by Valentinian I. In the Notitia, another troop bears this name, which could indicate that both units were previously stationed in the Saxon coastal fort of Anderitum (Pevensey). These are the marines under the Praefectus classis Anderetianorum, stationed in Parisius (Paris).	Sign unknown
Praefectus militum Vindicum in Nemetum	The ancestral unit of the Milites Vindices can be seen in the Vindices, an Auxilium palatinum of the Magister militum praesentalis II of the Eastern Empire erected around 364. Brick stamps of this unit suggest that the Auxilium ceded soldiers around 369–370 to reorganize the Rhine border. It could be traced back to at least 422/423 in Speyer. The name Vindices is purely functional and means "the defenders, protectors" or "avengers". It refers neither to a tribe nor to a personality. One of the units under the command of the Magister militum praesenatlis I are the Defensores, which can also be translated as "the defenders". These have a very similar shield motif. The shield painting of the vindices shows a purple, two-headed zoomorphic motif on an ochre background, which is very common in the notitia, especially in the units of the Auxilia palatina. In two of the surviving manuscripts of the Notitia, a small ribbon-like motif can be seen at the top of the shield. It could be either a winner's wreath or a staurogram. On the upper edge of late Roman shields, small insignia or the like were often depicted. A similar pattern to the one used by the Vindices is also depicted on a Roman weight measure from the 4th century (in the form of a small statue of Constantine I armed with a shield). It is now in the art collection of Princeton University. The shield also shows a zoomorphic motif with a Christian Staurogram.	Troop list of the Magister militum praesentalis II: Signs of the Vindices
Praefectus militum Martensium in Alta Ripa	The Milites Martenses probably emerged from the pseudocomitatensian Martenses seniores/iuniores, which were under the command of the Magister equitum Galliarum also from the Legio I Flavia Martis or Legio I Martia.	Troop list of the Magister Peditum: Shield of the Martenses
Praefectus militum secundae Flaviae in Vangionum	This unit may have originated from a comitatensian part of the Legio II Flavia Constantia in the Gallic Field Army or the Legio II Flavia Virtutis, which is not documented anywhere else. Under the rule of the Constantinian dynasty, many new units were formed in the middle of the 4th century, including the Constantiaci. It is possible that the men of the Praefectus militum secundae Flaviae were members of this troop. Their absence in the Gallic field army, in contrast to most other units under the command of the Mainz Dux, could be due to a copying error. It is more likely, however, that the Constantiaci were dispersed or destroyed in the course of the barbarian invasion of 406/407. Its shield sign apparently shows two stylized horns, an indication that it was originally only an auxiliary force (Auxilia) and not a legionnaire formation. None of the legions mentioned in the Notitia had such a motive. If this is the case, this unit may have first advanced to Pseudocomitatenses, distinguished itself in the army of the usurper Constantine III, and in return was enlisted in his guard as Palatinae.	Troop list of the Magister Peditum: Shield of the Constantiaci
Praefectus militum Armigerorum in Mogontiacum	The Milites Armigeri may have been formed from the Armigeri propugnatores seniores or iuniores, two Legiones palatinae of the Comes Africae, or from the Comitatensian Armigeri defensores seniores of the Magister equitum Galliarum. The Legio XXII Primigenia can also be considered as the original unit. Armigeri probably means "the armoured". Another explanation would be that it is an honorary title for special merits. Defensores stands for "defenders" or particularly strong or steadfast soldiers; as well as the designation propugnates, which carry the two African armigeri units. Despite the great similarity of the shield pattern of the Armigeri defensores seniores to the Chinese-Taoist Yin and Yang, it first appears in Chinese sources about 700 years after the compilation of the Notitia dignitatum.	Troop list of the Magister Peditum: Sign of the Armigeri defensores seniores
Praefectus militum Bingensium in Bingio	The Milites Bingenses were probably separated from the Bingenses of the Gallic field army or from a vexillation of the Legio XXII Primigenia.	Sign unknown
Praefectus militum Balistariorum in Bodobrica	The Milites Ballistarii (Artillerymen) emerged from the Comitatensian Ballistarii, which were under the command of the Magister equitum Galliarum.	Sign unknown
Praefectus militum Defensorum in Confluentes	The Milites Defensores emerged from the pseudocomitatensian Defensores seniores or Defensores iuniores, which were under the command of the Magister equitum Galliarum.	Sign unknown
Praefectus militum Acincensium in Antunnacum	The Milites Acincenses probably emerged from the Acincenses of the Magister equitum Galliarum or directly from the Legio II Adiutrix, named after their main camp Aquincum.	Sign unknown

== Epigraphic sources ==
While the Notitia dignitatum is the only source for the Dux Mogontiacensis, the Acincenses, Martenses, Menapii, Secundani and Vindices are also epigraphically attested by brick stamps. In addition, two troop names have been preserved on stamps whose names do not appear in the list of the Mainz Dux: the Cornacenses and a unit stamped with Portis, and whose name is dissolved with Milites Portisienses. The Legio XXII Primigenia, which is not mentioned in the Notitia, also bricked in the area of the Mainz ducat in late antiquity.

== Bibliography ==
- Scharf, Ralf (2005). Der Dux Mogontiacensis und die Notitia Dignitatum. Eine Studie zur spätantiken Grenzverteidigung [The Dux Mogontiacensis and the Notitia Dignitatum. A study of late antique border defence]. Reallexikon der Germanischen Altertumskunde. Ergänzungsbände, Volume 48 (in German). Berlin: Walter de Gruyter. ISBN 3-11-018835-X.
- Oldenstein, Jürgen (1992). Kastell Alzey. Archäologische Untersuchungen im spätrömischen Lager und Studien zur Grenzverteidigung im Mainzer Dukat (Habilitation thesis) (in German). University of Mainz. pp. 291–308.
- Notitia. "Occ I-XLI". Notitia Dignitatum [The List of Dignitaries in the Western Regions] (in German).
