= Jürgen Oldenstein =

German provincial Roman archaeologist

Jürgen Oldenstein (born 1947 in Düsseldorf ) is a German provincial Roman archaeologist.

Beginning in 1968, Oldenstein studied Provincial Roman Archeology, Pre- and Early History, and Ancient History at Goethe University Frankfurt, and 1970 to 1971 Pre-and Early History and Provincial Roman Archeology at LMU Munich. In 1974, he received his doctorate in Frankfurt with a dissertation Zur Ausrüstung römischer Auxiliareinheiten ("On the equipment of Roman auxiliary units") and then worked from 1975 to 1979 as a research assistant at the Römisch-Germanischen Kommission of the German Archaeological Institute in Frankfurt. In 1979, he became an academic assistant at the Institute for Pre- and Protohistory of the Johannes Gutenberg-Universität Mainz. In 1990, Oldenstein was a visiting fellow at Wolfson College, Oxford. In 1992, he was received his Habilitation in Mainz ("Venia legendi" for Pre- and Early History with special consideration of Roman provincial archeology). In 1998, he was appointed as an adjunct professor, and in 2002 was appointed managing director of the Institute for Pre- and Protohistory. He was involved in university government, for example as a member of the Senate and various Senate committees. From 2002 to 2010 Oldenstein was Vice President of the University of Mainz for Study and Teaching. He retired in 2012.

His research interests include the archeology of the Roman provinces, in particular Roman military history, the armament and equipment of the Roman army, late antique military buildings, Mogontiacum, and the late antique fort of Alzey. Oldenstein carried out numerous research projects, so from 1981 to 1986 and 2002 excavations in the Vicus and the late Roman fort of Alzey, from 1993 to 1996 late Roman pottery from Alzey fortress, and from 1995 to 2000 at the Belginum archaeological park in Hunsrück within the Deutsche Forschungsgemeinschaft focus on Romanization.

He is a Corresponding Member of the German Archaeological Institute.

== Selected writings ==
- "Zur Ausrüstung römischer Auxiliareinheiten. Studien zu Beschlägen und Zierat an der Ausrüstung der römischen Auxiliareinheiten des obergermanisch-raetischen Limesgebietes aus dem zweiten und dritten Jahrhundert n. Chr." In: Berichte der Römisch-Germanischen Kommission 57, 1976, pp. 49–284. (= Dissertation)
- Fundindex zu Der obergermanisch-raetische Limes des Römerreiches. Zabern, Mainz 1982, ISBN 3-8053-0549-4.
- Oldenstein, Jürgen (1992). Kastell Alzey: archäologische Untersuchungen im spätrömischen Lager und Studien zur Grenzverteidigung im Mainzer Dukat. Universität Mainz.

== Literature ==
- Jinc, Patrick et al. (Ed.): "Utere felix vivas". Festschrift for Jürgen Oldenstein. Habelt, Bonn 2012. ISBN 978-3-7749-3727-7.
