= Alzey =

- Town
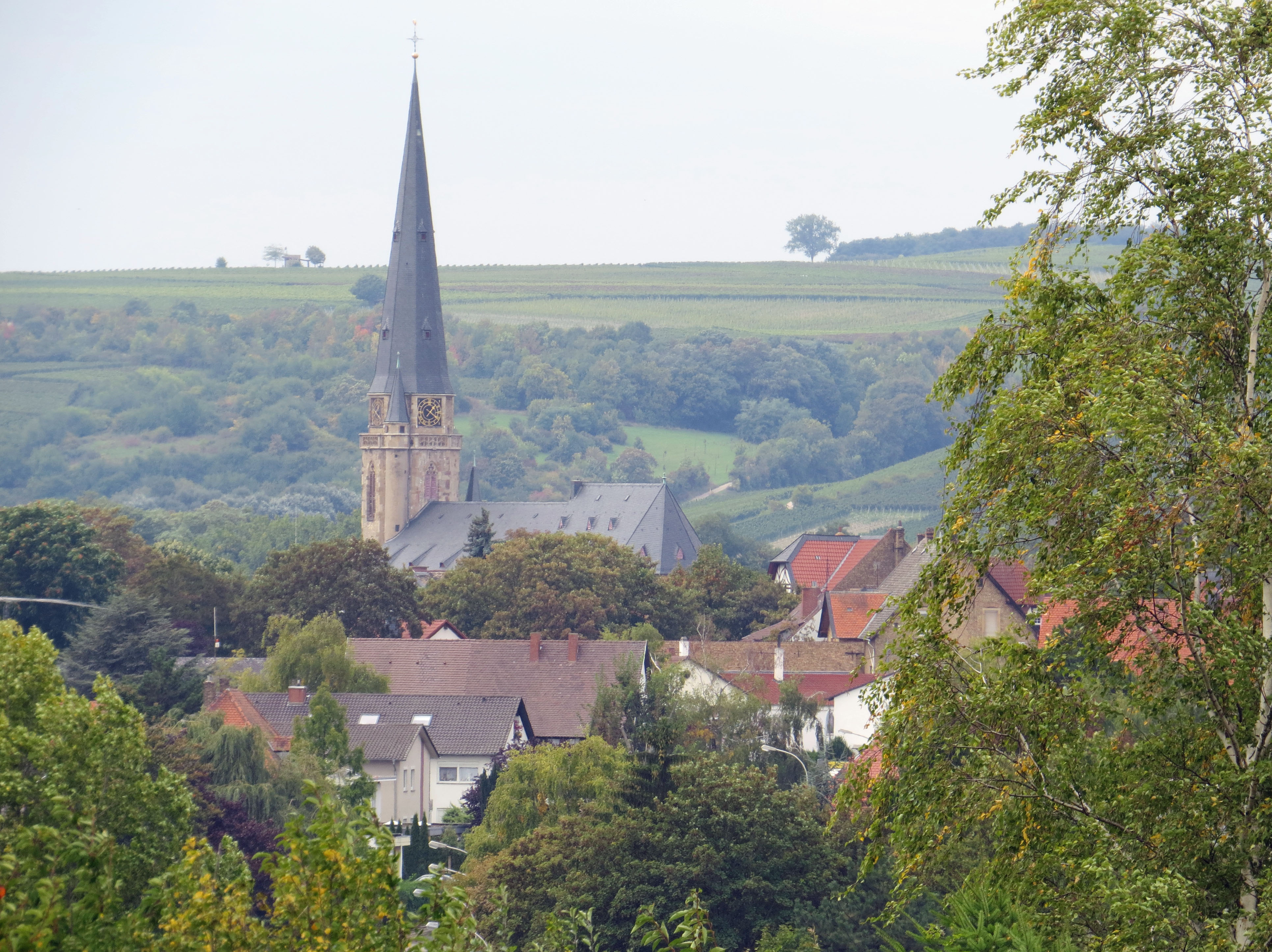
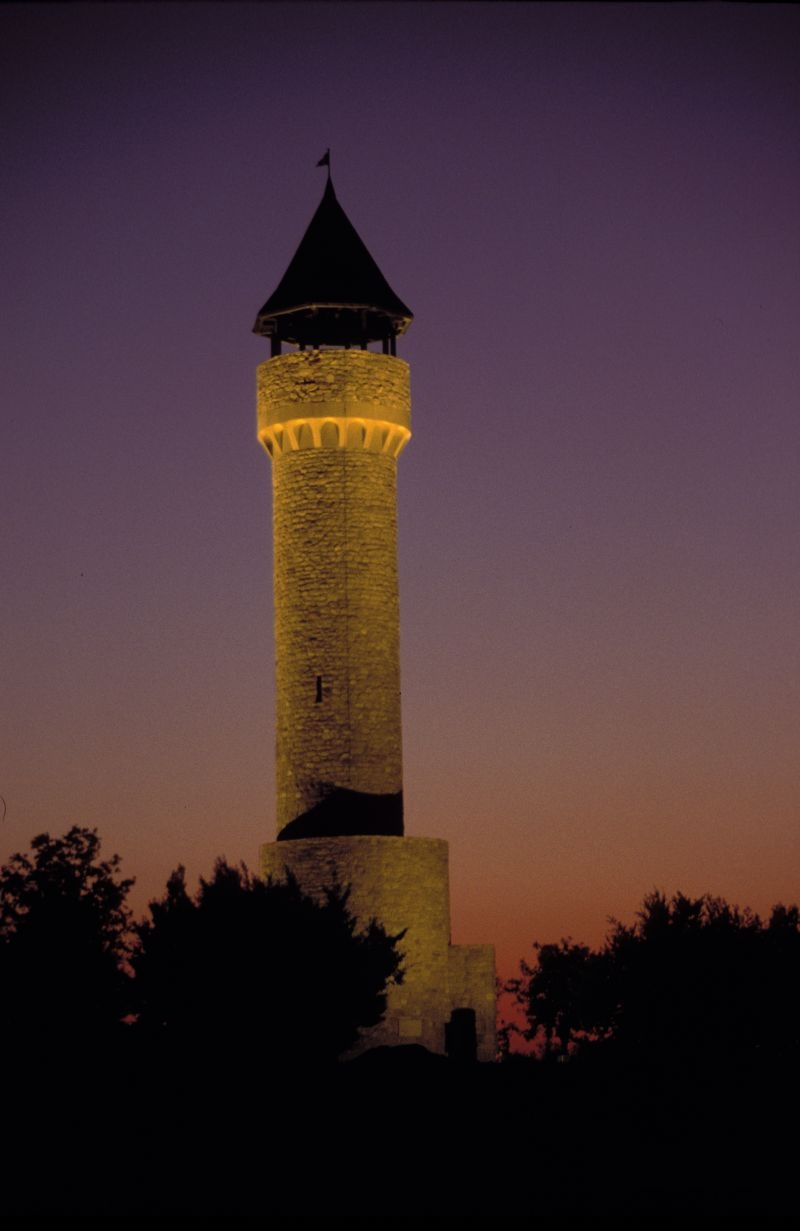
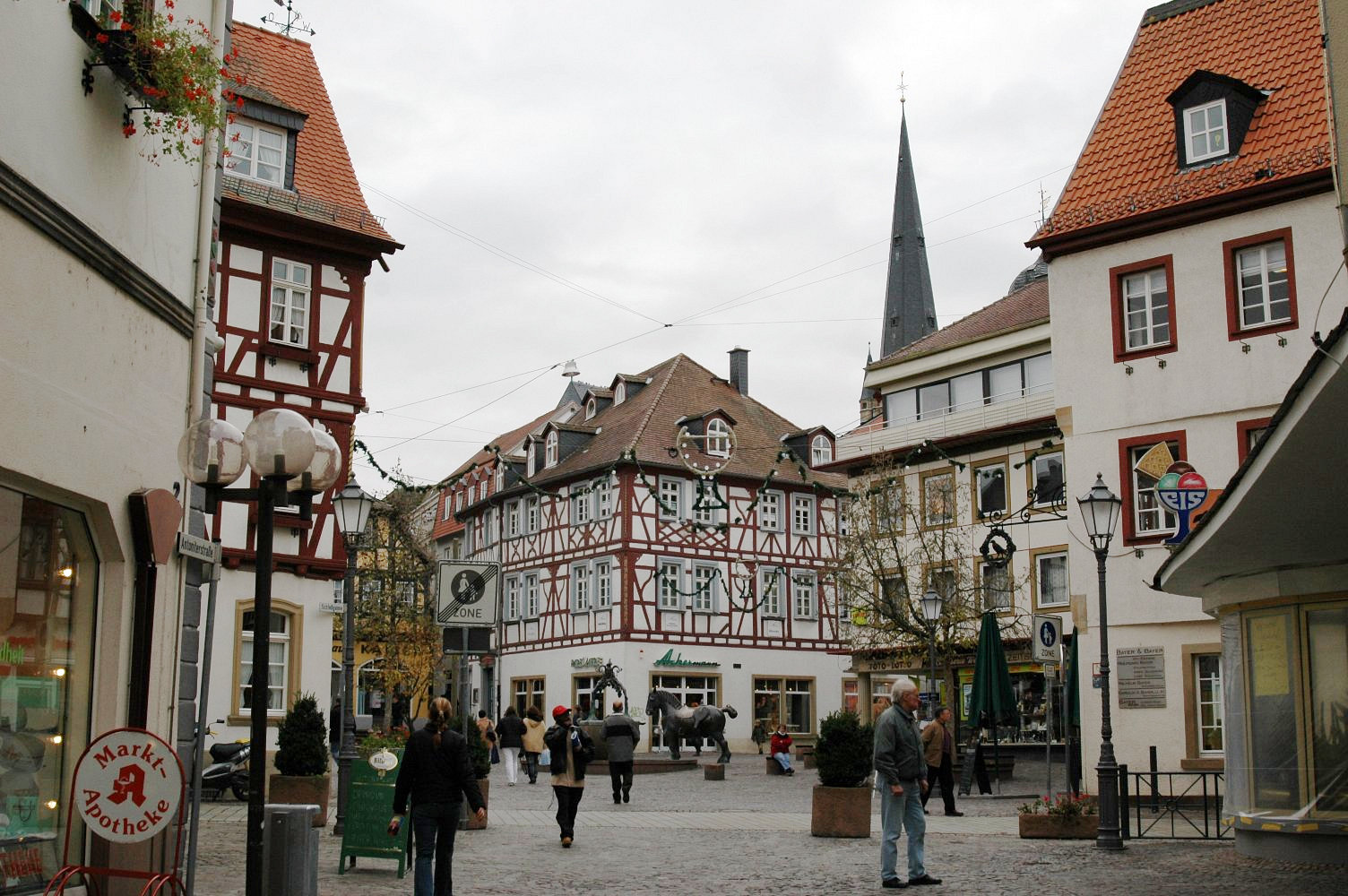
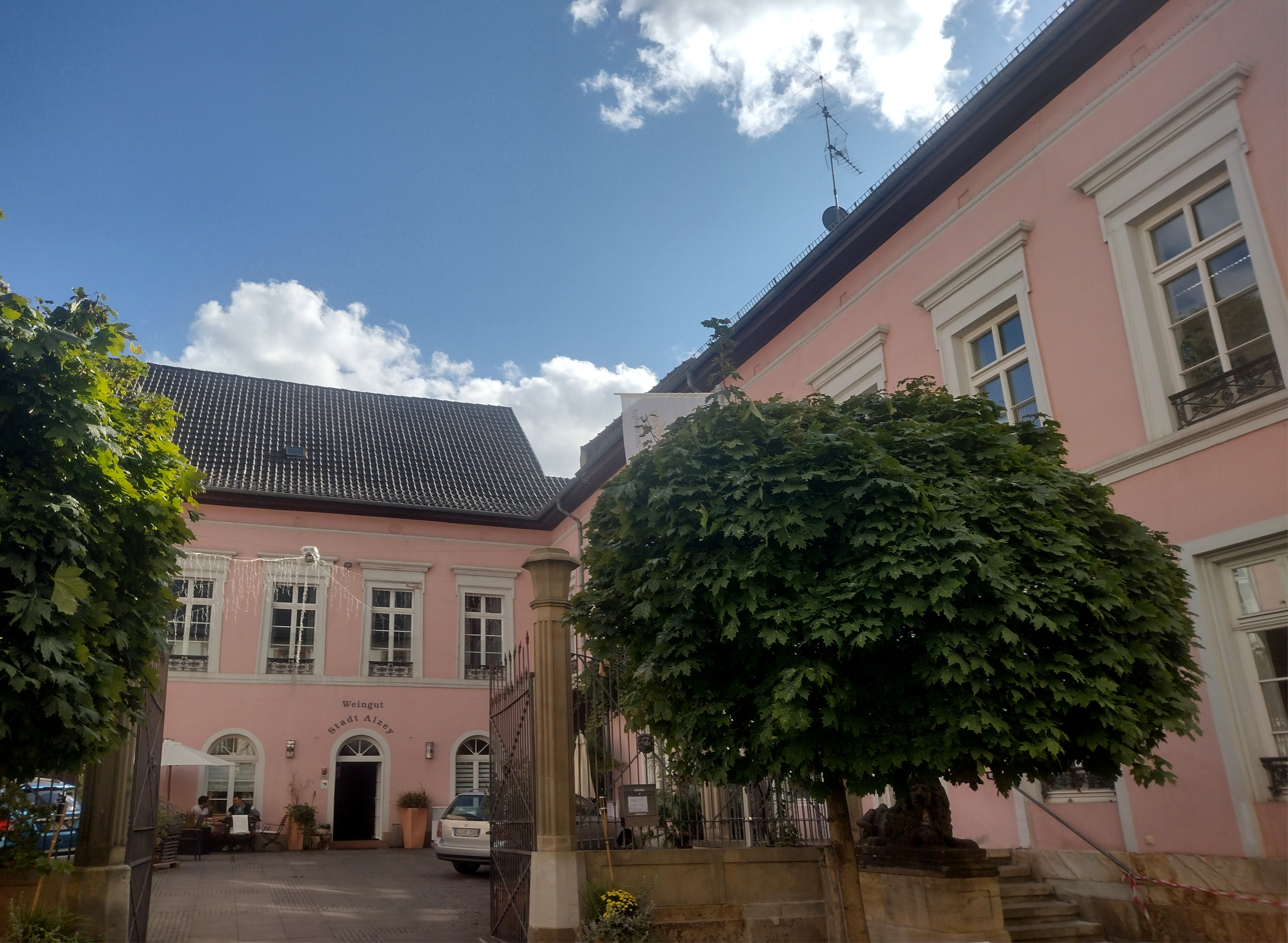
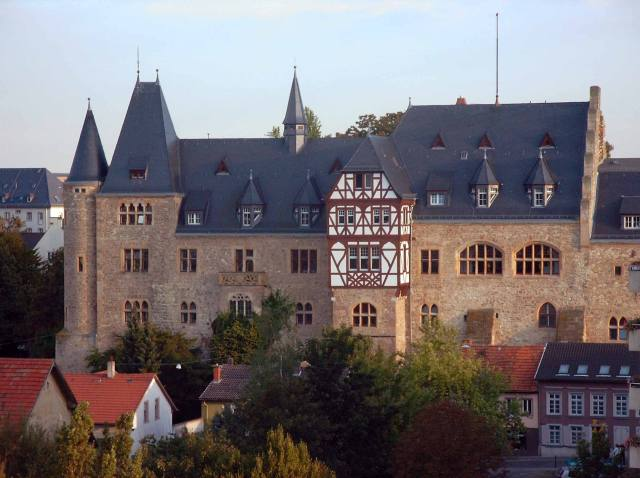
- old town and church Wartberg tower Rossmarkt square winery of the city Alzey Castle

- Coat of arms

- Location of Alzey within Alzey-Worms district
- Interactive map of Alzey
- Location within Germany Location within Rhineland-Palatinate
- Coordinates: 49°44′45″N 8°6′55″E
- Country: Germany
- State: Rhineland-Palatinate
- District: Alzey-Worms
- Subdivisions: 4

Government
  - Mayor (2022–30): Steffen Jung (SPD)

Area
  - Total: 35.22 km^{2} (13.60 sq mi)
- Elevation: 194 m (636 ft)

Population (2025-12-31)
  - Total: 19,305
  - Density: 548.1/km^{2} (1,420/sq mi)
- Time zone: UTC+01:00 (CET)
  - Summer (DST): UTC+02:00 (CEST)
- Postal codes: 55219–55232
- Dialling codes: 06731
- Vehicle registration: AZ
- Website: www.alzey.de

Alzey (German pronunciation: [ˈaltsaɪ]) is a Verband-free town – one belonging to no Verbandsgemeinde – in the Alzey-Worms district in Rhineland-Palatinate, Germany. It is the fifth-largest town in Rhenish Hesse, after Mainz, Worms, Ingelheim am Rhein and Bingen.

Alzey is one of the Nibelungenstädte – towns associated with the Nibelungenlied – because it is represented in this work by the character Volker von Alzey. Hence, Alzey is also known as Volkerstadt.

== Geography ==
=== Location ===
Alzey lies in Rhenish Hesse on the western edge of the northern part of the Upper Rhine Plain. It is surrounded by the northern part of the Alzey Hills, which meets the Rhenish Hesse Hills towards the south and the North Palatine Uplands towards the east. The town is found some 30 km southwest of Mainz and some 22 km (as the crow flies, in each case) northwest of Worms. Through Alzey, in places underground, flows the river Selz, a left-bank tributary to the Rhine.

=== Climate ===
Alzey has an oceanic climate (Köppen: Cfb; Trewartha: Dobk). Yearly precipitation in Alzey amounts to 535.3 millimetres (21.07 in), which is rather low, falling into the lowest fourth of the precipitation chart for all of Germany. At 18% of the German Weather Service's weather stations, even lower figures are recorded. The driest month is April. The most rainfall comes in July. In that month, precipitation is 1.9 times what it is in February. Precipitation varies moderately. At 41% of the weather stations, lower seasonal swings are recorded.

The Alzey weather station has recorded the following extreme values:

- Its highest temperature was 37.8 °C (100.0 °F) on 7 August 2015 and 25 July 2019.
- Its lowest temperature was −25.1 °C (−13.2 °F) on 2 February 1956.
- Its greatest annual precipitation was 733.7 mm (28.89 in) in 1965.
- Its least annual precipitation was 265.2 mm (10.44 in) in 1953.
- The longest annual sunshine was 2214 hours in 2022.
- The shortest annual sunshine was 1400 hours in 1977.

Climate data for Alzey (1991–2020 normals, extremes 1951–present)
Month	Jan	Feb	Mar	Apr	May	Jun	Jul	Aug	Sep	Oct	Nov	Dec	Year
Record high °C (°F)	15.3 (59.5)	19.6 (67.3)	24.8 (76.6)	29.2 (84.6)	32.3 (90.1)	37.8 (100.0)	38.4 (101.1)	38.4 (101.1)	33.0 (91.4)	27.1 (80.8)	23.0 (73.4)	16.7 (62.1)	38.4 (101.1)
Mean maximum °C (°F)	11.7 (53.1)	13.5 (56.3)	18.5 (65.3)	23.8 (74.8)	27.9 (82.2)	31.2 (88.2)	33.6 (92.5)	32.8 (91.0)	27.1 (80.8)	21.5 (70.7)	15.7 (60.3)	12.5 (54.5)	34.8 (94.6)
Mean daily maximum °C (°F)	4.3 (39.7)	6.2 (43.2)	10.8 (51.4)	15.7 (60.3)	19.6 (67.3)	23.1 (73.6)	25.7 (78.3)	25.3 (77.5)	20.3 (68.5)	14.4 (57.9)	8.5 (47.3)	5.1 (41.2)	14.9 (58.8)
Daily mean °C (°F)	1.8 (35.2)	2.8 (37.0)	6.2 (43.2)	10.4 (50.7)	14.3 (57.7)	17.5 (63.5)	19.6 (67.3)	19.2 (66.6)	14.9 (58.8)	10.1 (50.2)	5.7 (42.3)	2.7 (36.9)	10.5 (50.9)
Mean daily minimum °C (°F)	−0.8 (30.6)	−0.4 (31.3)	2.1 (35.8)	5.1 (41.2)	8.8 (47.8)	11.9 (53.4)	13.8 (56.8)	13.6 (56.5)	10.0 (50.0)	6.4 (43.5)	2.8 (37.0)	0.2 (32.4)	6.1 (43.0)
Mean minimum °C (°F)	−9.0 (15.8)	−7.0 (19.4)	−3.7 (25.3)	−1.4 (29.5)	2.6 (36.7)	6.7 (44.1)	8.8 (47.8)	8.4 (47.1)	4.6 (40.3)	−0.5 (31.1)	−3.4 (25.9)	−7.4 (18.7)	−11.3 (11.7)
Record low °C (°F)	−21.4 (−6.5)	−25.1 (−13.2)	−14.2 (6.4)	−6.1 (21.0)	−1.7 (28.9)	1.0 (33.8)	3.5 (38.3)	3.5 (38.3)	−1.4 (29.5)	−5.9 (21.4)	−12.4 (9.7)	−19.4 (−2.9)	−25.1 (−13.2)
Average precipitation mm (inches)	35.0 (1.38)	34.6 (1.36)	36.9 (1.45)	31.5 (1.24)	54.3 (2.14)	49.7 (1.96)	60.1 (2.37)	53.0 (2.09)	44.8 (1.76)	44.4 (1.75)	41.6 (1.64)	49.4 (1.94)	535.3 (21.07)
Average extreme snow depth cm (inches)	4.3 (1.7)	3.5 (1.4)	2.8 (1.1)	0 (0)	0 (0)	0 (0)	0 (0)	0 (0)	0 (0)	trace	0.9 (0.4)	4.3 (1.7)	9.0 (3.5)
Average precipitation days (≥ 0.1 mm)	13.6	12.3	13.1	11.1	12.6	11.5	13.1	11.8	10.8	13.0	14.5	15.1	152.5
Average relative humidity (%)	85.3	80.9	74.0	66.8	69.0	69.2	66.6	68.3	75.0	83.3	87.3	87.3	76.1
Mean monthly sunshine hours	46.5	78.5	139.5	196.6	220.2	227.3	238.3	229.9	166.9	96.5	48.2	38.8	1,727.4
Source: Deutscher Wetterdienst / SKlima.de

== History ==
=== From the Neolithic to the early first millennium ===
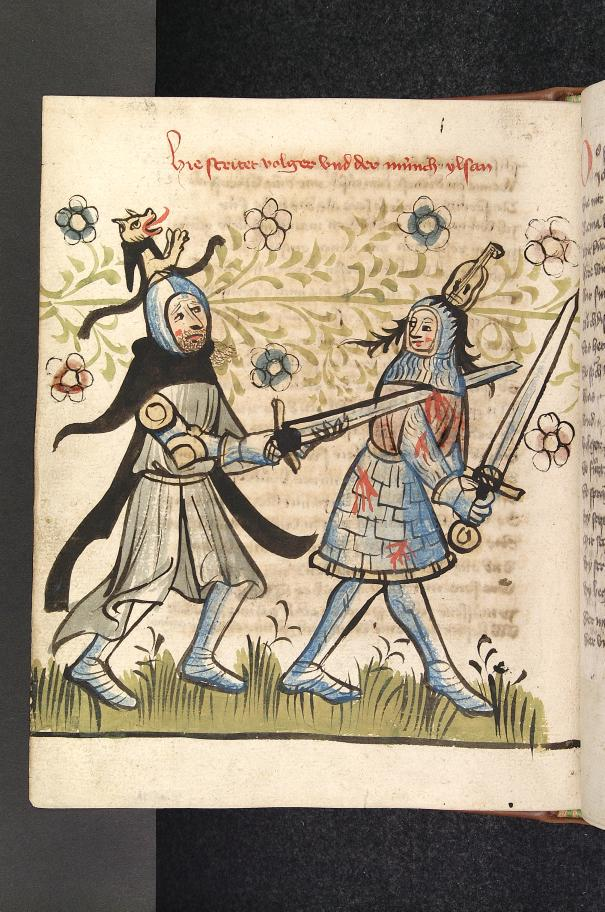
Volker von Alzey (right) from Legends about Theodoric the Great

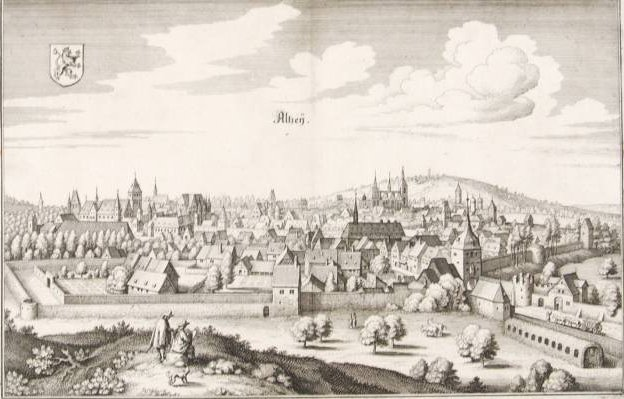
Copper etching by Matthäus Merian 1645

The earliest traces of settlement in the Alzey area go back as far as the Neolithic. Alzey was founded as a vicus (village) in the Roman province of Germania Superior in the lands surrounding Mogontiacum (Mainz).

The name of Alzey is first mentioned on a Nymphenstein (a Roman altar stone dedicated to nymphs), dedicated on 22 November 223 by the Vicani Altiaienses ("Villagers of Alzey"). The name Altiaia could well originate from the name of an older, pre-Roman Celtic settlement of about 400 BC, although the name's exact origins have not been passed down to the present day. Over the ruins of the Roman village, which was destroyed about 350, a fort, Castra Alteium, was built about 390. In 406 and 407, the Burgundians, together with the Vandals, crossed the Rhine and settled in Mainz, Alzey and Worms as Roman confederates. The area was secured for them by treaty. In 436, the Burgundian kingdom was destroyed by the Western Roman magister militum Flavius Aëtius with help from Hunnish troops. These events were worked into the Nibelungenlied and form the origin of the legendary figure Volker von Alzey, the gleeman in the Nibelungenlied. After 450, Alzey passed to the Alamanni and the Franks when they took over the land. After Clovis I's death in 511, the Frankish Empire fell apart into separate smaller kingdoms, and Alzey became part of Austrasia, whose capital was at Metz. Following the unification of the Frankish kingdoms in the mid-8th century, Alzey was assigned by the 843 Treaty of Verdun to the Kingdom of the East Franks, a forerunner of the German Empire. In 897, Alzey was first mentioned as an Imperial fief.

=== 12th century to early 20th century ===
In 1156, Alzey belonged to the Electorate of the Palatinate, and Konrad von Staufen attained the rank of Count Palatine in the Imperial castle, which had been completed in 1118. In 1277, Alzey attained the rank of town from Rudolf von Habsburg. In 1620, Count Ambrogio Spinola sided with the Catholic Emperor in the Thirty Years' War against the Protestant Electorate of the Palatinate and also conquered Alzey. In 1689, the town and the castle, under the French troops' scorched-earth policy, were burnt down in the Nine Years' War, when Louis XIV's armies had to leave areas conquered earlier. In 1798, areas west of the Rhine, among them those that until this time had been parts of the Electorate of the Palatinate, were annexed to France. Alzey belonged until 1814 to the Department of Mont-Tonnerre (or Donnersberg in German). In 1816, Alzey was attached to the Grand Duchy of Hesse. In 1909, the winemaking school (now the Landesanstalt für Rebenzüchtung) was founded. Its first head was Georg Scheu, after whom the grape variety Scheurebe is named.

=== Third Reich ===
On Kristallnacht (9 November 1938), the Alzey synagogue was destroyed and the fittings were burnt in front of the building. The ruin was removed in the 1950s. A rescued Torah scroll can nowadays be found in the museum. On 8 January 1945, in World War II, the town narrowly missed being destroyed when 36 Boeing B-17 bombers had been sent to take out a railway bridge in Alzey. Owing to bad weather and a landmark misinterpretation – the crew mistook the top of the old watchtower for the church steeple – the bombers ended up dropping their load on the Wartberg, a nearby hill, giving rise to the legend of the Wartbergturm – the old tower – as Alzey's saviour.

=== Since 1945 ===
Since 1947, Alzey has no longer been Hessian, but rather it became the seat of Alzey District in the newly formed state of Rhineland-Palatinate.

Since the merger of the old Alzey and Worms Districts in 1969, Alzey has been the seat of the new Alzey-Worms District and the seat of the Verbandsgemeinde of Alzey-Land, although as a Verband-free town, it does not actually belong to the Verbandsgemeinde.

=== Amalgamations ===
On 22 April 1972, the formerly autonomous villages of Weinheim, Heimersheim and Dautenheim were amalgamated with Alzey. The outlying centre of Schafhausen had already been a Stadtteil (constituent community) of Alzey since the Middle Ages.

=== Religion ===
On 31 January 2008, the townsfolk's religious affiliations broke down thus:

- 8,927 Evangelical
- 3,684 Catholic
- 2,996 none or no affiliation established in public law
- 1,322 other affiliations established in public law
- 6,809 other
- 988 no data
- sundry
- 50 Alzey Free Religious-Humanist Association
- 4 Old Catholic
- 2 Jewish
- 1 Mainz Free Religious-Humanist Association

==== Jewish History ====
The town's Jewish congregation is dated to the 14th century. In 1349, during the Black Death, the town's Jews were murdered in the cause of a blood libel. A few years after, the community renewed and a document from 1377 depicted a Jew named Yitschak of Alzey who sued the town of Worms for not paying its debt to him. In 1389, a "Jew Alley" is first mentioned, depicting a kind of Ghetto with a gate, which closes at night.

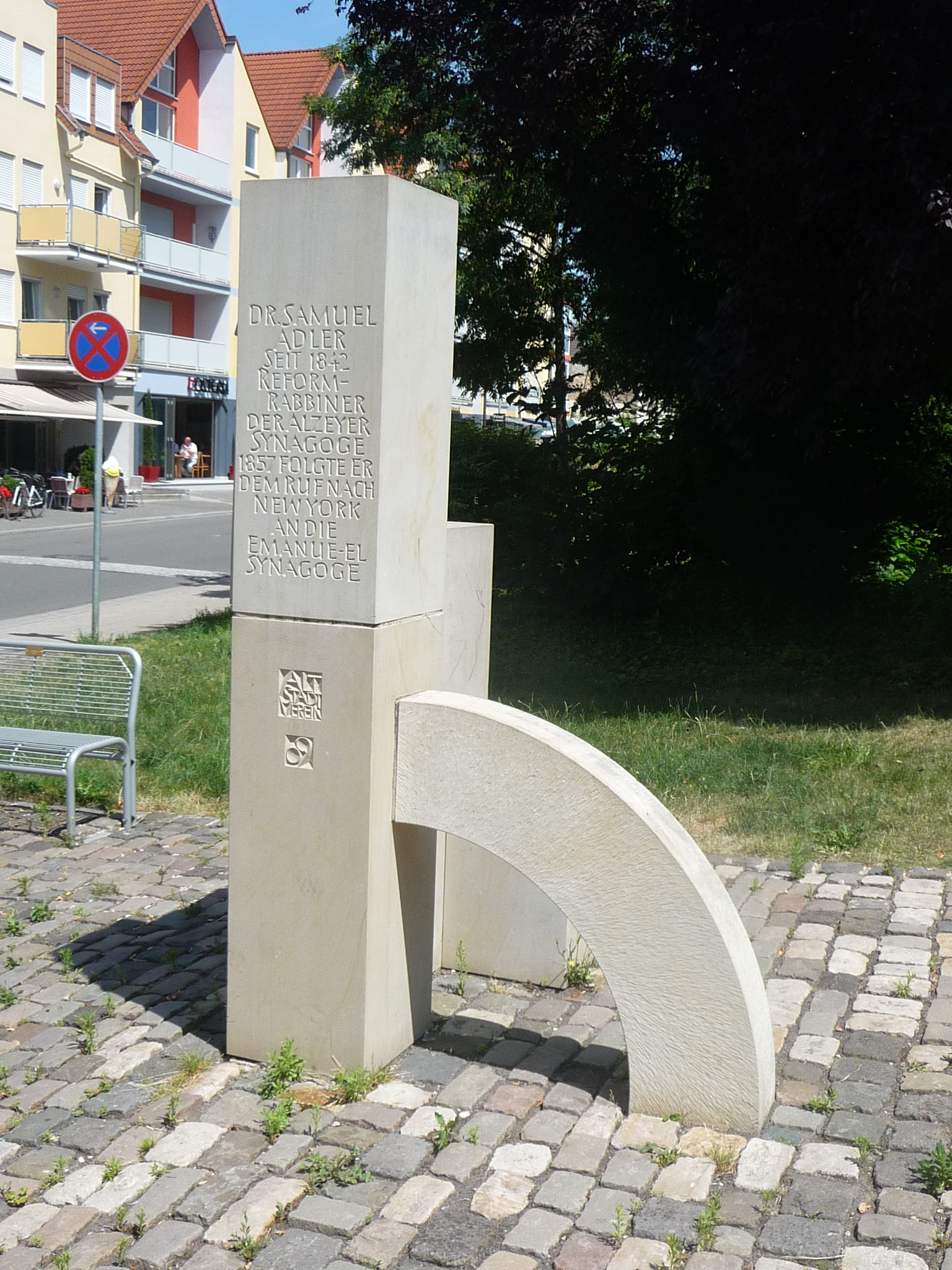
Synagoge-Alzey

Jews appeared once again in town only by the 17th century, and the first synagogue was built only by 1791. Several documents from around 1670, depict disputes between Joseph Simon Jessel, a Jew who lived in Alzey and the town butchers, regarding his wish to open a business. On another dispute between him and a neighbor who sold his house to Jessel but refused to evacuate, the verdict blamed both sides — Jessel for it was "unthinkable that a Jew will hit a Christian", and the neighbor for not evacuating the house. Nevertheless, the Count of Palatine Zweibrücken protected the Jews, whose high taxes were a dominant factor of his income. In 1789, there were 21 Jewish households in town. During the 18th century, most of the town Jews were established if not rich. in 1710, a Jew called Simcha Deidesheimer founded a large Matzo factory that existed until 1925 and exported its products to France and Italy. In addition, two brothers named Levy opened a porcelain factory in town in 1770. The community had a local cemetery Alzey was the hometown of well-known family Belmont; In 1844, Jewish Shimon Belmont (the ancestor of American politicians August Belmont and August Belmont JR. was elected as the president of the 'Narhalle' carnival, which he initiated, intended for the town's high classes. He donated some money to the cemetery and other community facilities. Eight of Alzey Jews died as soldiers during World War I. According to town municipality, 76 Jews were expelled from the town to Nazi concentration camps around Europe. In 1954, one Jew returned to Alzey.

== Politics ==
=== Town council ===
The council is made up of 36 part-time council members (the number increased from 32 in 2024 because of population increases), who are elected at the municipal elections held every five years, and the full-time mayor as chairman. The seats are allocated as follows:

Year	SPD	CDU	FDP	Greens	LINKE	FWG	Total
2024	13	8	3	1	2	9	36 seats
2019	10	8	4	1	2	7	32 seats
2014	10	10	2	1	2	7	32 seats
2009	11	9	2	2	1	7	32 seats
2004	12	11	1	2	-	6	32 seats

=== Mayors ===
- (1982–1990) Walter Zuber (SPD)
- (1990–2006) Knut Benkert (SPD)
- (2006–2022) Christoph Burkhard (independent CDU candidate)
- (2022–) Steffen Jung (SPD)

=== Coat of arms ===
The town's arms has the following description: Divided horizontally black and silver; above, a golden lion issuant from the line of division, crowned red and armed red, facing dexter; below, a red vielle set in sinister bend.

The lion recalls the town's former affiliation with the Electorate of the Palatinate. The vielle, a medieval fiddle, reminds of Volker von Alzey. The vielle also formed part of the coat of arms of medieval noble families resident in Alzey.

The coat of arms in its present form has been introduced in 1926. Earlier versions only featured the lion but not the vielle.

=== Town partnerships ===
- Harpenden, Hertfordshire, England, United Kingdom since 1963
- Josselin, Morbihan, France since 1973
- Lembeye, Pyrénées-Atlantiques, France, with the outlying centre of Weinheim, since 1980
- Rechnitz, Burgenland, Austria since 1981
- Kościan, Greater Poland Voivodeship, Poland since 1990
- (Germany) Kamenz, Saxony since 1990

== Culture and sightseeing ==
=== Awards and prizes ===
The town of Alzey regularly bestows the following awards and prizes:

- Elisabeth-Langgässer-Literaturpreis (since 1988 every three years)
- Georg-Scheu-Plakette (yearly at the winemakers' festival)

=== Music ===
The town's links with wine are even shown in the Alser Lied, a town song, which is always sung on the Friday of the opening of the winemakers' festival. One version sung by former mayor Walter Zuber could be found on the jukebox at the Alzey traditional pub, Zur Gretel for a decade.

=== Theatre ===
- Gerry-Jansen-Theater

=== Museums ===
- Geschichtsmuseum der Stadt Alzey (Town of Alzey History Museum)

=== Buildings ===
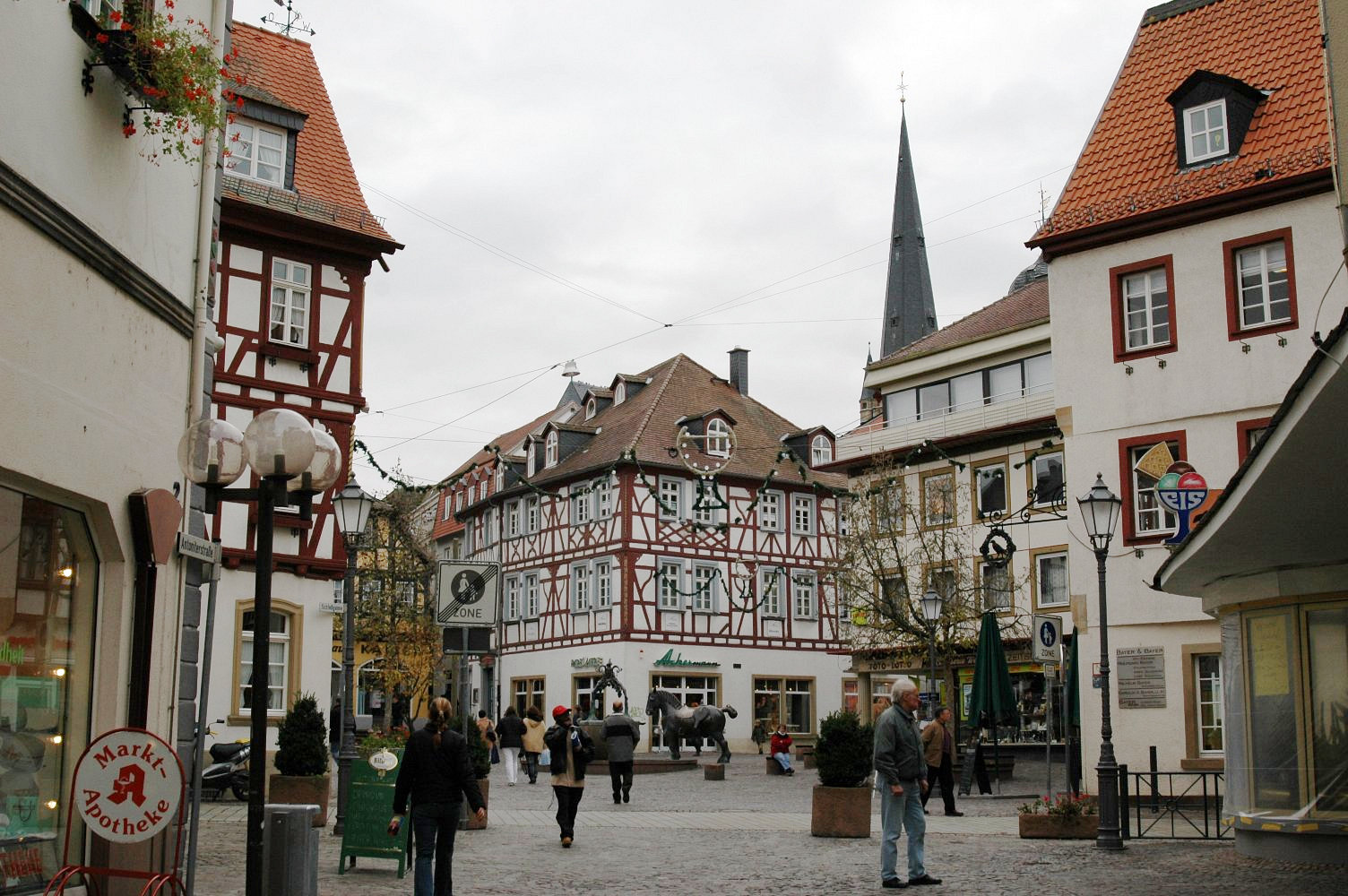
Alzey Rossmarkt (Horse Market)

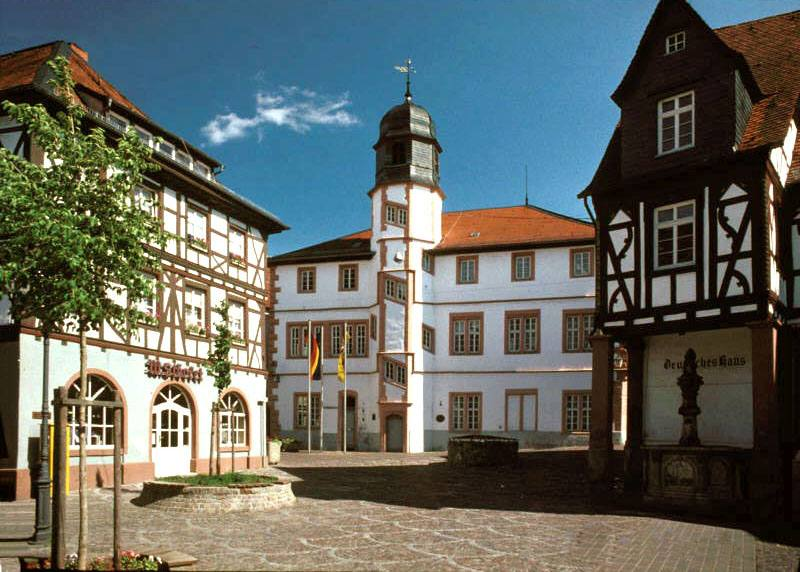
Alzeyer Fischmarkt (Fish Market)

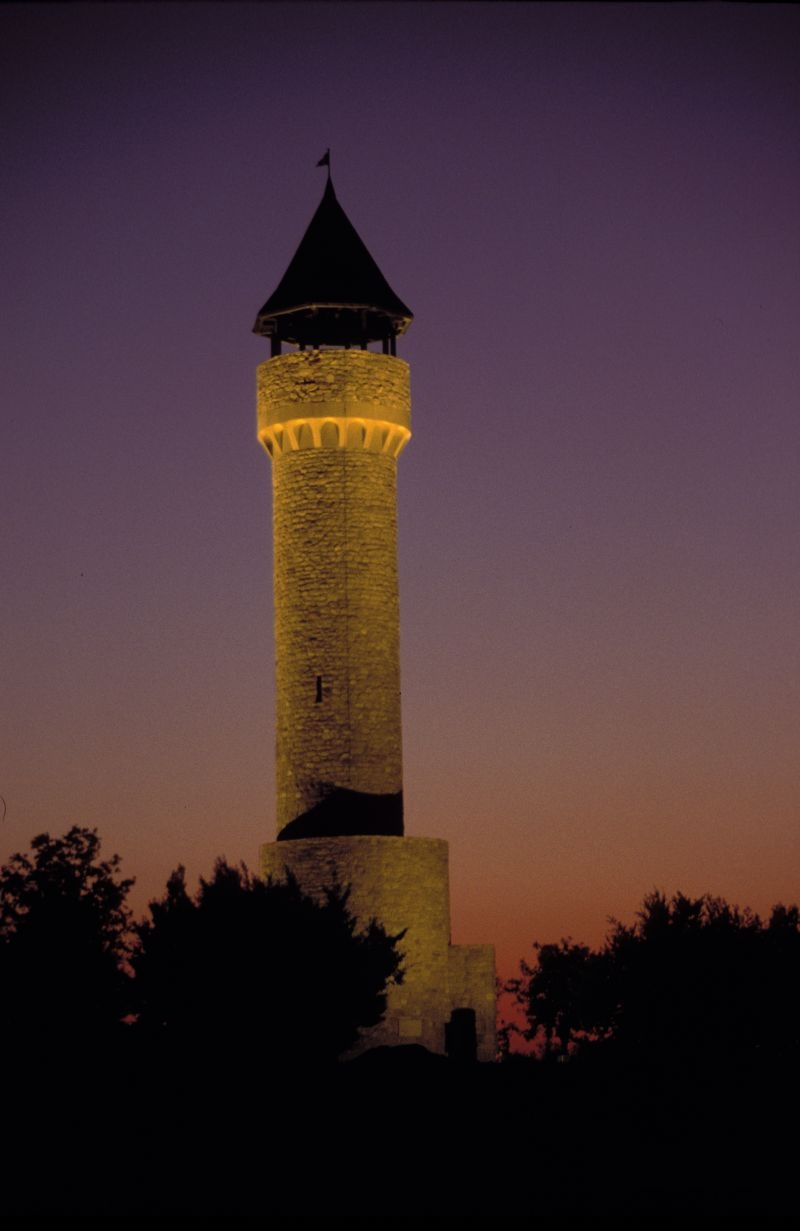
Wartbergturm

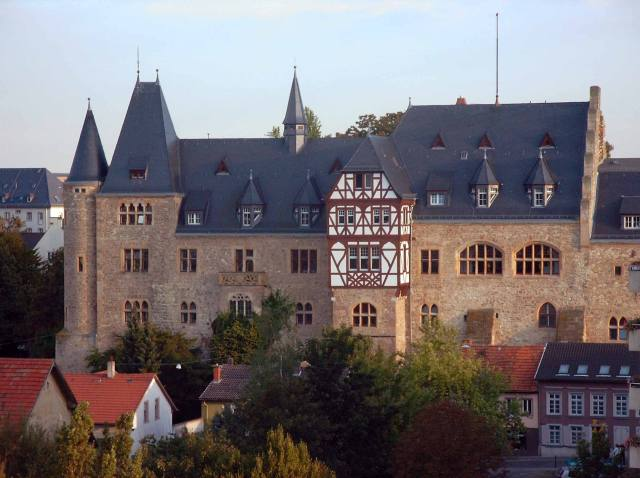
Alzeyer Schloss (castle)

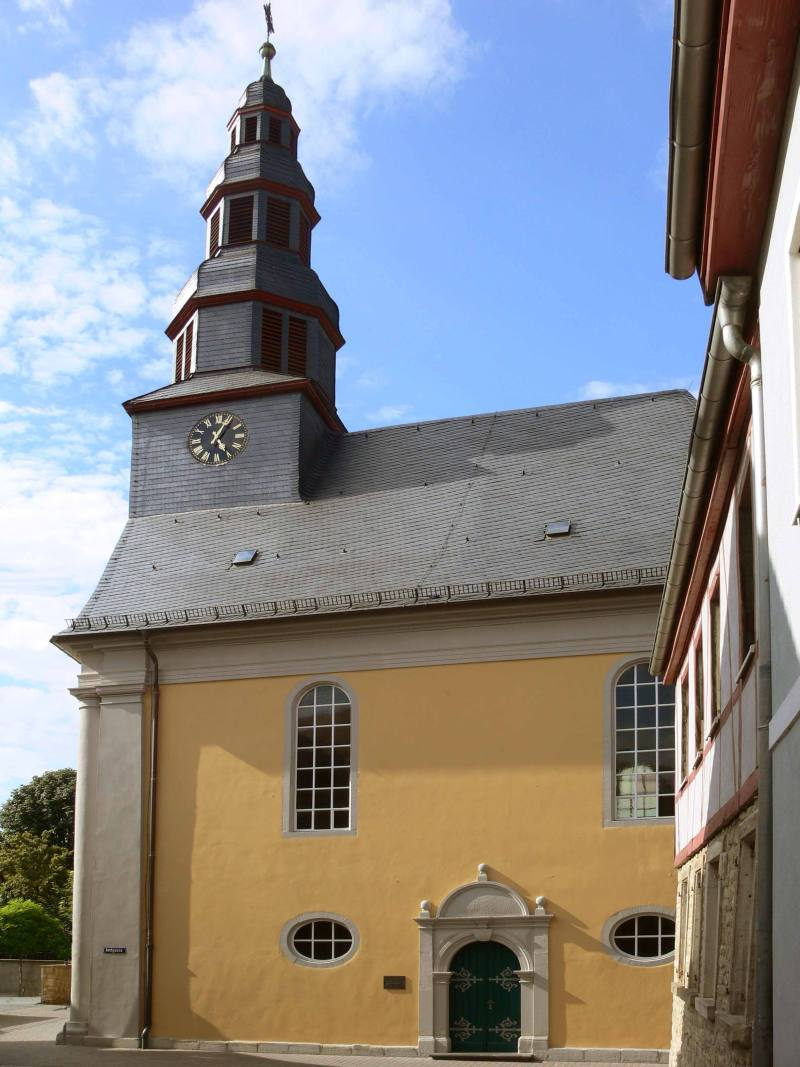
Kleine Kirche ("Little Church")

==== The Old Town ====
Alzey has a well-kept old town with many timber-frame houses, restaurants, cafés and shops, surrounded by ruins of the mediaeval town wall. The town's midpoint is the Rossmarkt ("Horse Market") with the bronze horse by artist Gernot Rumpf. A sculpture of an ondine by Karlheinz Oswald stands at the Fischmarkt ("Fish Market") in front of the old town hall.

=== Sport ===
The Wartbergstadion is the town's biggest sporting facility. It has a type-B competition running track with a large grass playing field, a 400 m loop track, track and field areas (plastic) and stands. Here can also be found the leisure swimming pool Wartbergbad. Nearby there is a riding club with stalls, paddocks and a riding hall, and a tennis club with seven clay courts.

Moreover, Alzey has at its disposal a newly built artificial-turf playing field, which is used mainly by the hockey and football clubs and an American Football club. There is also a multipurpose sporting ground and at schools several more hard courts.

=== Regular events ===
==== Weinbergshäuschen Wanderung ====
The so-called Weinbergshäuschen Wanderung ("Vineyard Cottage Hike"), or Wingertshaisje Wanderung in the local speech, is a hike through the hilly Rhenish-Hessian countryside between Alzey and the outlying centres of Weinheim and Heimersheim. It is held each September on the first Sunday in that month. Along the network of paths, vineyard cottages are operated between 11:00 and 18:00 by winemaking estates and clubs. On offer at these times are both cold and warm foods and drinks, including the Rhenish-Hessian wine typical of the region.

==== Winemakers' festival ====
The Winzerfest is held each year on the third weekend in September and lasts from Friday to the following Tuesday. It is the biggest event of its kind in Alzey. On the wine and sekt terrace are presented selected regional wines. Parallel with this is a yearly market with rides and games of all kinds.

=== Culinary specialities ===
Being the centre of a winegrowing region, the specialities are first and foremost wines and dishes that are made with wine, such as the Backesgrumbeere, a seasoned potato casserole with bacon, wine and sour cream, which is found throughout Rhenish Hesse. The winegrowing engineer Georg Scheu named a variety of grapevine after his workplace, the Perle von Alzey.

== Economy and infrastructure ==
=== Agriculture ===
Alzey is characterized by winegrowing and with 769 ha of vineyards currently worked, 69% with white wine varieties and 31% with red, it ranks sixth in size among winegrowing centres in Rhineland-Palatinate, and after Worms (1 490 ha) and Nierstein (783 ha), it is the third biggest winegrowing centre in Rhenish Hesse.

=== Transport ===
Alzey is found near the Autobahnkreuz Alzey, an Autobahn interchange at which the two Autobahnen A 61 (Venlo, Koblenz, Bingen, Alzey, Ludwigshafen, Hockenheim) and A 63 (Mainz, Alzey, Kaiserslautern) cross.

Alzey station has direct connections to Mainz Central Station by Regional-Express and Regionalbahn services on the Alzey–Mainz railway, and on the Rheinhessenbahn (railway) to Bingen and Worms. The Donnersbergbahn has connected Alzey with Kirchheimbolanden again since 1999. On weekends and holidays, trips on the Elsass-Express ("Alsace Express") to Wissembourg are possible.

The town belongs to the VRN. This tariff can also be used for trips to and from the Rhein-Nahe-Nahverkehrsverbund (RNN) area as far as Alzey.

=== Public institutions ===
- Kreiskrankenhaus Alzey (general hospital)
- Rheinhessen-Fachklinik Alzey (specialised hospital for psychiatry and neurology)
- Seat of Alzey-Worms district council
- Seat of the Verbandsgemeinde of Alzey-Land
- Seat of the branch office of the Bingen-Alzey tax office

=== Education ===
- Primary schools:
  - Albert-Schweitzer-Schule
  - Nibelungenschule
  - St. Marienschule
- Secondary school:
  - Gustav-Heinemann-Schulzentrum with:
    - Hauptschule
    - Realschule
  - Elisabeth Langgässer Gymnasium
  - Gymnasium am Römerkastell
  - Staatliches Aufbaugymnasium (state secondary school)
- Other:
  - two special schools (Volkerschule and Löwenschule)
  - District music school
  - Berufsbildende Schule Alzey (vocational school)
  - Rheinhessen Fachklinik nursing school

== Famous people ==
=== Honorary citizens ===
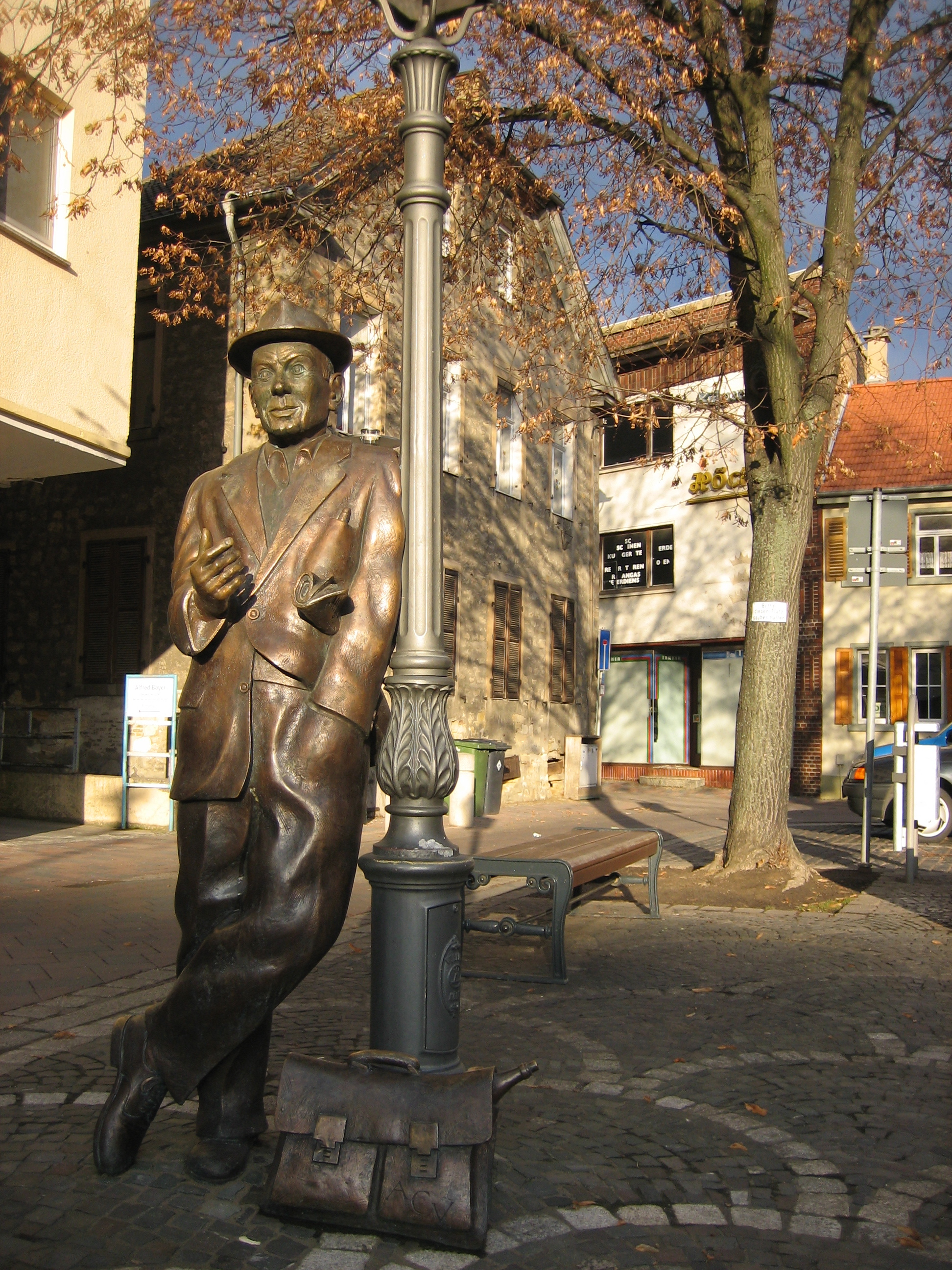
Schnatz vum Kroneplatz

- Georg Scheu
- Willi Bechtolsheimer
- Kurt Neumann
- Walter Zuber
- Karl-Heinz Kipp

=== Sons and daughters of the town ===
- Felix Adler (1851–1933), philosopher and son of Rabbi Samuel Adler
- August Belmont (1816–1890), German-American banker and politician. He was from the well known Jewish family Belmont in Alzey as a son of Simon Isaac, who had taken the name Belmont under Napoleon's name law.
- Gisela Biedermann (born 1948), Liechtensteiner physician and politician
- Heinrich Claß (1868–1953) was from 1908 to 1939 chairman of the Alldeutscher Verband, the influential nationalistic club in Imperial Germany. Claß was known for, among other things, works published under the pseudonyms Daniel Frymann and Einhart, in which he propagated his extreme nationalistic and expansionist politics.
- Karl-Heinz Kipp (1924–2017), entrepreneur, founder of the Massa-Märkte (now belonging to the Metro Group), ranked 154 on Forbes's list of wealthiest people (2008) with an estimated fortune of US$6,300,000,000.
- Elisabeth Langgässer (1899–1950), writer
- Gunther Metz (born 1967), former professional footballer, active in 1 FC Kaiserslautern and Karlsruher SC in the 1990s, today co-trainer of the Lauterer Amateure.
- Tarkan Tevetoğlu, (born 1972), Turkish pop musician with more than 15 million CDs sold. In Germany he is particularly well known for the title "Şımarık".
- Daniela Schmitt (born 1972), politician (FDP)

=== Famous people associated with the town ===
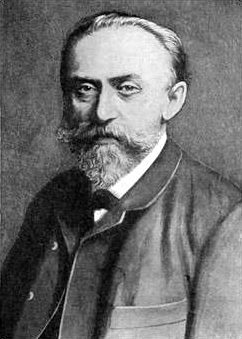
Ludwig Bamberger

- Dr. Samuel Adler (1809–1891) was from 1842 to 1857 Rabbi of Alzey's Jewish community. He was a supporter of the liberal movement in German Jewry and advocated, for example, the use of German in Jewish worship and a greater role for women. Dr. Adler went as a rabbi to the Temple Emanu-El in New York and became head of the USA's leading Jewish Reform community. Services held by Samuel Adler continued to be in his preferred German. His library is as far as has been possible maintained at Hebrew Union College in Cincinnati.
- Ludwig Bamberger (1823–1899), was a revolutionary, banker and politician. He belonged to the Democrats, who faced down Prussian troops at the Schlosspark in Kirchheimbolanden in 1848. Sentenced to death in absentia, Bamberger later became a banker (founding member of Deutsche Bank) and one of the leading liberal politicians after the German Empire was founded in 1871. He is described as the "Father" of the German Mark (founding of an independent issuing bank). He was for many years a Member of the Reichstag for the electoral district of Bingen-Alzey (from 1871 to 1893) and married Anna Belmont from Alzey.
