= Volker von Alzey =

Legendary Figure

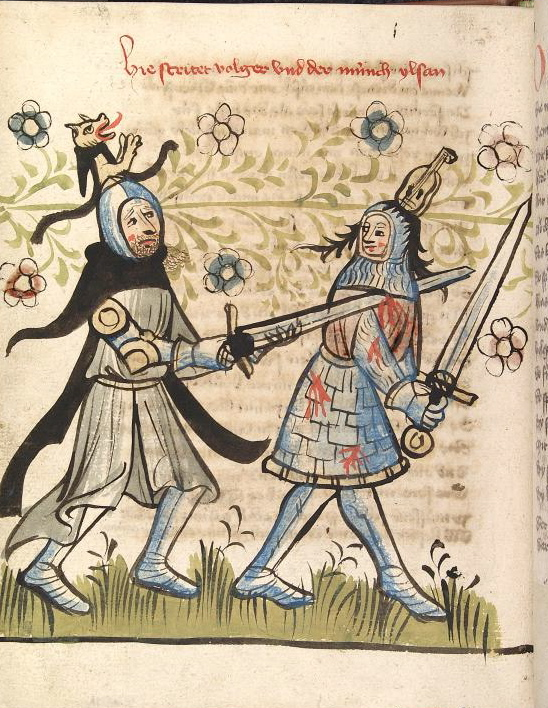
Volker von Alzey (right) in combat against the Bernese monk Islan. Illustration from the Rosengarten zu Worms

Volker von Alzey is a legendary figure from the Nibelungenlied. He is the minstrel at the court of Burgundy in Worms. His headquarters Alzey is located about 20 kilometres (12 mi) from Worms. Volker is one of the Burgundian knights and heroes. He dies at Hildebrand's hand with the other Burgundians fighting alongside Hagen at King Etzel's castle.

== Excerpt from the Nibelungenlied ==
=== Original ===
„Die drie künege wâren, als ich gesaget hân,
von vil hôhem ellen: in wâren undertân
ouch die besten recken, von de man hât gesaget,
starc und vil küene, in scharpfen strîten unverzaget.

Daz was von Tronege Hagene und ouch der bruoder sîn,
Dancwart der vil snelle, von Metzen Ortwîn,
der zwene marcgrâven Gêre und Ekkewart,
Volkêr von Alzeije, mit ganzem ellen wol bewart.

=== English translation ===
In truth were these three rulers, / as I before did say,
Great and high in power, / and homage true had they
Eke of knights the boldest / and best that e'er were known,
Keen men all and valiant, / as they in battle oft had shown.

There was of Tronje Hagen, / and of that princely line
His brother valiant Dankwart; / and eke of Metz Ortwein;
Then further the two margraves, / Gere and Eckewart;
Of Alzei was Volker, / a doughty man of dauntless heart.

== Volker's "fiddle" ==
Volker was noted as "a minstrel and player of the fidla, a medieval stringed instrument among the predecessors of the violin." This instrument, also spelled "Fiðla" is usually translated as "fiddle".

=== Volker's fiddle in coats of arms ===
Coat of arms of Alzey

Coat of arms of the Alzey-Worms district, showing the Nibelung Dragon above Volker's fidla

== Volker in popular culture ==
- Volker von Alzey, played by Hans von Borsody, is the narrator in the 1966 film version of the Nibelung Saga.
- Walter Plathe played Volker singing in the 2008 at the Nibelung Festival, Worms.
