= Comes tractus Argentoratensis =

Roman military title in late antiquity

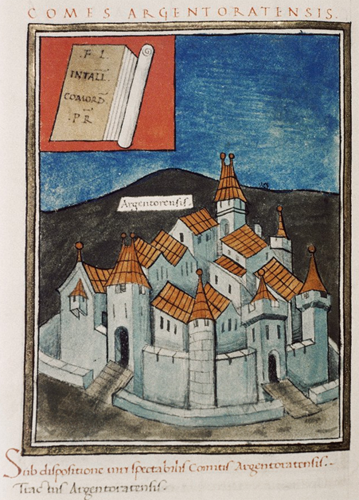
Illustration from the Notitia Dignitatum depicting the fortress of Strasbourg representing the comes tractus Argentoratensis

The comes tractus Argentoratensis (literally: "count of Strasbourg region") was in late antiquity commander of units of the mobile field army of the Western Roman Empire, operating along the Rhine frontier (Danube–Iller–Rhine Limes) in the Diocese of Gaul.

== Definition ==
The title Comes was usually awarded to members of the highest rank of the nobility (vir spectabilis), or to the closest confidants of the Emperor. In the late Roman army, it was then transferred to the commanders of mobile field armies (comitatenses) or to officers who were entrusted with temporary special commands (Comes rei militaris) . His direct superior was the magister peditum praesentalis of the West, the supreme commander of the infantry troops. His area of responsibility (Tractus) mainly included the region around the Legion camp Argentoratum (in the present day Strasbourg and Alsace), in the province of Germania Prima.

According to one source, the position was created around 408, following the barbarian occupation of most of Gaul, and lasted until Gaul was recovered in 416.
