= Danube–Iller–Rhine Limes =

Roman Defensive Fortifications

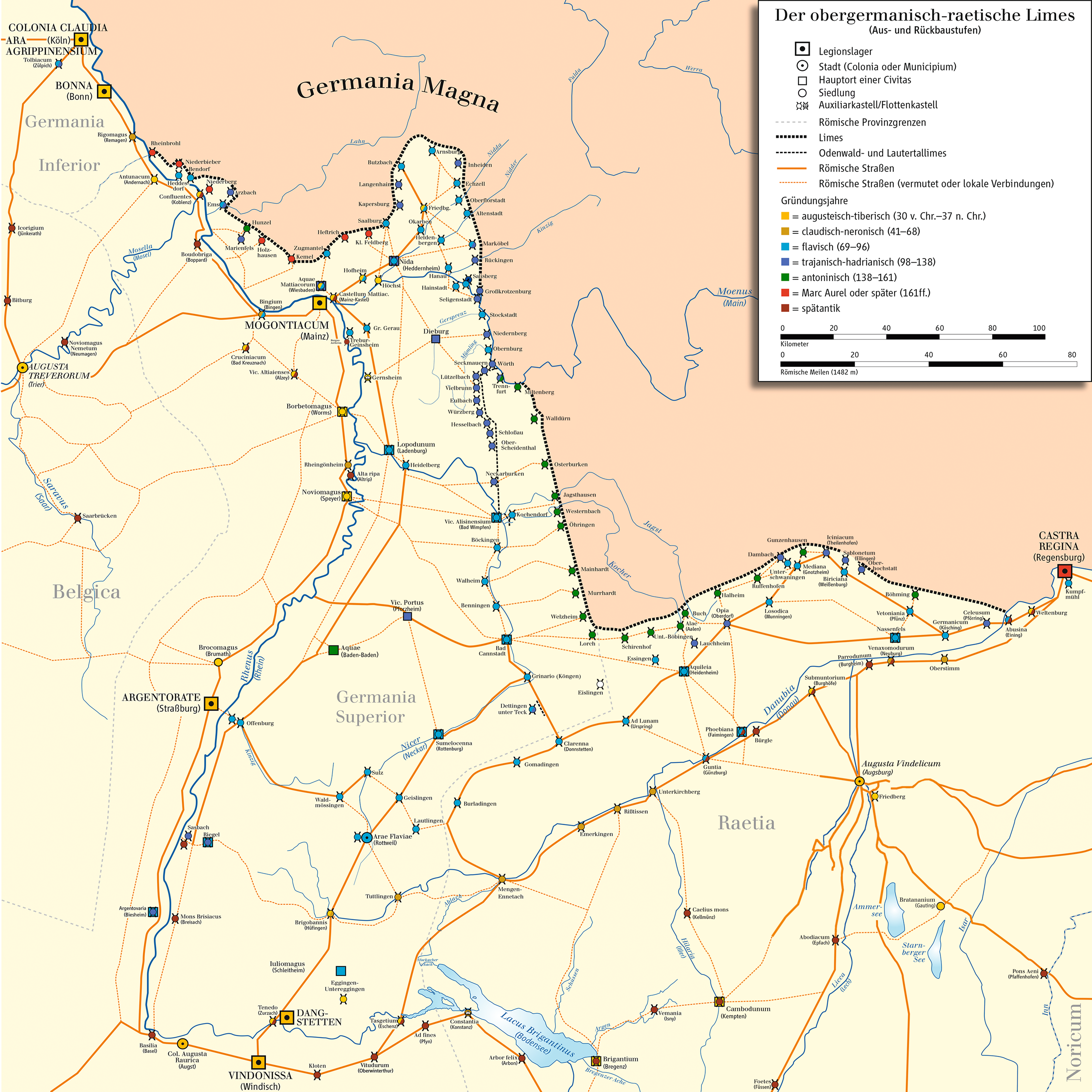
Forts on the Upper Germanic-Rhaetian and Danube-Iller-Rhine Limes

The Danube–Iller–Rhine Limes (German: Donau-Iller-Rhein-Limes) or DIRL was a large-scale defensive system of the Roman Empire that was built after the project for the Upper Germanic-Rhaetian Limes in the late 3rd century AD. In a narrower sense the term refers only to the fortifications between Lake Constance (Lacus Brigantinus) and the River Danube (Danubius); in a broader sense it also includes the other Late Roman fortifications along the river Rhine (Rhenus) on the High Rhine (between Lake Constance and Basle) and on the Upper Rhine (below Basle til Bingen) as well as the Upper Danube.

== Location and function ==
The mainly Alamannic raids, especially around the middle of the 3rd century AD, necessitated a new military security plan for the northwestern borders of the Roman Empire. The Upper German-Rhaetian Limes had never been thought of as a military defensive system and was therefore abandoned after 260 (the so-called Limesfall). The frontier troops were withdrawn to positions behind the more easily controlled rivers of the Rhine ("Rhenus"), Danube ("Danuvius") and Iller ("Hilaria"). Around 290, the systematic expansion of the new military border defences began.

The defensive facilities there, as illustrated by the large number of small fortresses, were not intended to ward off major attacks, but to ensure an almost unobstructed surveillance of the limes and deter plundering. Up to 378, the Romans invariably invaded the settlements of the Germani living beyond the limes (for example, under the emperors Julian Apostata or Gratian) to punish the tribes living there and intimidate them so that they refrained from attacks on the Empire. So late-Roman frontier defence was based, on the one hand, on the fortified belt of the Danube–Iller–Rhine Limes and, on the other hand, on offensive operations and preventive strikes in the tribal areas, as well as on alliances with Germanic princes. When around 400, these punitive expeditions were discontinued, the security situation deteriorated rapidly.

== Gallery ==
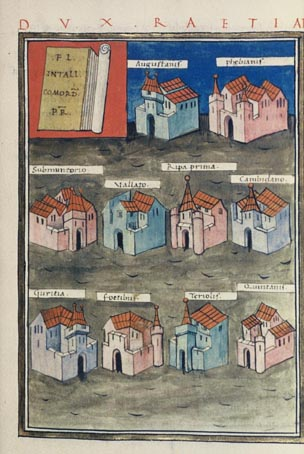
Notitia Dignitatum: the forts under the command of the Dux Raetiae

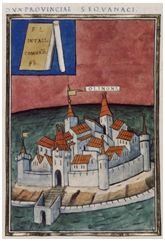
Painting of Castrum Olinone as a symbol of the responsibility of the Comes for the section of the Rhine Limes in the province of Maxima Sequanorum

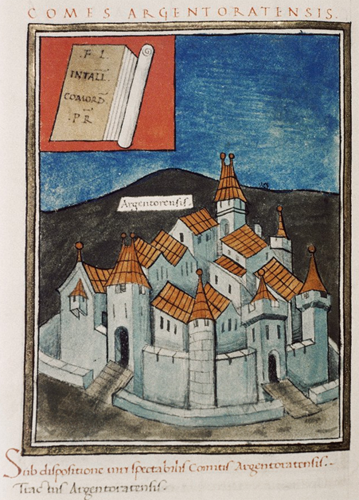
Notitia Dignitatum: painting of Castrum Argentoratum as a symbol of the responsibility of the Comes for the section of the Rhine Limes in the region around Argentorate

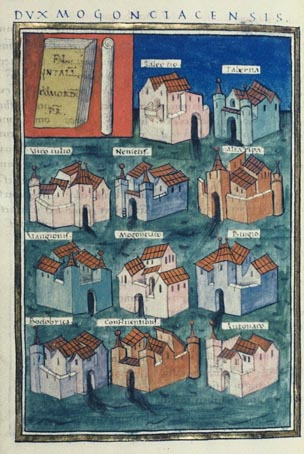
Notitia Dignitatum: the castra and fortified towns under the command of the Dux Mogontiacensis

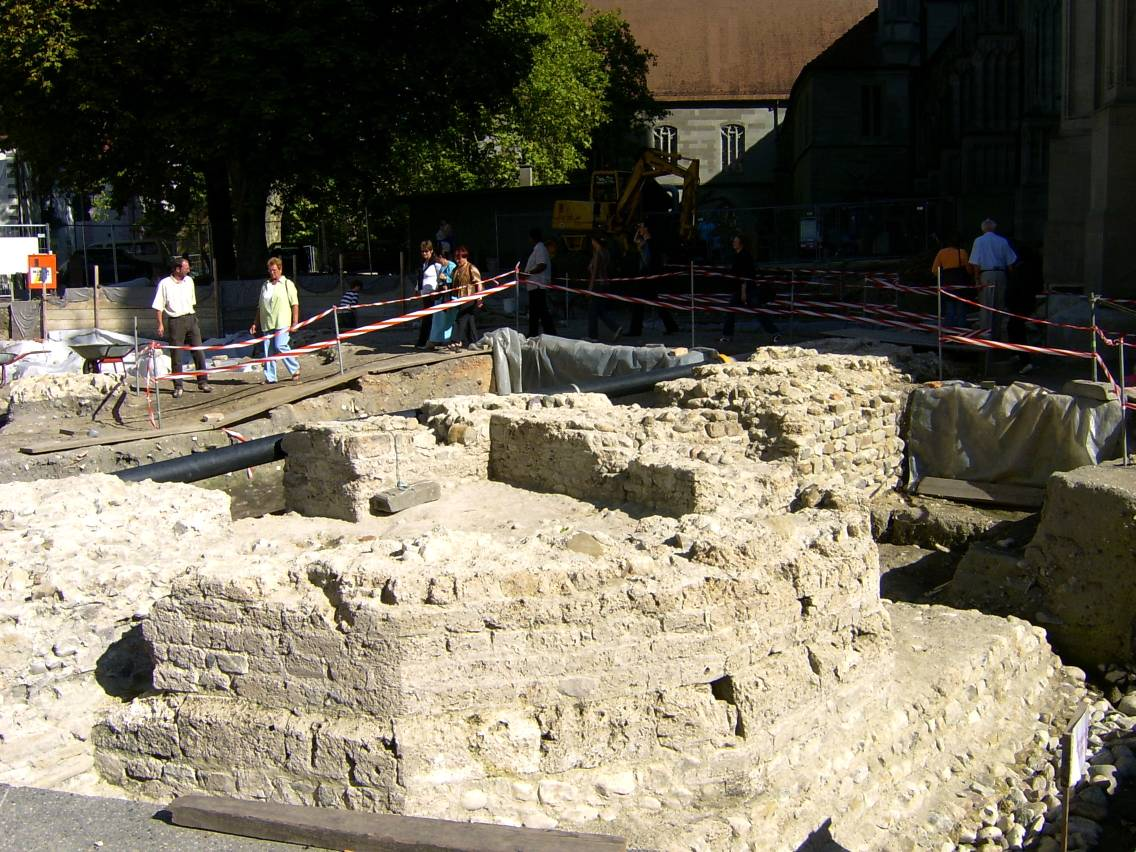
Remains of a Roman fighting tower in Constance (as at 2004)

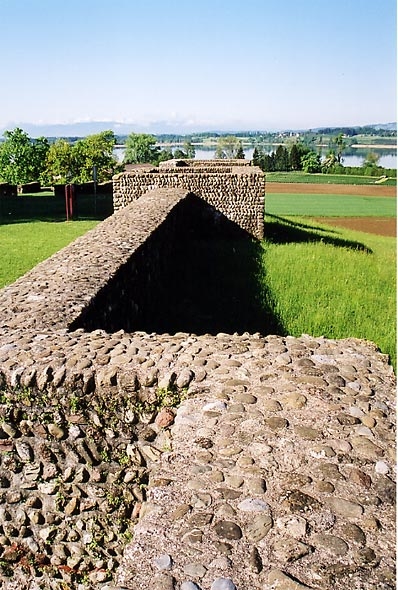
Enceinte of the road fort of Irgenhausen (CH)

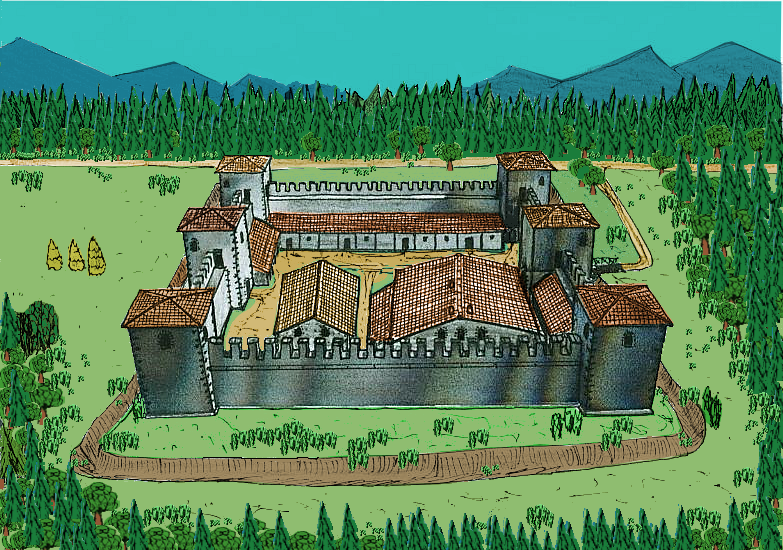
Artist's impression of the road fort of Schaan (LI)

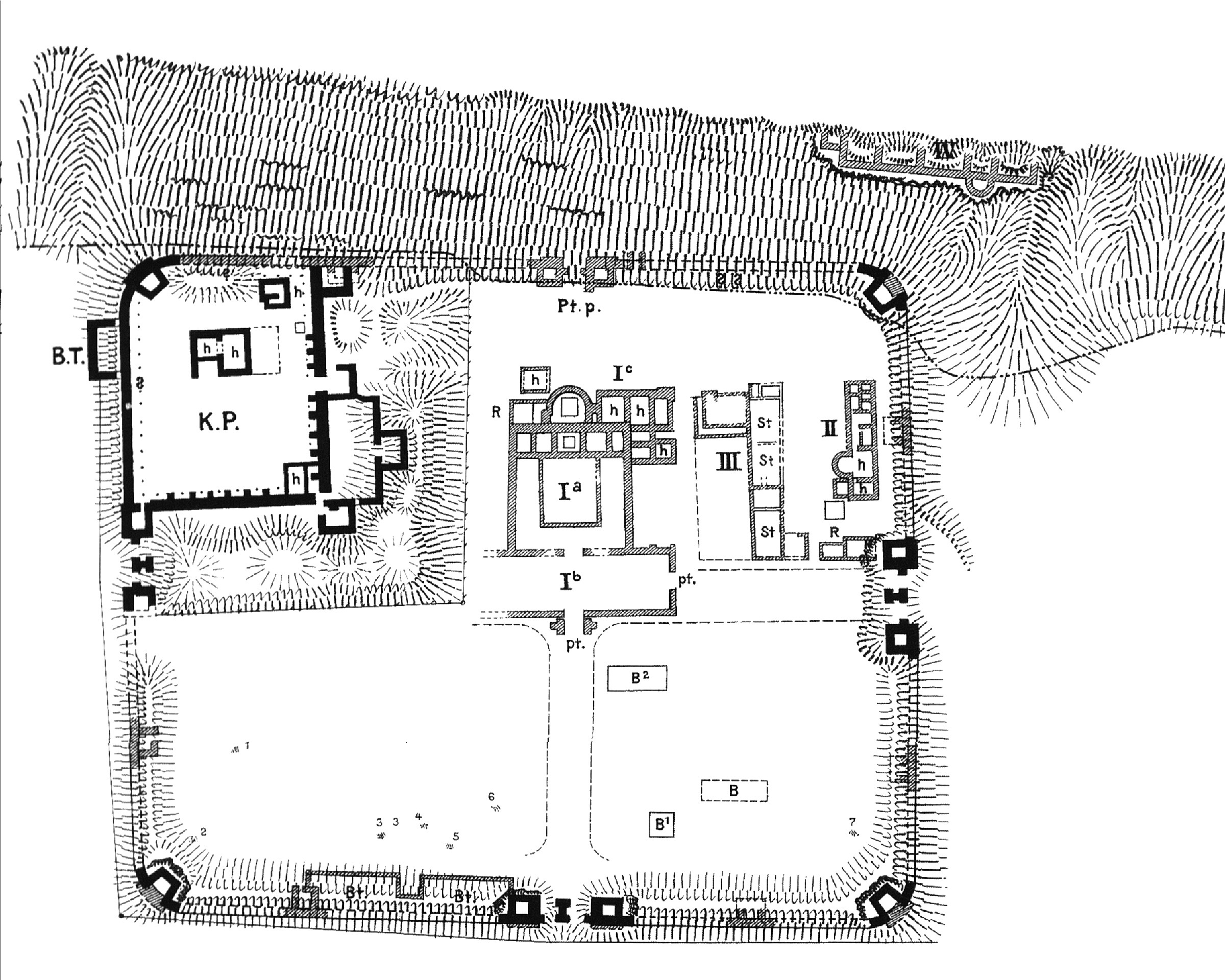
Ditch plan at Eining Roman Fort (D) with late antiquity reduction in the northwest corner of the castrum

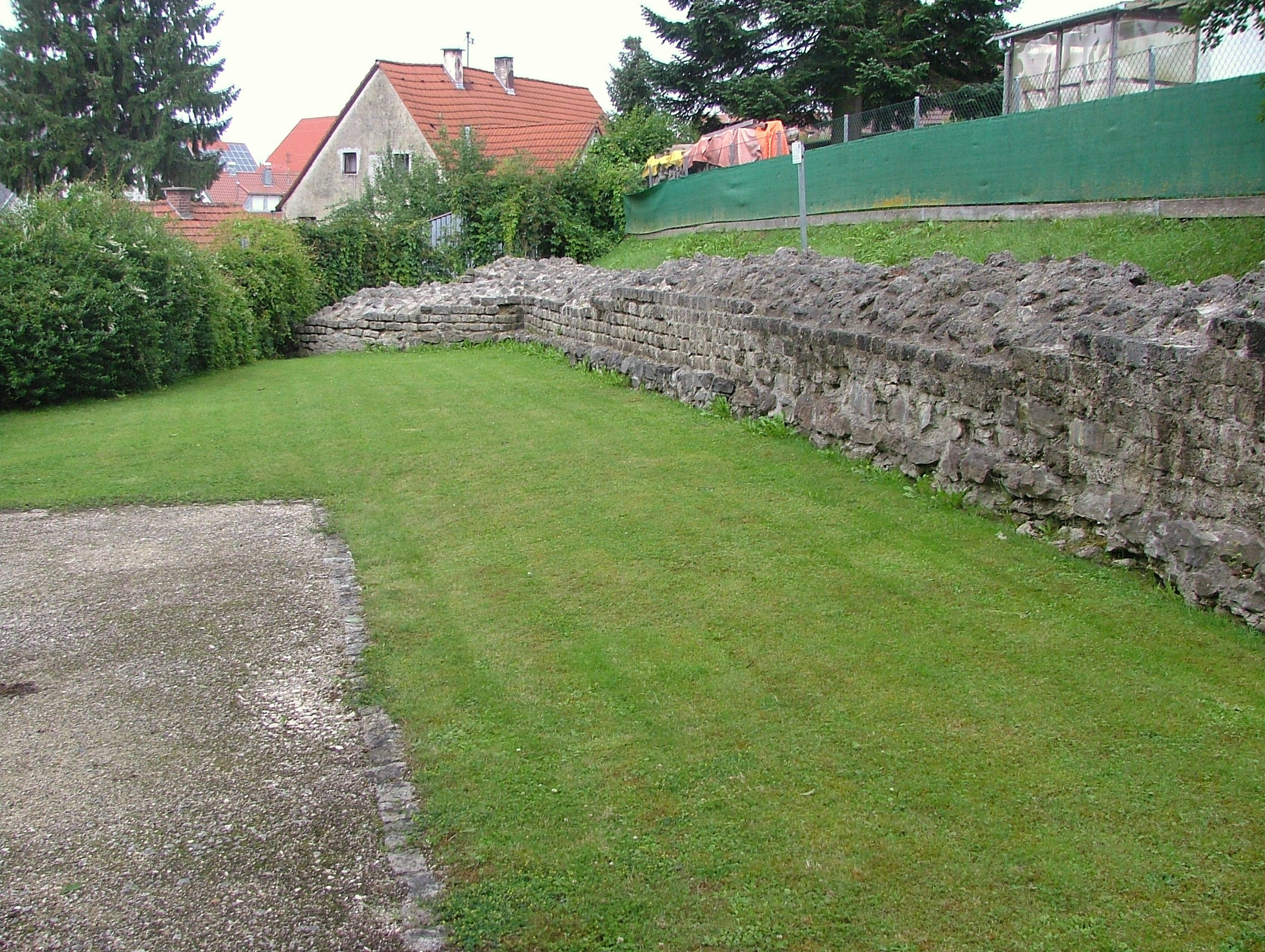
Reconstructed foundation walls of the fort of Caelius Mons (Kellmünz/D)

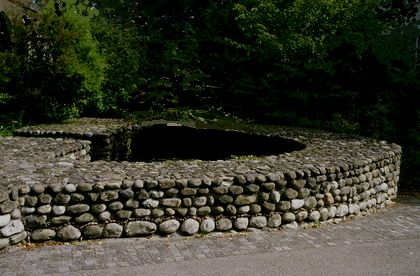
Preserved foundations of a late Roman horseshow tower in Arbon (CH)

== See also ==
- Limes (Roman Empire)

== Literature ==
- Burns, Thomas S. Barbarians Within the Gates of Rome: A Study of Roman Military Policy and the Barbarians, ca. 375-425 AD, Bloomington: IUP, 1994.
- Jochen Garbsch: Der spätrömische Donau-Iller-Rhein-Limes. (Kleine Schriften zur Kenntnis der römischen Besetzungsgeschichte Südwestdeutschlands 6), Stuttgart, 1970.
- Norbert Hasler, Jörg Heiligmann, Markus Höneisen, Urs Leutzinger, Helmut Swozilek: Im Schutze mächtiger Mauern. Spätrömische Kastelle im Bodenseeraum. publ. by the Archäologisches Landesmuseum Baden-Württemberg, Frauenfeld, 2005, ISBN 3-9522941-1-X.
- Michael Mackensen: Raetia: late Roman fortifications and building programmes. In: J. D. Creighton und R. J. A. Wilson (eds.): Roman Germany. Studies in Cultural Interaction (Journal Roman Arch. Suppl. 32), Portsmouth, 1999, pp. 199–244.
- Walter Drack, Rudolf Fellmann: Die Römer in der Schweiz, Stuttgart, 1988, pp. 64–71, ISBN 3-8062-0420-9.
- Erwin Kellner: Die Germanenpolitik Roms im bayerischen Anteil der Raetia secunda während des 4. und 5. Jahrhunderts. In: E. Zacherl (ed.): Die Römer in den Alpen. Historikertagung in Salzburg, Convegno Storico di Salisburgo, 13–15 November 1986, Bozen, 1989, pp. 205–211, ISBN 88-7014-511-5
- Michaela Konrad, Christian Witschel: Spätantike Legionslager in den Rhein- und Donauprovinzen des Imperium Romanum. In: M. Konrad, C. Witschel (ed.): Römische Legionslager in den Rhein- und Donauprovinzen, Munich, 2011, pp. 3–44.
- Sebastian Matz: Die ›Barbarenfurcht‹ und die Grenzsicherung des spätrömischen Reiches. Eine vergleichende Studie zu den limites an Rhein, Iller und Donau, in Syrien und Tripolitanien mit einem Fundstellenkatalog zum spätrömischen Rhein-Iller-Donau-Limes, Jena, 2014.
- Jördis Fuchs: Spätantike militärische horrea an Rhein und Donau. Eine Untersuchung der römischen Militäranlagen in den Provinzen Maxima Sequanorum, Raetia I, Raetia II, Noricum Ripense und Valeria., Diplomarbeit, Vienna, 2011.
