= Sig =

Sig used as a name may refer to:

- Sig (given name)
- Sig, Algeria, a city on the Sig River
- Sig Alert, an alert for traffic congestion in California, US
- Sig, Denmark, a village in West Jutland, Denmark
- Sig River or Mekerra, Algeria
- Sig (tanker)

sig (lower case) may refer to:

- sig (rune), an Armanen rune used as the Nazi SS symbol
- sig, sign language hand actions; see movement (sign language)
- .sig, a signature block in e-mail

sig as a loanword may refer to:

- Sig. (Italian), abbreviation of Signore
- Sig., patient instructions in a medical prescription

SIG (capitalized) may refer to:

- Fernando Luis Ribas Dominicci Airport San Juan, Puerto Rico, IATA code
- SIG (band), a Finnish band
- SIG Group, a Swiss packaging company and former railway vehicle and firearms manufacturer
- SIG plc, UK, formerly Sheffield Insulations Group plc
- SIG Sauer, the brand name used by firearms manufacturers and sister companies SIG Sauer AG from Switzerland, SIG Sauer Inc. of the United States and SIG Sauer GmbH of Germany
- S.I.G., call sign in the 1960s UK TV series Captain Scarlet and the Mysterons
- 15 cm sIG 33 (Schweres Infanterie Geschütz), German WWII gun
- Signal (IPC), which all have names beginning with SIG

Sig as an abbreviation may refer to:

- Significant figures, a digit of a number within its measurement resolution; often abbreviated as "sig figs"
- "Sig", an abbreviation of the Greek letter Sigma, especially in the name of a fraternity or sorority

SIG as an acronym may refer to:

- Särskilda Inhämtningsgruppen, Swedish special forces unit 2007–2011
- Semen Indonesia Group, a cement company
- Shanghai International Group, financial group
- Special Interest Group, a general term
  - Examples include: Aviation SIG, Bluetooth SIG, Small Form Factor SIG
- Special Interrogation Group, UK WWII unit
- Special Investigation Group, New Zealand
- Strasbourg IG (Strasbourg Illkirch-Graffenstaden Basket), a French basketball club
- Susquehanna International Group, a trading firm

== See also ==
- Signature (disambiguation)
- Sigg (disambiguation)
