= Sigismund of Lithuania =

Sigismund of Lithuania may refer to:

- Sigismund Kęstutaitis (ca. 1365 – 1440), Grand Duke Sigismund I of Lithuania
- Sigismund I the Old of Poland (1467–1548), who was also Grand Duke Sigismund II of Lithuania
- Sigismund II Augustus (1520–1572), King of Poland and Grand Duke Sigismund III of Lithuania
- Sigismund III Vasa (1566–1632 N.S.), head of the Polish-Lithuanian Commonwealth

== See also ==
- Sigismund (disambiguation)
- Sigmund (disambiguation)
