= Sig (given name) =

Sig (also found as Sieg) is a Germanic given name and name prefix (Sig-), meaning "victory". In Sweden, carriers of such names often get the nickname Sigge.

== Given Sig-names ==
- Sigge – (nickname for given Sig-names)

=== Female given names ===
- Sigdriva – ("victory driver")
- Signe – ("victory new")
- Sigrid – ("victory loved")
- Sigrun – ("victory rune")

=== Male given names ===
- Sigbjørn – ("victory bear")
- Sigfrid, Siegfried – ("victory peace")
- Sigmund, Siegmund, Sigismund – ("victory rower")
- Sigsten, Sighsten, Sixten – ("victory stone")
- Sigtrygg – ("victory trusty")
- Sigurd, Sigvard – ("victory warden")

== Historical forms ==
- Se-, See-
- Seg-, Segel-, Segi-
- Sei-, Sey-
- Si-, Sí-
- Sic-
- Sie-
- Sieg-, Sig-, Sigh-
- Sigan-
- Sige-
- Sigi-, Sigis-
- Sigr-
- Sigo-
- Sigu-, Sigur-
- Sii-
- Siigg-
- Sio-, Sjo-, Sju-, Sjug-
- Sy-, Syg-
- Sä-
- Søg-
- Zei-

== Notable people ==
Notable people with the given name include

- Sig Andrusking (1913–1994), American football player
- Sig Arno (1895–1975), German-Jewish film actor
- Sig Broskie (1911–1975), American baseball player
- Sig Gissler, American professor
- Sig Grava (1934–2009), American scholar
- Sig Gryska (1914–1994), American baseball player
- Sig Hansen (born 1966), American captain of the fishing vessel Northwestern on the TV series Deadliest Catch
- Sig Haugdahl (1891–1970), Norwegian racing driver
- Sig Herzig (1897–1985), American screenwriter
- Sig Jakucki (1909–1979), American baseball player
- Sig Libowitz (born 1968), American lawyer
- Sig Mejdal (born 1965), American baseball statisticians
- Sig Rogich (born 1944), Icelandic-American businessman
- Sig Ruman (1884–1967), German-American actor
- Sig Shore (1919–2006), American film director

Fictional characters

- Sig, a character from the Jak & Daxter video game series
- Sig, a character from the Puyo Puyo video game series

== See also ==
- Sig (disambiguation)
