= Sigg (disambiguation) =

Sigg may refer to:

- SIGG, Sigg Switzerland AG is a Swiss manufacturing company with its headquarters in Frauenfeld

Sigg is also a surname and may refer to:

- Austin Sigg (born 1995), American murderer of Jessica Ridgeway
- Eugen Sigg (1898–1974), Swiss rower
- Ferdinand Sigg (1902–1965), European bishop
- Fredy Sigg (1923–1998), Swiss designer and cartoonist
- Oswald Sigg (born 1944), Swiss journalist
- Uli Sigg (born 1946), Swiss businessman, diplomat, art collector
- Viviane Sigg (born 1980), German politician

== See also ==
- Sig (disambiguation)
