= Siegemund =

Siegemund is a German surname. Notable people with the surname include:

- Björn Siegemund (born 1973), German badminton player
- Justine Siegemund (1636–1705), German midwife and writer
- Laura Siegemund (born 1988), German tennis player

== See also ==
- Sigmund (disambiguation)
