= Sixten =

Sixten, Sigsten or Sighsten ("victory stone"; cf. the surname Segersten) the is a masculine given name of Swedish origin, consisting of the lead Sig- ("victory"), and the follower sten ("stone"). It is earliest attested in a runestone as ᛋᛁᚴᛋᛏᛅᛁᚾ (sikstain, /sigstæin/). People named Sixten include:

- Sixten Boström (born 1963), Finnish football player and manager
- Sixten Ehrling (1918–2005), Swedish conductor
- Sixten Franzén (1919–2008), Swedish scientist, inventor of pointcytology
- Sighsten Herrgård (1943–1989), Finnish-born Swedish fashion designer
- Sixten Isberg (1921–2012), Swedish alpine skier
- Sixten Jansson (1913–2006), Swedish canoeist
- Sixten Jernberg (1929–2012), Swedish cross-country skier
- Sixten Johansson (1910–1991), Swedish ski jumper
- Sixten Larsson (1918–1995), Swedish track athlete
- Sixten Mohlin (born 1996), Swedish footballer
- Sixten Kai Nielsen (born 1978), Danish artist
- Sixten Korkman (born 1948), Finnish economist
- Sixten Ringbom (1935–1992), Finnish art historian
- Sixten Sason (1912–1967), Swedish industrial designer
- Sixten Sild (born 1964), Estonian orienteer
- Sixten Sparre (1854–1889), Swedish dragoon lieutenant
- Sixten Sundström (1897–1960), Swedish track and field athlete
- Sixten Veit (born 1970), German football player
- Sixten Wackström (born 1960), Finnish cyclist

== See also ==
- Fredrik Sixten (born 1962), Swedish composer, organist and conductor
- Sven Sixten (1929–2001), Swedish priest, author and poet
