= Siegfried =

Siegfried is a German-language male given name, composed from the Germanic elements sig "victory" and frithu "protection, peace". The German name has the Old Norse cognate Sigfriðr, Sigfrøðr, which gives rise to Swedish Sigfrid (hypocorisms Sigge, Siffer), Danish/Norwegian Sigfred. In Norway, Sigfrid is given as a feminine name.

The name is medieval and was borne by the legendary dragon-slayer also known as Sigurd. It did survive in marginal use into the modern period, but after 1876 it enjoyed renewed popularity due to Wagner's Siegfried.

Notable people with the name include:

== Medieval ==
- Siegfried, Count of Merseburg (died 937)
- Siegfried I the Older, Count of Walbeck (died 990)
- Siegfried, Count of the Ardennes (c. 922–998), founder of Luxembourg
- Siegfried I, Count of Stade (before 929–after 961)
- Siegfried (bishop of Piacenza) (died 1031)
- Siegfried II, Count of Stade (c. 956–1037)
- Sigfrid of Sweden (died 1045), English missionary to Sweden and patron saint of Växjö
- Siegfried I, Count of Sponheim (c. 1010–1065)
- Siegfried I (archbishop of Mainz) (died 1084)
- Siegfried of Ballenstedt (c. 1075–1113)
- Siegfried IV, Count of Northeim-Boyneburg and Homburg (fl. 12th century)
- Siegfried (archbishop of Bremen) (1132–1184)
- Siegfried III, Count of Weimar-Orlamünde (c. 1155 – 1206)
- Siegfried II (archbishop of Mainz) (died 1230)
- Siegfried III (archbishop of Mainz) (died 1249)
- Siegfried I, Prince of Anhalt-Zerbst (c. 1230 – 1298)
- Siegfried II of Westerburg (before 1260–1297)
- Siegfried II of Querfurt (died 1310)
- Siegfried von Feuchtwangen (died 1311), 15th Grand Master of the Teutonic Knights
- Sigfrid of Pannonhalma (died 1365), Hungarian abbot

== Modern ==
- Siegfried Lipiner (1856–1911), Austrian poet and author
- Siegfried Wagner (1869–1930), German composer, conductor, and opera director, son of Richard Wagner
- Siegfried "Fritz" Flesch (1872–1939), Austrian saber fencer
- Siegfried Translateur (1875–1944), Austrian composer of dance music
- Siegfried Sassoon (1886–1967), English poet, named Siegfried by his mother because of her love of Wagner's operas
- Siegfried Kracauer (1889–1966), German writer, journalist, sociologist, cultural critic, and film theorist
- Siegfried Aram (1891–1978), German lawyer and cultural politician
- Siegfried Bernfeld (1892–1953), Austrian psychologist, educator, and writer
- Siegfried Kasche (1903–1947), German Nazi Storm Trooper officer and ambassador executed for war crimes
- Siegfried Uiberreither (1908–1984), Austrian Nazi Gauleiter and Reichsstatthalter
- Siegfried Fehmer (1911–1948), German Nazi Gestapo officer executed for war crimes
- Siegfried Seidl (1911–1947), Austrian Nazi commander of the Theresienstadt concentration camp executed for war crimes
- Siegfried Lowitz (1914–1999), German actor
- Siegfried Rapp (1915–1982), one-armed German pianist
- Siegfried Freytag (1919–2003), German World War II Luftwaffe pilot
- Siegfried Buback (1920–1977), Attorney General of Germany
- Siegfried Lenz (1926–2014), German writer
- Siegfried Böhm (1928–1980), East German politician
- Siegfried Ziering (1928–2000), German-born American business executive, playwright and philanthropist
- Siegfried Großmann (1930–2025), German theoretical physicist
- Siegfried Rauch (1932–2018), German actor
- Siegfried Wustrow (1936–2023), German cyclist
- Siegfried Fischbacher (1939–2021), German-American magician
- Siegfried Jerusalem (born 1940), German operatic tenor
- Siegfried Melzig (1940–2023), German football player and manager
- Siegfried Zielinski (born 1951), German media theorist

== Fictional characters ==
- Sigurd or Siegfried, the legendary dragon-slaying hero in Nibelungenlied
  - Siegfried, leading character in the opera of the same name
  - Die Nibelungen: Siegfried, the first of Fritz Lang's two-film series, Die Nibelungen
- Siegfried, a character in History's Strongest Disciple Kenichi
- Siegfried (Get Smart), fictional character in 1960s American spy comedy television series Get Smart
- Siegfried, a principal character in the ballet Swan Lake
- Siegfried Farnon, one of the main characters in All Creatures Great and Small
- Siegfried, a character in the Soulcalibur series of fighting games
- Dubhe Alpha Siegfried, Saint Seiya anime series character
- Siegfried Kircheis, a character in the series of Japanese science fiction novels Legend of the Galactic Heroes
- Siegfried, a recurring demon in the Shin Megami Tensei video game series
- Siegfried, the Saber of Black in the anime Fate/Apocrypha
- Siegfried of Denesle, a side character in the video game series The Witcher

== See also ==
- Sig (given name)
