= King Sigismund of Poland =

King Sigismund of Poland may refer to:

- Sigismund I the Old (1467–1548), King of Poland, Grand Duke of Lithuania
- Sigismund II Augustus (1520–1572), King of Poland, Grand Duke of Lithuania
- Sigismund III Vasa (1566–1632), King of Poland, Sweden and Grand Duke of Lithuania

== See also ==
- Sigismund (disambiguation)
