= Sigismund I =

Sigismund I may refer to:

- Sigismund of Burgundy (died 524), King of the Burgundians
- Sigismund I, Prince of Anhalt-Dessau (died 1405)
- Sigismund, Holy Roman Emperor (1368–1437)
- Sigismund I of Lithuania (c. 1365 – 1440)
- Sigismund, Archduke of Austria (1427–1496)
- Sigismund of Bavaria (1439–1501), Duke of Bavaria
- Sigismund I the Old (1467–1548), King of Poland and Grand Duke of Lithuania

== See also ==
- Sigismund III Vasa (1566–1632), the first (and currently only) Sigismund to have reigned over Sweden
- Sigismund (disambiguation)
