= Signature (disambiguation) =

A signature is a mark used to confirm a person's identity or intent.

Signature may also refer to:

== Businesses and organizations ==
- Signature (charity), for deaf communication activities in the UK
- Signature, a clothing brand of Levi Strauss & Co.
- Signature (dance group) English Bhangra dance duo Suleman Mirza and Madhu Singh
- Signature (typography journal), a 20th-century British journal
- Signature (whisky), an Indian whisky brand
- Signature Books, a publisher of Mormon works
- Signature Flight Support, a British fixed-base operator
- Signatures (restaurant), former restaurant once owned by Washington lobbyist Jack Abramoff
- Signature School, a charter school in Evansville, Indiana
- Signature Team, a French motor racing team
- Signature Theatres, a movie theatre chain

== Computing ==
- Signature block, text automatically appended at the bottom of electronic messages
- Electronic signature, a digital form of identity or intent validation
- File signature, data used to identify or verify the contents of a file
- Type signature, a definition of the inputs and outputs for a function or method
- XML Signature, a W3C recommendation

== Cryptography ==
- Blind signature, a digital signature used to validate a disguised message
- Digital signature (or public-key digital signature), a method for authenticating information
- Key signature (cryptography), the result of applying a hash function on a key

== Mathematics ==
- Signature (logic), a description of a set of function and relation symbols in mathematical logic
- Signature (permutation), a measure for the number of pairs a permutation maps out of order
- Signature (quadratic form), the number of positive, negative, or null terms of a quadratic form
- Signature (topology) of a 4k-dimensional compact oriented manifold
- Signature of a knot, in knot theory
- Prime signature, the multiset of exponents in the prime factorisation of a number
- Signature (matrix), the difference of the positive and negative eigenvalues of a matrix
- Metric signature of the metric tensor on a pseudo-Riemannian manifold

== Music ==
- Key signature, symbols placed on the staff designating notes to be played sharp or flat
- Signature (Moya Brennan album), 2006
- Signature (Joe album), 2009
- Signature (Patrice Rushen album), 1997
- Signature, a 2021 EP by the Filipino singer Morissette
- Signature Records, a mid-20th century United States-based record label
- Time signature, indicating how many beats are in each measure

== Science ==
- Acoustic signature, a combination of acoustic emissions
- Isotopic signature, a characteristic set of ratios of stable or unstable isotopes
- Metric signature, in physics, the form of a metric tensor: the sign of the diagonal components
  - Signature change, in relativity
- Radar cross-section
- Spectral signature, the specific combination of varying wavelengths reflected and absorbed which can uniquely identify an object

== Bookbinding ==
- Signature (bookbinding), a group of sheets folded in half
- Signature mark, a mark at the bottom of a group of sheets to assist in collation
- An alternative word for section (bookbinding)

== Other uses ==
- Signature Bridge, over the Yamuna river, Delhi, India
- Signature crime, a crime which exhibits characteristics unique to an offender's psychology
- Signature Place, a residential skyscraper in St. Petersburg, Florida

== See also ==
- Cignature, a South Korean girl group
- Signature file, any of several types of computer files
- Digital Signature Algorithm, a United States Federal Government standard
- ElGamal signature scheme
- Signature song, the song or songs a performer is most identified with
- Signatory (disambiguation)
- Doctrine of signatures, the notion that the appearance of plants is a function of their celestial influences
- Seal (East Asia), stamps used for identity or validation
