= Sigismunda =

Sigismunda may refer to the following fictional characters:

- English translation of Ghismonda from the novella "The Tale of Ghismonda and Guiscardo" from Boccaccio's The Decameron, see Sigismunda Mourning over the Heart of Guiscardo, painting
- Sigismunda from Tancred and Sigismunda, British tragedy inspired by Boccacio's
- Sigismunda from Los trabajos de Persiles y Sigismunda by Cervantes
- Sigismunda Conrad from the 2025 British novel We Live Here Now

== See also ==
- Sigismund
- Tancred and Gismund
