= Zygmund =

Given name

Zygmund is a given name and a surname, a cognate of Sigmund.

- Antoni Zygmund, Polish-American mathematician
- Zygmund Sazevich, American sculptor
