= Sigmund (given name) =

- Pronunciation: /ˈsɪɡmənd/ German: [ˈziːkmʊnt] Polish: [ˈɕiɡmunt]
- Gender: Male
- Language: Germanic languages

Origin
- Meaning: Protective Victory
- Region of origin: Northwestern and Northern Europe

Other names
- Alternative spelling: Siegmund
- Nickname: Sig
- Derived: segaz "victory" + mundō "hand, protection"
- Related names: Sigismund, Zygmund, Zygmunt

Sigmund, also spelled Siegmund, is a Germanic given name with roots in proto-Germanic *segaz and *mundō, giving a rough translation of "protection through victory".

== People with this name ==
- Sigmund Ahnfelt, Swedish major general
- Sigmund Borgundvåg, Norwegian naval architect
- Sigmund Brouwer, Canadian author
- Sigmund von Erlach, Swiss military commander
- Sigmund Fraenkel, Polish-Austrian chemist
- Sigmund Freud, Austrian psychologist
- Sigmund Freudenberger, Swiss painter
- Sigmund von Haimhausen, Bavarian aristocrat
- Sigmund Hecht (1849–1925), Hungarian-born American Reform rabbi
- Sigmund Esco "Jackie" Jackson, African-American singer in the Jackson 5
- Sigmund Jähn, East German cosmonaut
- Siegmund Klein (1902–1987), American bodybuilder
- Sigmund Mifsud, Maltese musician
- Sigmund Moren, Norwegian philologist
- Sigmund Mowinckel, Norwegian professor and theologian
- Siegmund Nimsgern, German bass-baritone
- Sigmund Rascher, German SS doctor
- Sigmund Romberg, Hungarian composer
- Sigmund Ruud, Norwegian ski jumper
- Sigmund Kvaløy Setreng, Norwegian philosopher and activist
- Sigmund Skard, Norwegian poet
- Sigmund Sommer, American builder
- Sigmund Sternberg, Hungarian-British businessman and philanthropist
- Sigmund Widmer (1919–2003), Swiss politician
- Sigmund Zois, Carniolan nobleman

== Mythological and fictional characters ==
- Sigmund (also Siegmund), a hero in Norse mythology
- Siegmund, a focal character in Richard Wagner's Die Walküre
- Sigmund (comics), Doctor Sigmund, a Dutch comics character
- Siegmund, a fictional lance wielded by Ephraim in video game Fire Emblem: The Sacred Stones
- Sigmund the Sorcerer, a fictional character from the kids' TV show Fanboy & Chum Chum
- Sigmund, the titular sea monster of the kids' TV show from the 1970s, Sigmund and the Sea Monsters

== See also ==
- Sig (given name)
- Sigmund (disambiguation), other meanings
- Sigismund
- Zygmunt, a list of people with the given name or surname Zygmunt, Zigmunt or Zigmund
