= Shanghai International Group =

Chinese state-owned financial services corporation

Shanghai International Group (SIG; Chinese: 上海国际集团有限公司) is a large state owned financial holding group of People's Republic of China. SIG has full financial licenses in China and is engaged in Commercial Banking, Investment Banking, Mutual Fund, Insurance, Private Equity, Trust, Assets Management, etc. As of the end of 2012, according to the equity method accounting, the total assets on SIG's consolidated financial statements were RMB 129.723 billion yuan, the net assets RMB 89.756 billion yuan, and the total profit RMB 12.367 billion yuan. The data relevant to SIG's controlling and core investments shows that the assets managed by SIG had reached RMB 1118.487 billion yuan by the end of 2012.

== History ==
Shanghai International Group Co., Ltd. (SIG) was founded on April 20, 2000, with a registered capital of RMB 10.56 billion yuan.

== Function ==
SIG performs three major functions, namely, investment holding, capital operation, and state-owned assets management. SIG is engaged in business activities including financial investments as a focus, non-financial investments as supplement, capital operation and assets management.

== Business ==
SIG owns stakes in several financial institutions including Shanghai Pudong Development Bank, Guotai Junan Securities Co, Hua An Fund Management Co and China International Fund Management Co Ltd.

Ever since its establishment, SIG has been expanding its territory in financial investment. For example, SIG becomes the largest shareholder of Shanghai Pudong Development Bank Co., Ltd., Shanghai Rural Commercial Bank Co., Ltd., Guotai Junan Securities Co., Ltd., Anxin Agricultural Insurance Co., Ltd., Dazhong Insurance Co., Ltd. and other companies. SIG set up two joint ventures. One is China International Fund Management Co., Ltd. with JP Morgan which is one of the world's asset management companies. The other refers to Tullett Prebon SITICO (China) Ltd., the first inter-dealer broker in China, with Tullett Prebon (Europe) Ltd., a company of Collins Stewart Tullett Group which is the second inter-dealer broker in the world. SIG also incorporated the companies including HuaAn Fund Management Co., Ltd., Shanghai Guosheng Pawn Co., Ltd., Shanghai Re-guarantee Co., Ltd. and Shanghai Equity Exchange.

At the same time, SIG set up Sailing Capital Management Co., Ltd., a company raised and run Sailing International Investment Fund; established GP Capital Co., Ltd., a company raised and run Shanghai Financial Sector Investment Fund with the approval of the State Council of the People's Republic of China; incorporated Shanghai Guohe Modern Service Industry Equity Investment Management Co., Ltd., a company raised and run Shanghai Guohe Modern Service Industry Private Equity Fund., and incorporated Shanghai Real Power Capital Co., Ltd., a company raised and run Shanghai Real Power Emerging Industry Investment Fund. Last but not the least, SIG has also participated in establishing Shanghai Shipping Industry Fund Management Co., Ltd.. SIG's subsidiaries also include Shanghai International Trust Co., Ltd., Shanghai Securities Co., Ltd., Shanghai State-owned Assets Operation Co., Ltd., SIG Asset Management Co., Ltd., SIG Financial Services Co., Ltd., Shanghai International Group (Hong Kong) Co., Limited, Shanghai International Group Venture Capital Co., Ltd., SIG Investment and Development Co., Ltd. and Shanghai Huadong Enterprises Co., Ltd.

Shanghai International Trust & Investment Co., Ltd. was the predecessor of SIG.

== See also ==
- China International Capital Corp
- CITIC Securities
- Economy of China
- Chinese financial system
- Banking in China
