= Aviation Special Interest Group =

The Aviation Special Interest Group
- Website type: Aviation message forum
- Founders: John B. Galipault, Sandy Trevor
- Website: www.avsig.com
- Users: 1300 (As of February, 2013)
- Launched: 1981; 45 years ago
- Current status: Active

The Aviation Special Interest Group (AVSIG) is a well known aviation message forum. It began life as a computer-bulletin board system on CompuServe Information Service before the start of the Internet proper.

The organisation itself claims to be the world's oldest continually-operated online forum. It was founded by The Aviation Safety Institute's John B. Galipault (1930–1993) and Sandy Trevor on the CompuServe Information Service in 1981. Forum participants represent all areas of the aviation industry, and core discussion ranges from airmanship to regulatory issues. The "Special Interest Group" phraseology in "Aviation Special Interest Group" derives from the CompuServe service command line navigation convention where discussion forums were prefaced by SUBJECT/SIG, as in "AVIATION/SIG" or "AVSIG." AVSIG was the first "SIG" discussion site on the CompuServe service. The Aviation Safety Institute moved the AVSIG forum to the web concurrent with its termination of a hosting contract with CompuServe in 2004. AVSIG is the world's oldest continuously-operated online forum and one of a handful of pre-web online discussion forums operating today. The forum is noted for requiring real names for posting to encourage both authenticity and polite discourse. As of February, 2013 the AVSIG forum has registered over 1,300 users.
