= Fredy Sigg =

Swiss designer and cartoonist (1923–1998)

- Born: 1923; Switzerland
- Died: 1998 (aged 74–75); Switzerland
- Occupations: Designer, cartoonist
- Known for: caricatures for Swiss newspapers (1960s–1980s)
- Spouse(s): Tatjana Kürschner (m. 1948); Johanna Büchle (m. 1953); Edith Thalmann (m. 1961)

Fredy Sigg (1923–1998) was a Swiss designer and cartoonist. He was known nationwide for his caricatures during the 1960s to 1980s. He was active as a free-lance graphicist and illustrator from 1947. From 1958 he worked as a caricaturist for the Nebelspalter, Weltwoche and Beobachter newspapers, later also for Züri-Woche, Schweizerische Handelszeitung and Annabelle. Sigg married three times; Tatjana Kürschner (1948), Johanna Büchle (1953) and Edith Thalmann (1961).
