= Signatory =

Signatory may refer to:

- The writer of a signature
  - Signatory state, a country that has signed a treaty
- Signatory Vintage Scotch Whisky Company, owner of the Edradour distillery

== See also ==
- House of the Signatories, a Lithuanian historic landmark
