= Sigmund (disambiguation) =

Sigmund or Siegmund may refer to:

== People ==
- Sigmund (given name), list of people with the name Sigmund
- Sigmund Freud, an Austrian neurologist

== Arts and entertainment ==
- Sigmund and the Sea Monsters, American 1970s TV series

Fictional characters

- Sigmund (also Siegmund), a hero in Norse mythology
- Siegmund, a focal character in Richard Wagner's Die Walküre
- Sigmund (comics), Doctor Sigmund, a Dutch comics character

== Others ==
- SS Siegmund, a cargo ship in service 1926-29

== See also ==
- Sigismund (disambiguation)
- Zygmunt, a given name
