= Ferdinand Sigg =

Swiss bishop (1902–1965)

Ferdinand Sigg (22 March 1902 in Thalwil (Switzerland) – 27 October 1965 in Zürich (Switzerland)) was the first European bishop of the Central Conference of Middle and Southern Europe of the Methodist Episcopal Church

He grew up in a Methodist workman family. From 1923 to 1927 he studied at the Methodist seminary in Frankfurt, Germany.

In 1929 he married Alice Mumenthaler. After completing his studies, he worked in the Methodist congregation of Basel and then became secretary of bishop John Louis Nuelsen. 1936 in an economical crises he became director of the Swiss Methodist publishing house in Zurich. In this position he contributed a lot after World War II to rebuild the completely destroyed German publishing house in Frankfurt. As publisher, his concerns were the role of laity in church, the role of the church in society, socialism and church, and world mission.

Long before he became bishop, Sigg was engaged in ecumenic work. From 1942 he was the representative of the Methodist Episcopal Church in the Swiss Evangelical Church Federation (comprising the Reformed state churches of all cantons and the Methodist Episcopal Church). 1948 he took part as interpreter at the constituting conference of the World Council of Churches in Amsterdam, Netherlands.

1954, a few months after the death of his wife, he attended in Brussels, Belgium, the constituting conference of the newly created Central Conference of Middle and Southern Europe to which belonged the then Methodist Episcopal Church in Switzerland, France, Austria, Belgium, Poland, Czechoslovakia, Hungary, the former Yugoslavia, Bulgaria and the Methodist work in Algeria. Some of these countries were traditionally Catholic, others traditionally Orthodox or dominated by Islam. The majority of them was under communist rule and in some of them there was a heavy persecution of Methodists. Before the election of the bishop, Bishop Arthur James Moore stated: "Geographically, we are in an immense space, but our church is in the same relation small and modest. The future bishop will measured by the smallness of the work have a huge task which will put a heavy strain on his head and his hands, if he wants to create a living organism out of this motley central conference." Ferdinand Sigg was elected at the first ballot with 37 out of 38 votes. He dedicated himself to his office with sensitiveness and expert knowledge.

He continued to be active in the ecumenic movement by sharing his experiences about Christian service in Islamic Countries and his experience as publishing director with the World Council of Churches. He also took part in the commissions for creed and church constituency in Lund, 1952 and Montreal 1964.

On 27 October 1965, Ferdinand Sigg died unexpectedly in office. In 1966, Franz Schäfer was elected his successor as bishop.

== See also ==
- List of bishops of the United Methodist Church
