= Signature file =

Signature files are computer files of some kind of signature data, such as:

- signature values to be used in signature-based detection of viruses;
- in document retrieval, a quick and dirty filter that keeps all the documents that match to the query;
- a signature block automatically appended at the bottom of an email message;
- a digital signature;
- an electronic signature.
