= Sigbjørn =

Sigbjørn (Danish, Faroese, Norwegian) or Sigbjörn (Icelandic, Swedish) is a Nordic male given name, meaning Victory-bear (abbreviation of "Segerbjörn") and dating back to the Viking Age (Old Norse: Sigbiǫrn). A female form exist as Sigurbirna (Victory-bearess).

== Historic variants ==
- Sigbiorn (♂ male) – Old Swedish
- Sigbiǫrn (♂ male) – Old Norse
- Sigbjörn (♂ male) – Icelandic, Swedish
- Sigbjørn (♂ male) – Danish, Faroese, Norwegian
- Sigbjǫrn (♂ male) – Old Norse
- Sighbiorn (♂ male) – Old Danish, Old Swedish
- Sigurbirna (♀ female) – Icelandic
- Sigurbjarni (♂ male) – Icelandic
- Sigurbjörn (♂ male) – Icelandic
- Sigurbjørn (♂ male) – Faroese, Norwegian

== Notable people named Sigbjørn ==
Notable people with the given name include:

- Sigbjørn Apeland (born 1966), Norwegian musician and scientist
- Sigbjørn Eriksen (1936–2021), Norwegian politician
- Sigbjørn Gjelsvik (born 1974), Norwegian politician
- Sigbjørn Hølmebakk (1922–1981), Norwegian author
- Sigbjørn Johnsen (born 1950), Norwegian politician
- Sigbjørn Larsen (born 1936), Norwegian politician
- Sigbjørn Molvik (born 1950), Norwegian politician
- Sigbjørn Mustad (1897–1970), Norwegian lawyer and politician
- Sigbjørn Obstfelder (1866–1900), Norwegian writer and poet
- Sigbjørn Bernhoft Osa (1910–1990), Norwegian fiddler and traditional folk musician
- Sigbjørn Ravnåsen (1941–2016), Norwegian researcher, principal and politician
