= Sigvard =

Sigvard may refer to:

- Sigvard Bernadotte (1907–2002), Swedish industrial designer
- Sigvard Eklund (1911–2000), director of the International Atomic Energy Agency security council
- Sigvard Ericsson (1930–2019), former speed skater
- Sigvard Hultcrantz (1888–1955), Swedish sport shooter
- Sigvard Johansson, Swedish sprint canoeist, competed in the mid-1950s
- Sigvard Munk (1891–1983), Danish politician for the Social Democratic Party
- Sigvard Sivertsen (1881–1963), Norwegian gymnast
- Sigvard Thurneman (1908–1979), the leader of the gang Sala gang (Salaligan)
