= Sven Sixten =

Swedish priest, author, and poet

Sven Sixten (1929–2001) was a Swedish priest, author and poet. He published three novels: Friday, The Last Days of Johansson and The Green Valley. He was the father to the prominent Swedish composer Fredrik Sixten
