= Sigismund =

Sigismund is an ancient Germanic given name, from Proto-Germanic *sigiz "victory" + *mundō "protection", recorded from the 5th century (Sigismund of Burgundy, c. 475–524) in the Kingdom of Burgundy. An older variant, Segimundus, was Latinized by Tacitus. In the later medieval period it became a standard name in the Austrian, German, Hungarian, and Polish-Lithuanian royal families.

The name is often confused with its cognates Sigmund and Siegmund. While Sigismund was derived from the East Germanic languages, particularly Burgundian or Gothic, the forms Siegmund and Sigmund trace their origins to the High German languages. In Slavic languages, the variants Zygmunt/Zikmund/Žigmund was adopted, notably in Czech, Serbo-Croatian, Slovak, and Polish. Other language variants of the name include Zsigmond in Hungarian, and also appeared in various forms across the Romance languages.

== Translations ==
- Belarusian: Жыгімонт, romanized: Žyhimont
- French: Sigismond
- Italian: Sigismondo, Gismondo
- Latin: Sigismundus
- Latvian: Sigismunds
- Lithuanian: Sigismundas, Žygimantas
- Portuguese: Sigismundo
- Russian: Сигизмунд, romanized: Sigizmund
- Spanish: Segismundo
- Ukrainian: Сигізмунд, romanized: Sigizmund

== People ==
=== European rulers ===
- Saint Sigismund of Burgundy (died 523), King of the Burgundians
- Sigismund I, Prince of Anhalt-Dessau (died 1405)
- Sigismund I the Old King of Poland and Grand Duke of Lithuania
- Sigismund II August King of Poland and Grand Duke of Lithuania
- Sigismund III Vasa King of Poland and Grand Duke of Lithuania, King of Sweden
- Sigismund, Holy Roman Emperor (1368–1437), known as Sigismund of Luxembourg, also King of Hungary and King of Bohemia
- Sigismund Kęstutaitis (c. 1365–1440), Grand Duke of Lithuania
- Sigismund Korybut (c. 1395-c. 1435), Lithuanian duke who participated in Hussite Wars
- Sigismund II, Prince of Anhalt-Dessau (died after 1452)
- Sigismund, Archduke of Austria (1427–1496), ruler of Further Austria
- Sigismund of Bavaria (1439–1501), Duke of Bavaria
- Sigismund von Herberstein (1486–1566), Carniolan diplomat, writer, historian and member of the Holy Roman Empire Imperial Council
- Sigismund of Brandenburg (1538–1566), Prince-Archbishop of Magdeburg and Administrator of the Prince-Bishopric of Halberstadt
- Sigismund Rákóczi (died 1608), briefly Prince of Transylvania
- Sigismund Báthory (1572–1613), Prince of Transylvania
- Sigismund Francis of Austria (1630–1665), ruler of Further Austria
- Prince Sigismund of Prussia (1864-1866)
- Prince Sigismund of Prussia (1896–1978)
- Ishak Bey Kraloğlu or Sigismund of Bosnia (born in the 1450s?), son of King Stephen Thomas of Bosnia
- John Sigismund, Elector of Brandenburg (1572–1618)

=== Others ===
- Sigismund Albicus (c. 1360–1427), Roman Catholic Archbishop of Prague
- Sigismund Bachrich (1841–1913), Hungarian composer, violinist and violist
- Sigismund Bacstrom (c. 1750-1805), German doctor, surgeon and scholar of alchemy
- Sigismund Payne Best (1885–1978), British secret agent during the First and Second World Wars
- Sigismund von Braun (1911–1998), German diplomat and Secretary of State
- Sigismund Danielewicz (1847–1927), California trade union organizer and anarchist
- Sigmund Freud (1856–1939), Austrian founder of psychoanalysis born Sigismund Schlomo Freud
- Sigismund Gelenius (1497–1554), Greek scholar and humanist
- Sigismund Goldwater (1873–1942), physician, hospital administrator, and New York City Commissioner of Health
- Sigismund von Götzen (1576–1650), German diplomat and politician
- Sigismund Ernst Hohenwart (1745–1825), Bishop of Linz
- Sigismund Koelle (1820–1902), German missionary and pioneer scholar of African languages
- Sigismund Ernst Richard Krone (1861–1917), German naturalist, zoologist, spelunker, archaeologist and researcher
- Sigismund Mendl (1866–1945), British politician
- Sigismund von Neukomm (1778–1858), Austrian composer and pianist
- Sigismund Felix Freiherr von Ow-Felldorf (1855–1936), Bishop of Passau
- Sigismund von Reitzenstein (1766–1847), first minister of state of the Grand Duchy of Baden
- Sigismund von Schlichting (1829–1909), Prussian general and military theorist
- Sigismund von Schrattenbach (1698–1771), Archbishop of Salzburg
- Sigismund Streit (1687–1775), German merchant and art patron in Venice
- Sigismund Zaremba (1861–1915), Polish composer

== Fictional characters ==
- Sigismund, a Space Marine character from the Warhammer 40,000 novel series, The Horus Heresy
- Sigismund Arbuthnot, the "mad maths master" in the Molesworth books
- Sigismund Dijkstra, "the witcher" in the Andrzej Sapkowski books

== See also ==
- Sigismund Bell, a bell in Wawel Cathedral in Kraków
- Sigmund (given name) for people named Sigmund or Siegmund
- Segismundo, main character of Calderón de la Barca's La vida es sueño
- Sigismunda
