= Die Nibelungen (1966–67 film) =

- Original film poster of part 1
- Directed by: Harald Reinl
- Written by: Harald G. Petersson, Harald Reinl, Ladislas Fodor
- Produced by: Artur Brauner
- Starring: Uwe Beyer; Karin Dor; Herbert Lom
- Cinematography: Ernst W. Kalinke
- Edited by: Hermann Haller
- Music by: Rolf A. Wilhelm
- Production companies: CCC Filmkunst, Avala Film
- Distributed by: Constantin Film
- Release dates: 1966 (part 1); 1967 (part 2)
- Running time: 91 minutes (part 1); 90 minutes (part 2)
- Country: West Germany
- Language: German

Die Nibelungen is a 1966/1967 West German fantasy film released in two parts, Siegfried von Xanten and Kriemhilds Rache (Kriemhild's Revenge). It was directed by Harald Reinl and produced by Artur Brauner. Die Nibelungen starred Uwe Beyer, Karin Dor and Herbert Lom. The two films were a remake of Fritz Lang's 1924 silent classic Die Nibelungen, which was in turn based on the epic poem the Nibelungenlied.

== Plot ==
=== Part 1: Siegfried ===
In Worms, capital of the kingdom of Burgundy, Rüdiger von Bechelaren, margrave of Bavaria, arrives in embassy with Blödelin, brother of king Etzel, in order to ask for the hand of Kriemhild, sister of King Gunther, for the king of the Huns, but she refuses. However, Giselher, the king's brother, and Rüdiger's daughter Hildegund fall in love, and Rüdiger happily consents to this marriage.

The minstrel Volker von Alzey then extols the virtues and exploits of the hero Siegfried of Xanten. Son of King Siegmund of Xanten, he finishes his apprenticeship with the dwarf Mime and forges a magnificent sword. Learning that the dragon Fafnir is terrorising the region, he decides to challenge him in his cave. He kills him and then follows the advice of a bird and bathes in the dragon's blood, which makes him invulnerable except for a spot on his back where an ash leaf has landed.

He ventures into the territory of the Nibelung and seizes their legendary treasure, stolen from the daughters of the Rhine by the king of the Dwarves, Alberich, as well as the magic helm which allows him to make himself invisible by pronouncing a magic formula. Siegfried then travels to Iceland, where he rescues the queen of the country, Brunhild, prisoner in a palace made inaccessible by the volcano. She falls in love with him and he promises to come back for her.

However, Siegfried arrives among the Burgundians and falls in love with Kriemhild, sister of King Gunther. After he helps King Gunther to repel an invasion of the King of Saxony, whom he takes prisoner, Gunther can no longer refuse Kriemhild's hand to Siegfried. One of his vassals, Hagen von Tronje, a man in black with an iron helm adorned with raven's feathers, makes a proposal: Siegfried will marry Kriemhild if he helps Gunther to obtain the hand of Brunhild. Using his strength and his magical helm, Siegfried helps Gunther to defeat Brunhild in the three trials that she imposes to her suitors. After returning to Worms and celebrating the double wedding, Brunhild resists the king's advances on their wedding night, so that Gunther is forced to ask again help from Siegfried: using his helm, he overpowers Brunhild and removes her magic belt, source of her power.

However, Kriemhild discovers what happened and, jealous of Brunhild's status as queen and rival for Siegfried's heart, she reveals in public to the new queen of the Burgundians the role played by Siegfried. Outraged, Brunhild demands the death of Siegfried from Gunther. A hunting party is organized and Kriemhild, thinking to protect her husband, shows Hagen where her husband's vulnerable spot is by sewing a cross on his tunic. Hagen points Siegfried to a spring of fresh water and hits him in his vulnerable spot with a javelin. Despite Kriemhild's despair, the Burgundian princes protect Hagen. She then swears that she will have no rest until Siegfried's murderer is punished.

=== Part 2: Kriemhild's vengeance ===
Kriemhild cannot forget Siegfried and his cowardly assassination by Hagen von Tronje, who remains the protégé of the Burgundian clan. She gives birth to a child conceived with Siegfried and she also decides to distribute the gold from the Nibelungen treasure, inherited from her husband, to the population, in order to turn them against Gunther and Hagen. The rest of the treasure is then stolen by Hagen, who throws it into the Rhine after getting rid of Alberich, who wanted to take it back. When Kriemhild decides to flee to Xanten, Hagen and Gunther agree to kidnap Siegfried's son and have him brought up in a monastery, so that one day he cannot be dangerous to them or lay claims to the throne. However, he dies while Kriemhild's convoy is attacked by Hagen's henchmen. Margrave Rüdiger saves Kriemhild and brings her to the Danube, where she accepts King Etzel's marriage proposal in order to carry out her revenge against Hagen.

Years later, a child is born, named Ortlieb, and the Burgundians are invited by Etzel to celebrate his baptism. On the road that takes them from Worms to Hungary, where Etzel and his court reside, Hagen talks to water fairies, who tell him that none of them will return alive except the chaplain. Hagen then kills the boatman who did not want to let them cross the river in his boat. After all the Burgundians have safely crossed, Hagen tries to drown the chaplain to thwart the prophecy; however, he manages to swim to the other side, and Hagen understands the veracity of the prediction, which he reveals to his companions. They are welcomed in Bavaria by Rüdiger, Giselher's father-in-law, and they are then taken to Etzel.

By order of Kriemhild, Etzel's brother Blödelin and his men try to provoke the Burgundians, but he ends up being killed by Hagen in self-defense. A gruesome slaughter ensues during the banquet, in which Ortlieb is killed by Hagen. When Etzel seeks retaliation, he himself narrowly escapes death. Kriemhild offers to let Gunther and her other relatives leave in exchange for Hagen's head, but they all refuse, so she orders to set on fire the palace where they are entrenched. Despite his daughter's tears, even Rüdiger has to fight his son-in-law Giselher, and they both mortally wound each other. Gernot is killed by the archers and only Hagen and Gunther escape.

Dietrich von Bern and his armourer Hildebrand finally manage to take Hagen and Gunther prisoners. Gunther stands by Hagen until the end and bleeds to death before Kriemhild's eyes, severely wounded. In rage, Kriemhild strikes Hagen with Siegfried's sword Balmung before killing herself with the same sword. Rüdiger's daughter Hildegund and the minstrel Volker von Alzey, who was blinded during the fight, are the only Burgundians to embark on the long march back home.

== Cast ==
- Uwe Beyer as Siegfried von Xanten
- Maria Marlow as Kriemhild
- Rolf Henniger as Gunther, king of the Burgundians
- Karin Dor as Brunhild, queen of Iceland
- Siegfried Wischnewski as Hagen of Tronje
- Herbert Lom as Etzel, king of the Huns
- Dieter Eppler as Rüdiger, Margrave at the court of Etzel
- Terence Hill as Giselher, Kriemhild's brother
- Fred Williams as Gernot, Kriemhild's brother
- Hans von Borsody as the minstrel Volker, the narrator
- Skip Martin as Alberich, king of the Dwarves
- Hilde Weissner as Ute, Kriemhild's mother
- Benno Hoffmann: Mime, dwarf smith
- Maria Hofen: Frigga, Brunhild's rune reader
- Samson Burke: Blödelin, Etzel's brother
- Christian Rode: Dietrich von Bern
- Friedrich von Ledebur: Hildebrand, Dietrich's armourer
- Barbara Bold: Hildegund, Rüdiger's daughter

== Production ==
Die Nibelungen is a remake of the eponymous 1924 silent film directed by Fritz Lang. Lang's film had also been released in two parts (Siegfried and Kriemhilds Rache) and was based on a screenplay written by Lang and his wife, Thea von Harbou. The original source for the story was the Middle High German epic poem Das Nibelungenlied, likely written around the year 1200. This in turn was based on motifs from even older Germanic myths. Although a new screenplay was written by Harald G. Petersson, Ladislas Fodor and director Harald Reinl, in many respects it followed the earlier version fairly closely.

In the late 1950s, German producer Artur Brauner had wanted Fritz Lang to remake his own silent film and had already informed the press that the project would go ahead. However, in the fall of 1959, Lang energetically resisted this proposal, pointing out that it could be interpreted as Lang "not having anything new to say and being forced to fall back on successes of the past". Lang ended up making three films for Brauner that were in fact referencing his own past (The Tiger of Eschnapur, The Indian Tomb and The Thousand Eyes of Dr. Mabuse), but it took another six years for Brauner to find the right director for his Nibelungen project. Harald Reinl had been the commercially most successful director of the 1950s and 1960s in Germany. But it was the vast box office success of his three films (1963, 1964, 1965) based on Karl May's Winnetou character that convinced Brauner that Reinl was the right man for the job. Brauner wanted a disciplined worker who would respect budgets even without constant direct control by the producer, who could deal with large numbers of extras and who had experience shooting in Yugoslavia. Reinl also was fond of impressive landscape shots and, in conjunction with a symphonic music score, these were supposed to add gravitas to the story.

The 1966/1967 film was produced by Artur Brauner's CCC Filmkunst in cooperation with Belgrad-based Avala Film. Both parts were shot back-to-back between 20 April and 20 October 1966. Locations included what was then Yugoslavia (today's Serbia: Sremska Rača, Smederevo fortress and Slovenia: Postojna Cave) as well as Iceland, and Spain (Ciudad Encantada and Cuenca). Interiors were shot at Spandau Studios in Berlin-Spandau and at the Avala-Studios in Belgrad. To save on costs, the large-scale sets (the court at Worms and Etzel's Hall) were constructed in the Belgrad studios. However, this was the limit of the cooperation with Avala and the total cost of Die Nibelungen reportedly came to 8 million DM, which would have made it the most expensive post-war film in West Germany at the time.

According to a survey conducted by the Allensbach Institute prior to shooting, 35% of respondents wanted to see a movie about the hero Siegfried, but he had to be blonde and played by an unknown actor. Uwe Beyer, an olympic hammer thrower (bronze medalist in 1964) was selected to play Siegfried. He had no prior acting experience and was dubbed by Thomas Danneberg in postproduction.

== Release ==
Siegfried von Xanten premiered on 13 December 1966 at Mathäser-Filmpalast in Munich. Kriemhilds Rache followed on 16 February 1967. Both were released by Constantin Film. In 1976, the film was re-released as a single film of 110 minutes length, also titled Die Nibelungen. It was released again in 1982 under the title Das Schwert der Nibelungen.

== Reception ==
The films were very successful commercially. Siegfried von Xanten was awarded the Goldene Leinwand in 1967 for more than 3 million tickets sold within 18 months in West Germany. Critics were unimpressed, however, and their response has been summarised as "withering". Der Spiegel called the first part "childish hero-cinema" and part 2 "a simple, high-body-count spectacle". The Lexikon des internationalen Films found "familiar motifs from the Nibelungenlied as material for a naive-elaborate, at times comical, adventure series in picture-book style". The re-cut version of 1976 was considered even worse than the original.
