= Die Nibelungen =

1924 two-part film directed by Fritz Lang

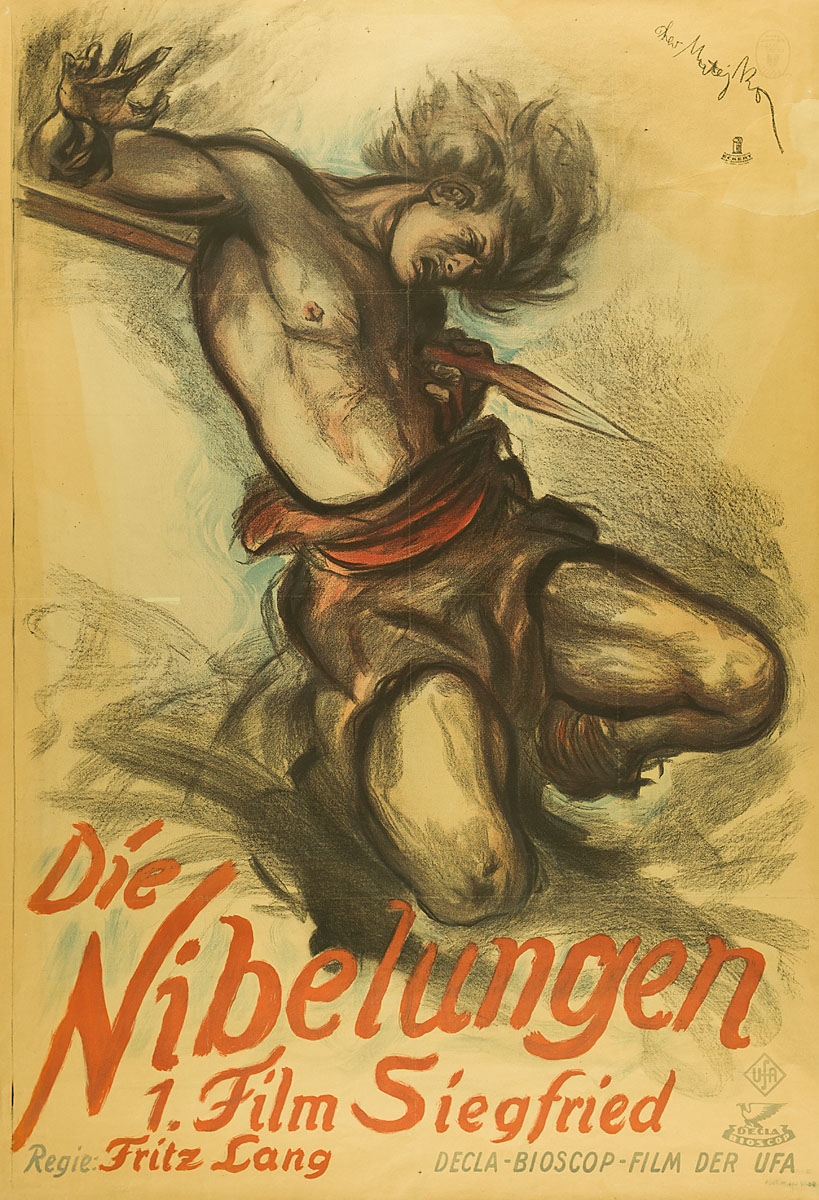
- Original 1924 theatrical film poster
- Directed by: Fritz Lang
- Screenplay by: Fritz Lang; Thea von Harbou
- Based on: Nibelungenlied
- Produced by: Erich Pommer
- Starring: Paul Richter; Margarete Schön; Hanna Ralph; Bernhard Goetzke; Theodor Loos; Rudolf Klein-Rogge; Rudolf Rittner; Hans Adalbert Schlettow; Georg August Koch; Georg John; Gertrud Arnold; Hans Carl Müller; Erwin Biswanger; Fritz Alberti; Annie Röttgen
- Cinematography: Carl Hoffmann; Günther Rittau; Walter Ruttmann
- Music by: Gottfried Huppertz
- Production company: Decla-Bioscop
- Distributed by: UFA
- Release dates: 14 February 1924 (part 1); 26 April 1924 (part 2)
- Running time: 143 minutes (part 1); 145 minutes (part 2)
- Country: Weimar Republic
- Languages: Silent film German intertitles

Die Nibelungen ("The Nibelungs") is a two-part German series of silent fantasy films created by Austrian director Fritz Lang in 1924, consisting of Die Nibelungen: Siegfried and Die Nibelungen: Kriemhild's Revenge.

The scenarios for both films were co-written by Lang's then-wife Thea von Harbou, based upon the epic poem Nibelungenlied written around AD 1200. Die Nibelungen received its UK premiere at the Royal Albert Hall in London, where it played for 40 performances between 29 April and 20 June 1924. Siegfried was released in the United States on 23 August 1925, premiering at the Century Theatre in New York City in the short-lived Phonofilm sound-on-film process. Kriemhild's Revenge was released in the U.S. in 1928.

== Plot summary ==
=== Die Nibelungen: Siegfried ===
Die Nibelungen: Siegfried (1924)

The title character Siegfried, son of King Siegmund of Xanten, masters the art of forging a sword at the shop of Mime. Siegfried hears the tales of the kingdom of Burgundy, the kings who rule there, as well as of Kriemhild, the princess of Burgundy. Siegfried announces he wants to win her hand in marriage, much to the amusement of the smiths. Siegfried demands to be told the way. Mime, who is envious of Siegfried's skill as a swordsmith, claims there is a shortcut to Burgundy through the Wood of Woden, wherein dwell all kinds of dangerous creatures. Siegfried encounters a dragon, and deviates from his path to slay it. He touches its hot, yellow blood and suddenly understands the language of the birds, who instruct him to bathe in the dragon's blood in order to become invincible – except for one spot on his shoulder blade, covered by a falling lime (linden) leaf.

Soon after, the powerful Siegfried trespasses on the land of the Nibelungs and is attacked by Alberich, King of the Dwarves, who has turned himself invisible. Siegfried defeats Alberich, who offers Siegfried a net of invisibility and transformation if he spares his life, whereupon Alberich offers to make Siegfried "the richest king on earth!" [intertitle 1.14]. While Siegfried is mesmerized by the treasure and the sword Balmung, Alberich tries to defeat him, but dies in the attempt. With his dying breath, Alberich curses all inheritors of the treasure and he and his dwarves turn to stone.

Siegfried finally arrives in Burgundy in his new guise as King of twelve kingdoms. A fight breaks out between Siegfried and King Gunther and his adviser Hagen of Tronje, which is interrupted by the appearance of beautiful princess Kriemhild. Hagen asks Siegfried to aid Kriemhild's brother, King Gunther, to win the hand of Brunhild, the Queen of Iceland. The men travel to Brunhild's kingdom, where Siegfried feigns vassalage to Gunther so that he can avoid Brunhild's challenge and instead use the net's power of invisibility to help Gunther beat the powerful Queen in a threefold battle of strength. The men return to Burgundy where Gunther marries Brunhild and Siegfried weds Kriemhild.

Brunhild is not, however, completely defeated. She suspects deceit and refuses to consummate the marriage. Hagen again convinces Siegfried to help. Siegfried transforms himself into Gunther and battles Brunhild and removes her arm-ring during battle, after which she submits to his will. Siegfried leaves the real Gunther to consummate the marriage.

Kriemhild discovers Brunhild's armlet and asks Siegfried about it. Siegfried discloses the truth to Kriemhild about his role in Brunhild's defeat. When the Nibelungen treasure that Siegfried acquired from Alberich arrives at the court of Burgundy as Kriemhild's wedding gift, Brunhild becomes more suspicious about Siegfried's feigned vassalage to Gunther. Brunhild dons the Queen Mother's jewellery and proceeds to the cathedral to enter as the first person, as is her right as Queen of Burgundy. Kriemhild tries to take Brunhild's right of way and an argument erupts between the two Queens. Kriemhild betrays her husband's and brother's secret to Brunhild, who then confronts Gunther.

Brunhild demands that Siegfried must be killed, which she justifies by claiming that Siegfried stole her maidenhood [intertitle 1.94] when he struggled with her on her wedding night. Hagen von Tronje and King Gunther conspire to murder Siegfried during a hunt in the Odenwald. Hagen deceives Kriemhild into divulging Siegfried's weak spot by sewing a cross on the spot in Siegfried's tunic.

After the hunt, Hagen challenges Siegfried to a race to a nearby spring. When Siegfried is on his knees drinking, Hagen pierces him from behind with a spear.

In an evil twist of bitter revenge, Brunhild confesses that she lied about Siegfried stealing her maidenhood in order to avenge Gunther's deceit of her.

Kriemhild demands her family avenge her husband's death at the hands of Hagen, but her family is complicit in the murder, and so they protect Hagen. Kriemhild swears revenge against Hagen while Brunhild commits suicide at the foot of Siegfried's corpse, which has been laid in state in the cathedral.

A transformation sequence from Die Nibelungen: Siegfried: After Siegfried's death, Kriemhild has a vision of Siegfried's last farewell to her.

=== Die Nibelungen: Kriemhilds Rache (Kriemhild's Revenge) ===
Die Nibelungen: Kriemhild's Revenge (1924)

Kriemhild tries to win over the people of Burgundy to help her exact revenge against Hagen, to whom her brothers have sworn allegiance. Kriemhild bribes the people with money and treasure from the Nibelungen hoard. Margrave Rüdiger von Bechelaren arrives unannounced to woo Kriemhild on behalf of his King, King Etzel, who resides in the land of the Huns. Kriemhild initially declines, but ultimately she recognises the opportunity for revenge in her marriage with Etzel and in Rüdiger's allegiance to her. She forces Rüdiger to swear allegiance to her on his sword. At that very moment, news arrives that Hagen has stolen her wedding gift, the Nibelungen hoard, which Hagen has, unbeknownst to all, sunk into the Rhine river.

Kriemhild travels to Etzel's lands and accepts his hand. As a gift to Kriemhild for bearing him a son, Ortlieb, Etzel grants her a wish. Kriemhild requests Etzel to invite her family to celebrate the Midsummer Solstice with them in the Hun kingdom. In the meantime, Kriemhild bribes Etzel's Hun warriors with money and treasure to avenge her and attack Hagen.

When the Burgundians arrive, the Huns launch an attack on the Burgundian soldiers during their feast in the caves where the Huns reside. The Burgundian Knight Dankwart manages to escape the melee and warns the Burgundian kings who are feasting with Etzel and Kriemhild in Etzel's palace. Upon hearing of the treacherous attack, Hagen of Tronje murders Etzel's son, and battle breaks out. Dietrich of Bern manages to negotiate an exit from the hall for Etzel's royal entourage, which leaves the Burgundian guests imprisoned in Etzel's palace.

The remaining 45 minutes of the film consist of multiple battles in which the Huns attack the Burgundians. Kriemhild offers her family freedom if they surrender Hagen to her. They decline. Ultimately Kriemhild calls upon Rüdiger to fulfill his oath of allegiance by attacking Hagen. Rüdiger refuses, but is forced to by Etzel. At the beginning of the battle, Rüdiger is killed by Volker of Alzey after Rüdiger of Bechlarn himself smote his nearly son-in-law Giselher of Burgundy with his sword. Gerenot carries his dead brother outside the hall to show his sister what she has done with her vindictiveness. Kriemhild grieves for Giselher and begs Gerenot for a last time to surrender Hagen of Tronje to her, but he refuses again and so is killed by the Huns. In a final act of desperation, Kriemhild commands the palace be set alight.

As the flames smoulder, only Gunther and Hagen survive. Dietrich of Bern fetches the two remaining men from the palace and delivers them to Kriemhild, who demands Hagen to reveal the hiding place of the Nibelungen hoard. When Hagen states that he has sworn not to reveal the hiding place as long as one of his kings is still alive, Kriemhild commands Gunther's beheading. When Hagen reveals that no one now knows the location of the treasure apart from him and God, and that God will never tell less than he does, Kriemhild grabs Siegfried's sword from Hagen and cuts him down. Infuriated by Kriemhild's act of murder, Sword Master Hildebrandt stabs Kriemhild from behind.

Etzel's final words are that Kriemhild should be taken back home to her dead husband, Siegfried, because she never belonged to any other man [intertitle 2.159].

== Cast ==
- Paul Richter as King Siegfried of Xanten
- Margarete Schön as Kriemhild of Burgund
- Hans Adalbert Schlettow as Hagen of Tronje
- Theodor Loos as King Gunther of Burgund
- Hanna Ralph as Queen Brunhild of Isenland
- Rudolf Klein-Rogge as King Etzel
- Bernhard Goetzke as Volker of Alzey
- Rudolf Rittner as Margrave Rüdiger of Bechlarn
- Georg John as Mime the Goldsmith / Alberich the Dwarf / Blaodel (Etzel's brother)
- Gertrud Arnold as Queen Ute of Burgund, Gunther's mother
- Hans Carl Müller as Gerenot of Burgund, Gunther's brother
- Erwin Biswanger as Giselher of Burgund, Gunther's brother
- Fritz Alberti as Dietrich of Bern
- Georg August Koch as Hildebrandt, Dietrich's aide
- Annie Röttgen as Dietlind of Bechlarn
- Frida Richard as the Runenmagd, wench at the Burgund court
- Georg Jurowski as the priest at the Burgund court

== Reception ==
The early reception of the film was greatly impacted by its ideological and nationalist content. The German film critic Heinz-Udo Brachvogel wrote in a 1924 article: "Ancient, deepest popular sentiment poured into heavy verse, fiery, primitive passion, tamed by the gliding rhythm of poetic forms, the most human thing that endured through the storms of the centuries and had to endure because it was human in the highest potency".

In 1928, Variety magazine published an article after Kriemhild's Revenge's premiere, claiming it was not a good film, and mentioned it had not been commercially successful.

In 1947, film critic Lotte Eisner wrote an article titled On the style of Fritz Lang in the Révue du Cinema magazine. There, she claimed that Germanic characters are portrayed negatively and the only sympathetic main character is the Hun King Etzel.

In 2010, film critic Leonard Maltin gave the film four out of a possible four stars, calling it "a[n] epic masterpiece". In his review he wrote, "A rich treasure trove of folklore and magic, in which Lang creates a mystical geometric universe where the characters play against vast architectural landscapes."

Die Nibelungen was among Adolf Hitler's favorite films and Heinrich Hoffmann stated that he watched it with Hitler at least twenty times. Joseph Goebbels initially criticized the film in 1924 as a "typically Jewish concoction" although "the Jew knows how to direct", but later praised it as "the pinnacle of German achievement" by 1929. Hitler and Goebbels considered making a new film adaption with sound or adding sound to the Lang film, but nothing came from either idea.

In a list of the 100 most important German films, compiled in 1994 by the Association of German Cinémathèques, Die Nibelungen was placed at #19.

== Works cited ==
- Niven, Bill (2018). Hitler and Film: The Führer's Hidden Passion. Yale University Press. ISBN 9780300200362.
