= Gjúki =

King of the Burgundians

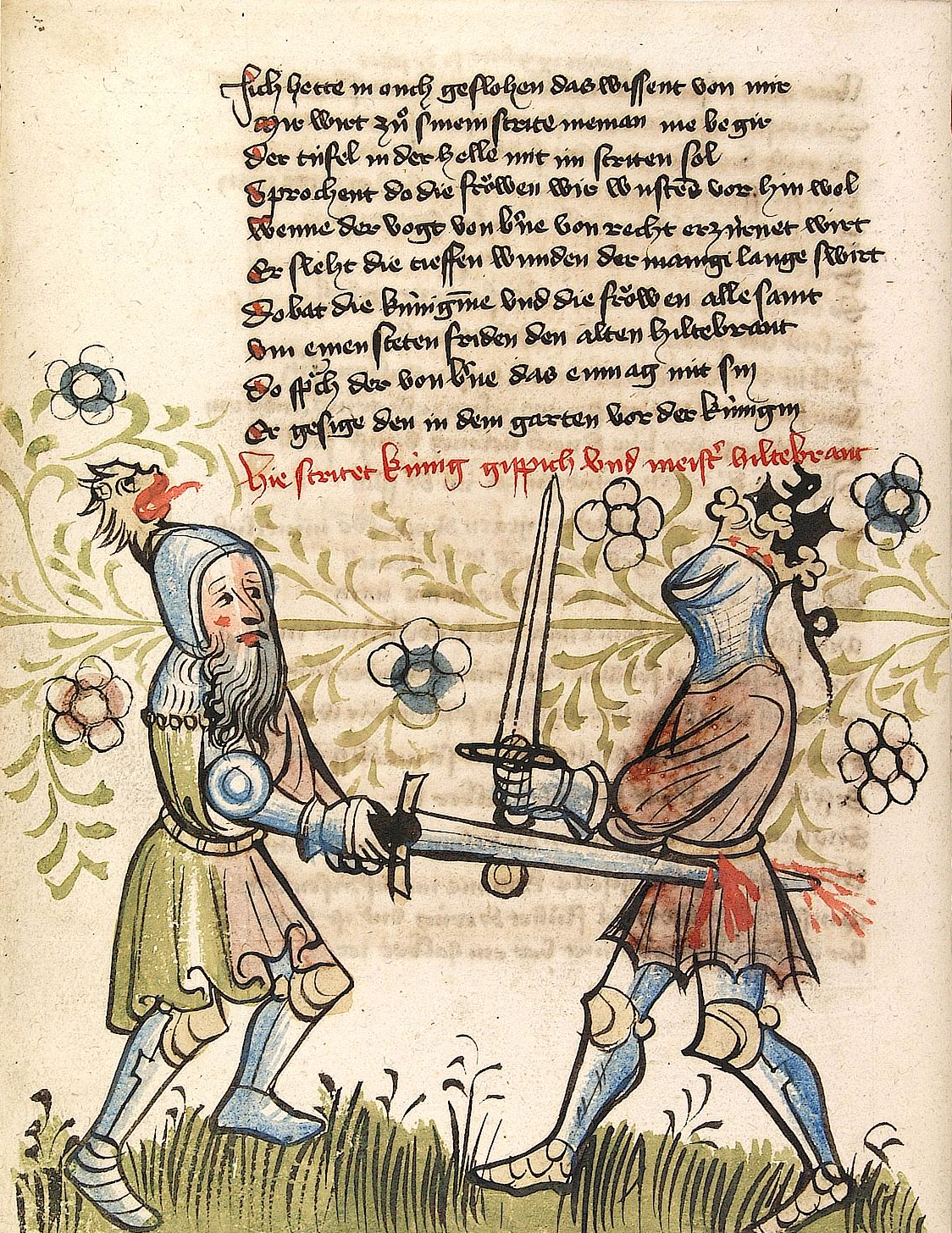
King Geppich battles Hildebrand in Rosengarten zu Worms

Gibica, better known by his later legendary names Gjúki or Gibeche, was an early king of the Burgundians. He is attested as one of the earlier kings in the prologue to the Lex Burgundionum (516 AD); otherwise, nothing is known about the historical figure. In later Germanic heroic legend, he becomes the father of other Burgundian kings and figures, including Gunther/Gunnarr and Gudrun/Kriemhild. Depending on the text, he may also be the father of Giselher, Gernot, and/or Högni. Some German sources, including the Nibelungenlied, replace the name Gibeche with another name such as Dancrat.

== Historical Gibica ==
The historical Gibica is the first in a list of old Kings of Burgundy, along with Gundomar, Gislaharius, and Gundaharius, in the Lex Burgundionum (516 AD). While Gundaharius is attested in Roman sources, no other information about Gibica or Gundomar and Gislaharius is known and the Lex does not indicate how the kings are related.

== Attestations in heroic legend ==
In Germanic heroic legend, Gibica becomes the father of the three subsequent kings.

=== Scandinavian tradition ===
He is mentioned as Gjúki in the Eddic poem Atlakviða and also, among further 14 poems, as Gjúci in the Atlamál, where he was the father of Gunnar (see Gunther). Gjúki's sister Gjaflaug is mentioned in the Guðrúnarkviða I.

In the Prose Edda, Snorri Sturluson says that Gjúki was the father of sons Gunnar and Hogni and a daughter Gudrun. Gotthorm (slayer of Sigurd) is his stepson from his wife Grimhild's previous marriage.

The Prose Edda mentions Gudny, a second daughter of Gjúki and Grimhild. In the Gudrunarkviða, this second daughter is named Gullrond.

=== Continental and Anglo-Saxon tradition ===
In the Anglo-Saxon poem Widsith (8th century), Gibica (Gifica) is mentioned as the ruler of the Burgundians. In Waltharius (9th century), Gibica appears as Gibicho, the king of Francia with a capital at Worms, who sends his son Gunther (Guntharius) as a hostage to Attila; when he dies, Gunther returns to Worms as the new Frankish king.

In the Rosengarten zu Worms (c. 1250), Gibeche (Gippich) is the father of Kriemhild and the other Burgundians; he fights in the combats at Worms and is defeated by Hildebrand, in some versions becoming a vassal to Dietrich von Bern. He also features as the father of the Burgundian kings in the Lied vom Hürnen Seyfrid (c. 1300), and the Heldenbuch-Prosa (c. 1400).

The Nibelungenlied (c. 1200) does not use the name "Gibeche" for the character, nor do the Nibelungenklage or Biterolf und Dietleib (c. 1250): these sources call the king Dancrat. (Note: The Nibelungenlied features an unrelated character by the name Gibeche as a warrior at the court of Etzel (Attila).) The Old Norse Þiðreks saga, based on German sources, names him either Aldrian or Irungr, depending on the recension, although Gunnarr (Gunther) and his brothers are still sometimes referred to as Giucungar (sons of Gjúki/Gibeche).

== See also ==
- Völsunga saga
- Tribes of Widsith
- Rosengarten zu Worms
- Nibelung

Preceded by unknown	King of Burgundy unknown	Succeeded by Gundomar I
Preceded by unknown	King of Burgundy unknown	Succeeded by Giselher
Preceded by unknown	King of Burgundy unknown	Succeeded by Gunther

== Works cited ==
- Gillespie, George T. (1973). Catalogue of Persons Named in German Heroic Literature, 700-1600: Including Named Animals and Objects and Ethnic Names. Oxford: Oxford University. ISBN 978-0-19-815718-2.
- Nedoma, Robert; Anton, Hans H. (1998). "Gibichungen". In Beck, Heinrich; Geuenich, Dieter; Steuer, Heiko (eds.). Reallexikon der Germanischen Altertumskunde. Vol. 12. New York/Berlin: de Gruyter. pp. 66–69. ISBN 978-3-11-016227-1.
