= Grimhild =

Sorceress in Norse mythology

In Norse mythology, Grimhild or Grímhildr ("masked battle") was a beautiful but evil sorceress who was married to king Gjúki of Burgundy in the Völsunga saga where she is the mother of three sons, Gunnar, Hǫgni and Guthormr, and a daughter, Gudrun. Other, similar characters of that name also appear in Illuga saga Gríðarfóstr and in Gríms saga loðinkinna.

== Völsunga saga ==
In the Völsunga saga, Queen Grimhild gave Sigurðr a magic potion that made him forget that he ever married his wife Brynhildr, so that he would marry Gudrun, her daughter, while Brynhildr would marry her son Gunnar. However, Brynhildr refused to marry Gunnar, as she would only marry a man who could cross the ring of flames she put up around herself. So Grímhildr talked Sigurðr into helping Gunnar marry Brynhildr. Since Sigurðr was the only one who could cross the flames, he and Gunnar switched bodies, so Gunnar's body could cross the flames. Brynhildr then married Gunnar, because she made a promise. When Brynhildr learned that Sigurðr had betrayed her with Gudrun, not knowing he had been bewitched into doing so by Grímhild, she was out to get revenge. She ended up killing Sigurðr and herself by the end of the saga. Grímhild then made Gudrun marry Brynhildr's brother Atli. Gudrun did not want to marry him because she knew he would end up killing her brothers. This is the last mention of Grímhild in the Völsunga saga. It is probable that, in the original myth, the ring's curse also brought misfortune and even death upon Grímhild herself.

== Illuga saga Gríðarfóstra and Gríms saga loðinkinna ==
The name of Grímhild[r] was also given to another beautiful and evil sorceress who married king Áli of Alfheim (modern Bohuslän) in Illuga saga Gríðarfóstra. She had seven daughters who too became terrible witches, while King Áli had a daughter before he married Grímhild, named Signý. Signý had a daughter with a king she had married but he died in battle, so she returned home to her father, with her daughter. Grímhild poisoned the king to have a younger man, and then had ruled the kingdom in such an evil manner that it was laid waste. She then banned Signý and Hild, her daughter, from the kingdom and put a curse on them, that Signy would turn into a troll woman named Grid and they would have to live in a cave. Every man that came would fall in love with Hild, and then Signý/Grid would have to kill them, until one man is not afraid. In turn, Hildr put a counter-curse on Grímhild, that she would stand over a fire between her legs, burning her from below while her upper parts would freeze, and into this fire Grímhild would drop once their own curse was broken. Grímhild attempted to reason with Hild, as she would rather that neither of their curses hold, but to no avail as Hildr desired revenge. Eleven years and sixteen men later, a young Dane named Illugi broke Grímhild's curse by defeating and burning all of her daughters, thus also causing her to die in the fire at last.

In Gríms saga loðinkinna, Grímhild was an evil princess who became the wife of Harald, the North Norwegian lord of the Oslofjjord, and put a curse on her stepdaughter Lofthaena to turn her into an ugly troll. Lofthaena was rescued by a man who loved her, the saga's hero Grím, who than had Grímhild punished by having a sack put over head and being stoned to death.

== Bibliography ==
- Byock, Jesse L. The Saga of the Volsungs: the Norse Epic of Sigurd the Dragon Slayer. Berkeley, CA: University of California, 1990, ISBN 978-0140447385
