= Gernet =

Gernet, spelling variant: Gerneth is a surname associated with the Baltic German noble Gernet family of the Russian Empire.

As a German surname, it is derived from the German given name Gernoth. Notable people with the surname include:

- Gustav Gerneth (1905–2019), German supercentenarian (officially unverified claim)
- Jacques Gernet (1921–2018), French sinologist
- Karl August von Gernet (1819—1892), Russian statesman and amateur biologist
- Louis Gernet (1882–1962), French philologist and sociologist
- Marie Gernet, German mathematician
- Mikhail Gernet (1874–1953), Soviet criminologist and legal historian
- Nadeschda Gernet (1877–1943), Russian mathematician and academic

== See also ==
- Gernot
