= Snake pit =

Places of horror and torture with snakes

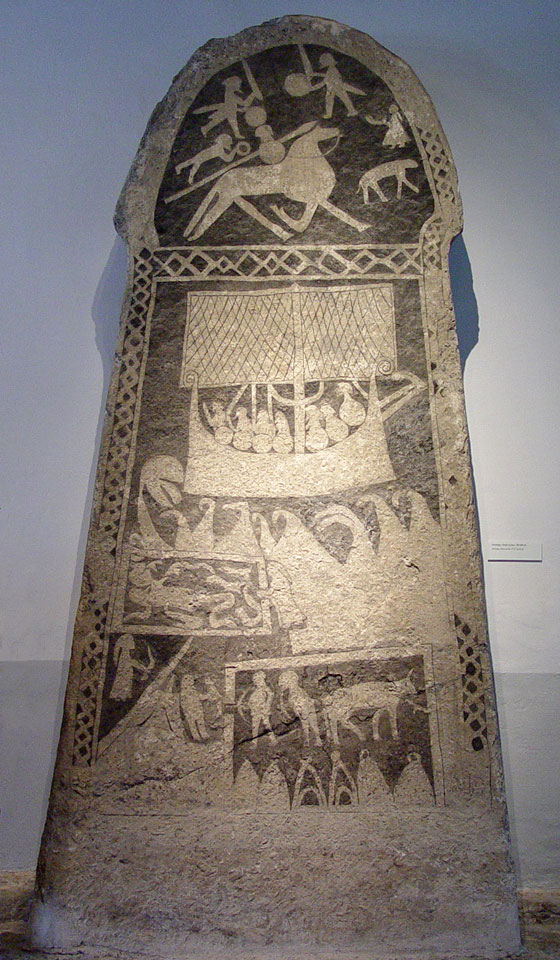
An image stone on Gotland, Sweden, with imagery from the tradition of the Völsunga saga and Nibelungenlied. Note the slain Sigurd with Andvarinaut on the top of the stone, and a lady who puts snakes into a snake pit. This particular execution is described in Atlakviða and Oddrúnargrátr, and the murdered man is Gunnarr, the King of Burgundy.

A snake pit is, in a literal sense, a hole filled with snakes. In idiomatic speech, "snake pits" are places of horror, torture and death in European legends and fairy tales. The Viking warlord Ragnar Lodbrok is said to have been thrown into a snake pit and died there, after his army had been defeated in battle by King Aelle II of Northumbria. An older legend recorded in Atlakviða and Oddrúnargrátr tells that Attila the Hun murdered Gunnarr, the King of Burgundy, in a snake pit. In a medieval German poem, Dietrich von Bern is thrown into a snake pit by the giant Sigenot – he is protected by a magical jewel that had been given to him earlier by a dwarf.

== See also ==
- Narcisse Snake Pits
