= Marie Gernet =

German mathematician

Marie Gernet (1 October 1865 – 1924) was a German mathematician who in 1895 became the second woman to obtain a doctorate at Heidelberg University. The first was Käthe Windscheid, who earned a doctorate for her work on English pastoral poetry in the previous year. Gernet was also the first native German woman to earn a doctorate in mathematics, 13 years earlier than Emmy Noether. She was the only German among the first eight women to earn a mathematics Ph.D. in Germany.

== Education ==
Gernet was born in Ettlingen; her father was an army surgeon. She earned a teaching qualification in 1883, and continued to study mathematics privately. In 1888, the Karlsruhe Großherzogliche Technische Hochschule accepted her as a special student, and she studied science there until 1891. In that year, both she and Ruth Gentry applied for graduate study at Heidelberg, but were rejected. The mathematics and science faculty of the university proposed a rule change to allow women to take individual study programs, but the university senate again rejected this change. However, the Baden Ministry of Education overruled the senate and approved the change, allowing Gernet to study at Heidelberg. There, she performed research on hyperelliptic integrals with Leo Königsberger. She failed her first oral examination for the doctorate in November 1894, but continued her studies and passed on the second attempt in July 1895.

== Later life ==
After earning her doctorate, Gernet returned to the Höhere Töchterschule in Karlsruhe, where she had studied as a girl. It soon became upgraded to a gymnasium, and continues to exist (rebuilt after World War II, and co-educational since 1973) as the Lessing-Gymnasium Karlsruhe. She remained there as a teacher and academic administrator until her retirement.

== Works ==
- Gernet, Marie (1895). Über Reduktion hyperelliptischer Integrale. Inaugural-Dissertation. Ruprecht-Karls-Universität zu Heidelberg.
