= Theodor Kipp =

German jurist (1862–1931)

Louis Theodor Kipp
- Born: 7 March 1862; Erlangen, Kingdom of Bavaria
- Died: 2 April 1931 (aged 69); Ospedaletti, Italy
- Occupation: Jurist

Louis Theodor Kipp (7 March 1862 – 2 April 1931) was a German jurist who is perhaps best known for his theory of "double nullity", under which a null contract can be challenged in some circumstances. He also made important contributions to family law and inheritance law.

== Life ==
Theodor Kipp was born in 1862. He studied law at the University of Göttingen with Rudolf von Jhering and at the Leipzig University with Bernhard Windscheid. He earned his doctorate in 1883, was admitted as a lawyer in Leipzig in 1887, and obtained a position as an associate professor at the University of Halle. In 1889 he was appointed professor of Roman and civil law at the University of Kiel, and in 1893 became professor of Roman and civil law at the University of Erlangen. From 1899 to 1900 he was rector of the Friedrich-Alexander-Universität Erlangen-Nürnberg. He edited the Bürgerliches Gesetzbuch (Civil Code) before it came into force in 1900.

From 1901 Kipp taught at the University of Berlin. In 1914 he replaced the physicist Max Planck as rector of the university. In 1914 Kipp was one of the signatories to the letter "To the Civilized World" signed by 93 German professors, known as the Manifesto of the Ninety-Three, in which the signatories disclaimed responsibility by Germany for starting World War I (1914–18), denied improper action by Germany in invading Belgium, and denied violation of international law. Kipp was rector of the University of Berlin until 1915. He was chairman of the Berlin Law Society from 1929 to 1931. Theodor Kipp died at Ospedaletti on the Italian Riviera on 2 April 1931. (Note: Some sources give Kipp's date of death as 18 August 1931.)

== Work ==
Kipp published a history of the sources of Roman law in 1896, which ran into several editions. He edited the 8th and 9th editions of Bernhard Windscheid's textbook on the Law of Pandects (Pandektenrecht). Kipp is best known for his theory of "double nullity", where a contract that is void for some reason could still be challenged. This was only gradually accepted, but later came to be used in many areas, ranging from labor law to consumer law. He wrote several monographs on legal history and civil law, and made important contributions to family law (1912) and inheritance law (1911).

== Publications ==
Kipp's publications include:

- Kipp, Louis Theodor (1887). Die Litisdenuntiation als Prozeßeinleitungsform im römischen Civilprozeß (in German). Leipzig: Breitkopf & Härtel.
- Kipp, Louis Theodor (1888). "Erörterungen zur Geschichte des römischen Civilprocesses und des interdictum quorum bonorum". Festgabe zu Bernhard Windscheids fünfzigjährigem Doctorjubiläum (in German). Halle (Saale): Niemeyer. pp. 65–122.
- Kipp, Louis Theodor (1896). Quellenkunde des römischen Rechts (in German). Leipzig.
- Kipp, Louis Theodor (1903). Weitere Auflagen: Geschichte der Quellen des römischen Rechts (in German). Leipzig.
- Kipp, Louis Theodor (1899). Der Parteiwille unter der Herrschaft des deutschen Bürgerlichen Gesetzbuchs (in German). Erlangen: K. B. Hof- und Universitätsbuchdruckerei von Fr. Junge.
- Kipp, Louis Theodor (1903). Rechtswahrnehmung und Reurecht. Sonderausgabe (in German). Berlin: Liebmann.
- Kipp, Louis Theodor (1908). Heinrich Dernburg (in German). Leipzig: Deichert.

== Sources ==
- "Kipp, Theodor". Treccani.
- Niedostadek, André (2011-09-03). "Tote kann man nicht umbringen - oder doch?". Legal Tribune.
- Professors of Germany (August 1919). "To the Civilized World". The North American Review. 210 (765). University of Northern Iowa: 284–287. JSTOR 25122278.
- "Theodor Kipp". Humboldt University of Berlin.
- "Theodor Kipp". Rektoratsreden im 19. und 20. Jahrhundert. Historische Kommission bei der Bayerischen Akademie der Wissenschaften.
