= Bernhard Windscheid =

German jurist (1817–1892)

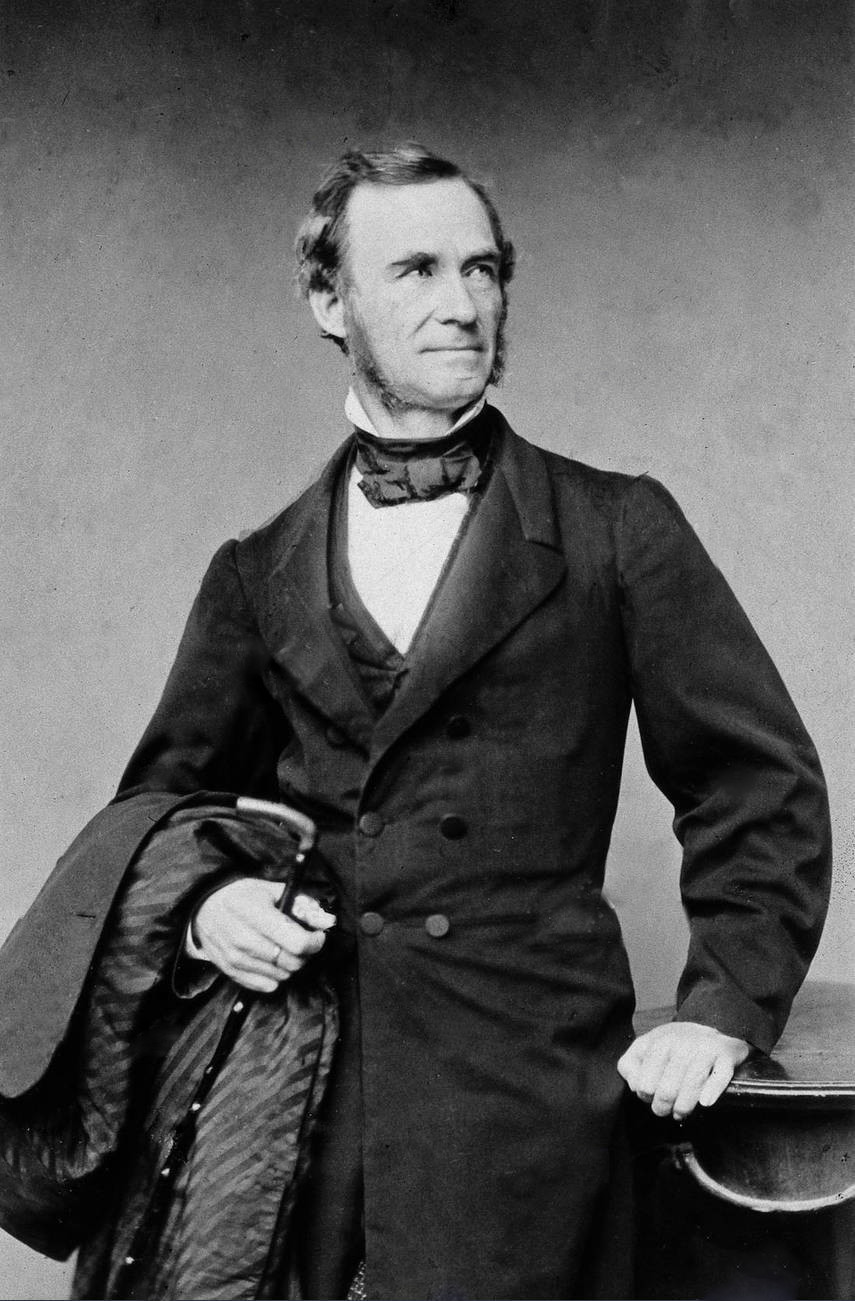
- Born: Josef Hubert Bernhard Windscheid; 26 June 1817; Düsseldorf, Prussia
- Died: 26 October 1892 (aged 75); Leipzig, German Empire
- Resting place: Neuen Johannisfriedhof
- Spouse: Charlotte Windscheid (Pochhammer)
- Children: 4 (including Käthe Windscheid)

Bernhard Joseph Hubert Windscheid (26 June 1817 – 26 October 1892) was a German jurist and a member of the pandectistic school of law thought.

He became famous with his essay on the concept of a legal action, which sparkled a debate with Theodor Muther that is said to have initiated the studies of the processal law as we know it today. Windscheid's thesis established the modern German law concept of Anspruch (roughly, a legally enforceable claim), distinguishing it from the Roman law concept of actio.

His principal work was his Lehrbuch des Pandektenrechts, and this was the main source of inspiration for the German Civil Code – the BGB. Between 1873 and 1883, Windscheid was part of the commission in charge of the drafting of the German Civil Code.

Additionally, Windscheid worked as a teacher at several universities in Germany and Switzerland, including Basel, Greifswald, München, Heidelberg, and Leipzig.

== Family ==
Bernhard Windscheid married the artist Auguste Eleanore Charlotte "Lotte" Pochhammer (1830–1918) on 4 November 1858. Four recorded children resulted from this marriage. The eldest, Käthe Windscheid (1859–1943) achieved prominence as a women's rights activist and as a pioneer of women's education. Franz Windscheid (1862–1910) was also something of a pioneer in his chosen field: he was a neurologist. The younger two children, Charlotte and Margarete, were twins.

== Published works ==
A full bibliography of Windscheid is provided by Felix Klein. His major works include:

- Windscheid, Bernhard (1847). Zur Lehre des Code Napoleon von der Ungültigkeit der Rechtsgeschäfte (in German). Düsseldorf: Verlag von Julius Buddeus.
- —— (1850). Die Lehre des römischen Rechts von der Voraussetzung (in German). Düsseldorf: Verlagsbuchhandlung von Julius Buddeus.
- —— (1856). Die Actio des römischen Civilrechts vom Standpunkte des heutigen Rechts (in German). Düsseldorf: Verlagshandlung von Julius Buddeus.
- —— (1857). Die Actio: Abwehr gegen Dr. Theodor Muther (in German). Düsseldorf: Verlagshandlung von Julius Buddeus.
- —— (1878). Zwei Fragen aus der Lehre von der Verpflichtung wegen ungerechtfertigter Bereicherung (in German). Leipzig: Verlag von Alexander Edelmann.
- —— (1862). Lehrbuch des Pandektenrechts (in German). Vol. I (1 ed.). Düsseldorf: Verlagsbuchhandlung von Julius Buddeus.
- —— (1865). Lehrbuch des Pandektenrechts (in German). Vol. II, 1 (1 ed.). Düsseldorf: Verlagsbuchhandlung von Julius Buddeus.
- —— (1866). Lehrbuch des Pandektenrechts (in German). Vol. II, 2 (1 ed.). Düsseldorf: Verlagsbuchhandlung von Julius Buddeus.
- —— (1870). Lehrbuch des Pandektenrechts (in German). Vol. III (1 ed.). Düsseldorf: Verlagsbuchhandlung von Julius Buddeus.
  - 3. ed., Düsseldorf 1870. Vol. I, Vol. II and Vol. III (in German).
  - 5. ed., Stuttgart 1879. Vol. I, Vol. II and Vol. III (in German).
  - 6. ed., Frankfurt 1887. Vol. I, Vol. II and Vol. III (in German).
  - 9. ed., Leipzig, 1906, ed. by Theodor Kipp, is the edition usually cited.
- —— (1904). Oertmann, Paul (ed.). Gesammelte Reden und Abhandlungen (in German). Duncker & Humblot.
