= Rüdiger von Bechelaren =

German mythological hero

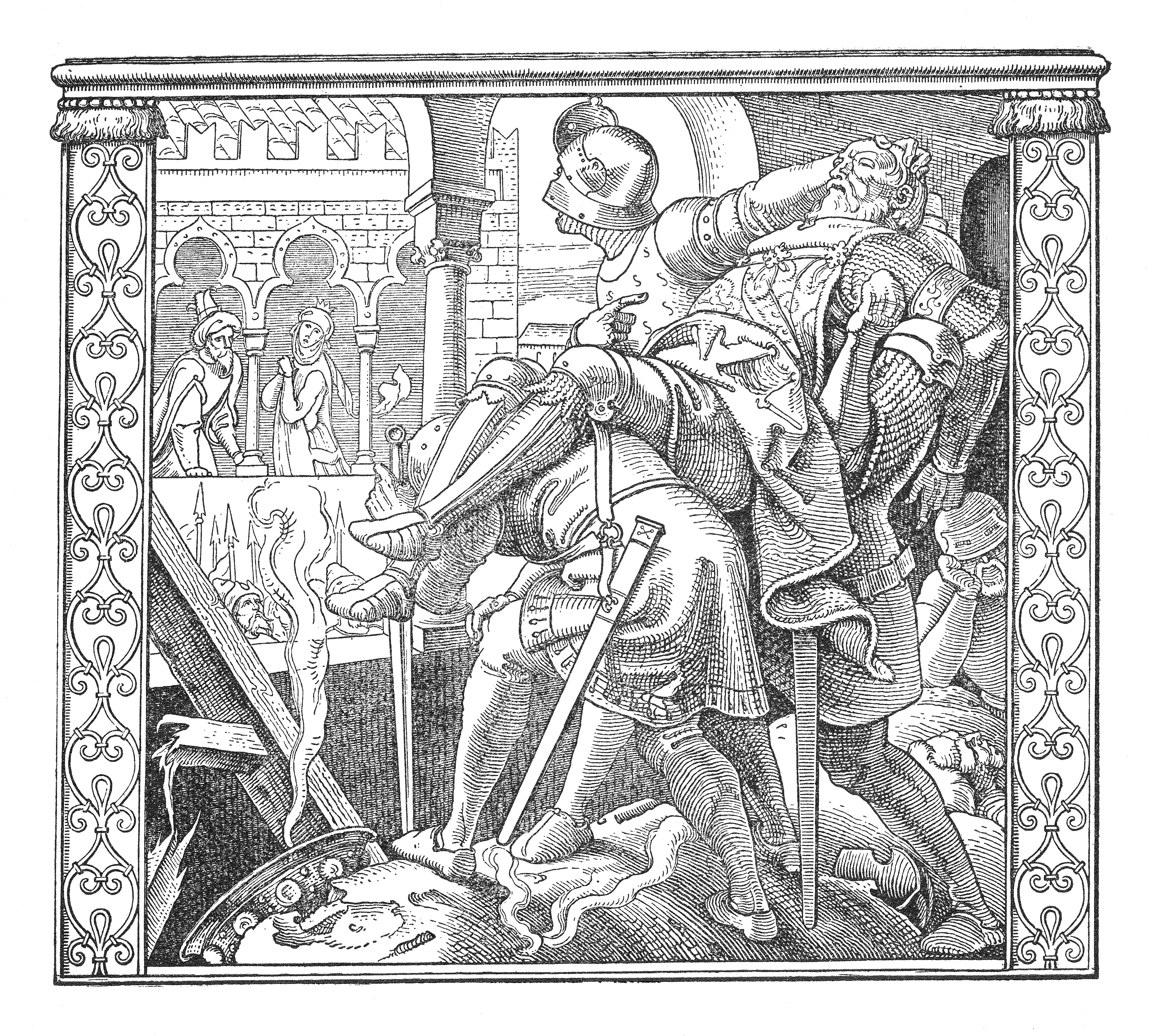
Wie Kriemhilden der Leichnam Rüdigers gezeigt wird ("Kriemhild is shown Rüdiger's body"), engraving by G. Metzger after a drawing by Alfred Rethel, 1840/1841

Rüdiger von Bechelaren is a legendary hero of German mythology immortalised in the Nibelungenlied saga. Serving as the Austrian Margrave of Pöchlarn and a member of Etzel's court, he becomes conflicted after swearing oaths to uphold two factions that ultimately go to war against each other.

== Character ==
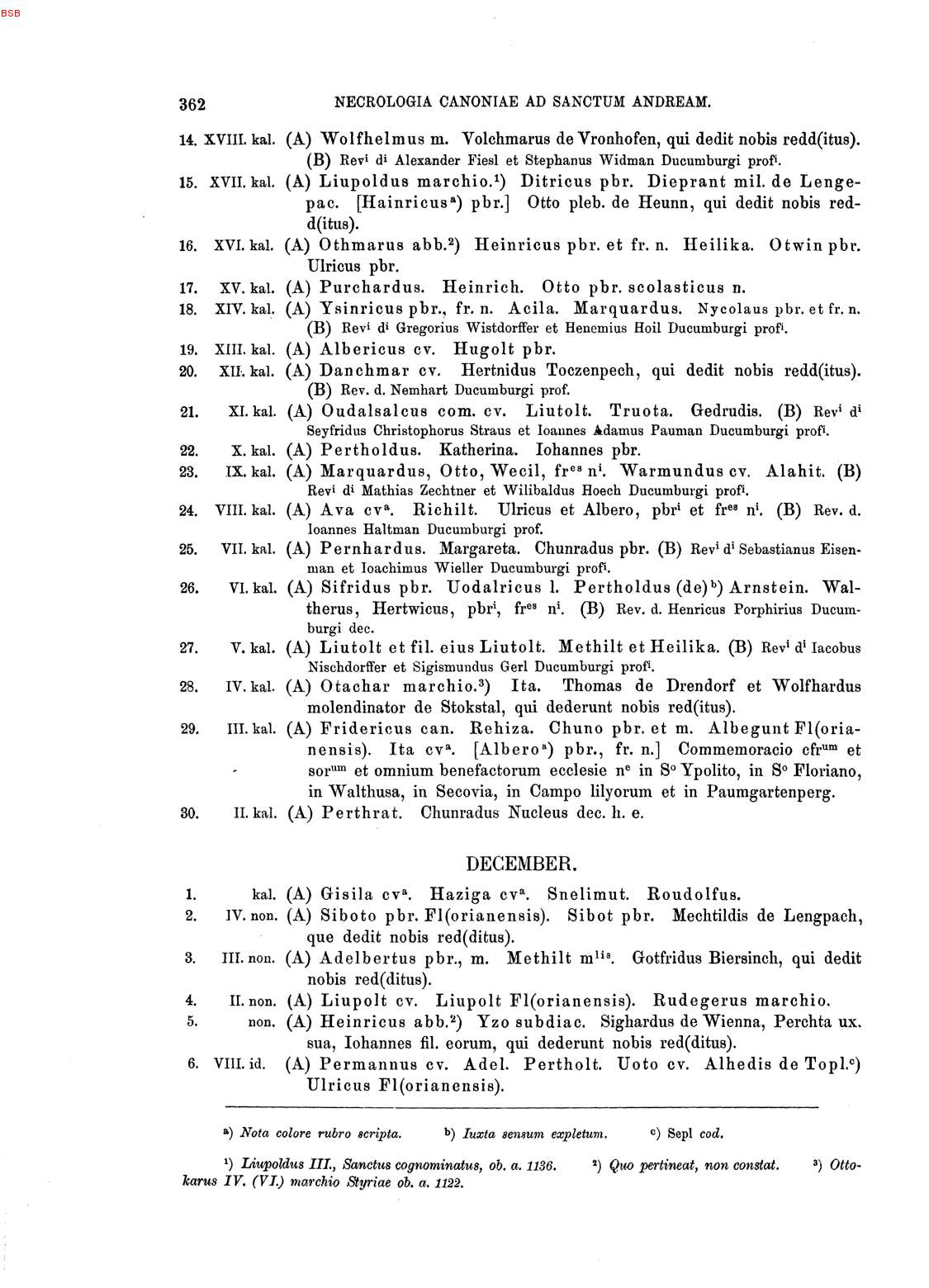
Death log containing the entry for "Rudegerus marchio", i.e. Rüdiger von Bechelaren.

"Much has been written about the extraordinary scene in the closing stages of Das Nibelungenlied when Hagen, his own shield - a gift from Rudiger's wife - shattered, asks Rudiger to give him his shield: Rüdiger is about to enter a battle to the death as one of Hagen's opponents, but he nonetheless complies with the request."

— The Germanic Review, "Hagen's Shield Request", 1996."

Rüdiger is noted for his hospitality and kindness throughout the story, and offers his daughter's hand in marriage to Giselher of Burgundy. While escorting the Burgundian envoy to Kriemhilde, he swears his absolute protection to them. However Kriemhilde takes offence at the actions of Hagen and demands Rüdiger assist her in warring against him. Caught between the conflicting loyalties, Rüdiger is asked by Hagen in the middle of the ensuing battle to fulfill his earlier vow and give up his battle-shield to Hagen who has lost his own, despite fighting on the opposite side. Rüdiger complies, and is then killed by Gernot who is wielding a sword that Rudiger had likewise gifted him.

== History ==
Like many legendary figures, there are only traces that can be connected in history. In the necrology of the former canon of St. Andrä an der Traisen on December 4, 1203, there is an entry for a certain "Rudegerus marchio", or "Markgrave Rüdiger". As mythological figures were never added to death logs, it is assumed that this is evidence that Rüdiger von Bechelaren is indeed an historical person.
