= Käthe Windscheid =

Dr. Käthe Windscheid
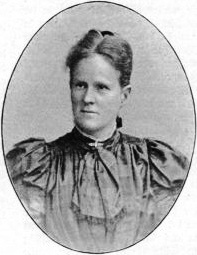
- 1899
- Born: Katharina Charlotte Friederike Auguste Windscheid; 28 August 1859; Munich, Kingdom of Bavaria
- Died: 11 March 1943 (aged 83); Leipzig, Gau Sachsen, Germany
- Education: University of London; Heidelberg University
- Occupations: Women's rights activist Educator; Education pioneer
- Parent(s): Bernhard Windscheid (1817-1892); Charlotte Pochhammer (1830-1918)

Katharina "Käthe" Windscheid (28 August 1859 – 11 March 1943) was a German women's rights activist and a pioneer of women's education. In 1895 she became the first woman in Germany to receive a doctorate for an academic dissertation.

== Life ==
=== Early life and education ===
Katharina Charlotte Friederike Auguste Windscheid was born in Munich, where her father, the distinguished jurist Bernhard Windscheid, taught at the Ludwig-Maximilians-Universität München between 1858 and 1871. Her parents had married on 4 November 1858. Her mother was the artist Auguste Eleanore Charlotte "Lotte" Pochhammer (1830–1918). There were three younger siblings, including Franz Winscheid (1862–1910) who would also become something of a pioneer in his chosen field: he was a neurologist.

Katharina Windscheid attended the Höhere Mädchenschule in Munich. Girls' secondary schools were still unusual in Germany; but when the family moved to Heidelberg (in 1871) and then to Leipzig (in 1874) (due to her father's work commitments) she pursued her education at equivalent schools in those cities. By 1882, she had stayed in London and Geneva (and/or, according to some sources, in France) in order to deepen her knowledge of English and French. By 1880, her father was 63, and although he was still a professor at Leipzig University, the family – including Katharina – lived in Berlin between 1880 and 1883. Rail links from Berlin to Saxony had been significantly upgraded during the 1870s. Käthe attended teaching seminars attached to Berlin's "Victoria-Lyzeum" (secondary school), and in 1882, she qualified as a language teacher for English and French. When the family returned to Leipzig in 1883 she worked for several months as a language teacher at the Höhere Mädchenschule which she had attended as a child.

Thanks to the efforts of educationalists from Britain such as Georgina Archer and the known enthusiasm for modern ideas of the Kaiser's English-born daughter-in-law, Victoria, England was known (correctly) in liberal circles as a relatively progressive country in respect of women's education. In 1885 Käthe Windscheid returned to London to study English literature at the University of London, which during the 1870s had become the first in England to accept women for degree courses. In 1887 she emerged from the teachers' training college (Lehrerinnenseminar) in Dresden – at that time the only such institution for women in the whole of Saxony – with a full German teaching qualification. In parallel with her studies she had already, since Easter 1886, been working as a teacher at the prestigious Teichmann'schen Teaching and Education Academy at its daughter school in Leipzig. She had also started to attend philology lectures as a Gasthörerin (literally, "(female) guest listener") at Leipzig University.

=== Education for women ===
Around this time Windscheid became a member of the German Women's Association (Allgemeiner Deutscher Frauenverein, or ADF). Described in one source as "the oldest German women's rights organisation", the ADF had been founded in Leipzig by Louise Otto-Peters and Auguste Schmidt in 1865. Its major objectives included access for women to higher education and to gainful employment. Other leading ADF members included educators such as Henriette Goldschmidt, Josefine Friederici and Johanna Brandstetter. In 1888 Käthe Windscheid was a co-founder of the Leipziger Lehrerinnen-Verein ("Leipzig female teachers' association"). She remained an active member of its governing committee until 1902, and stayed on as an honorary member after that. In 1892 she was elected to the national executive of the ADF. That same year she was a founding member of the Frauengewerbe-Verein (loosely, "women's vocational union") which was established at the instigation of the Leipziger Lehrerinnen-Verein. In 1902 she teamed up with her mother to create the Leipziger Verein der Kinderfreunde (Kinderschutz) e. V., which concerned itself with identifying and seeking to counteract cases of child mistreatment, moral hazard, child malnutrition and excessive use of child labour. In working with these welfare-oriented and campaigning organisations Windscheid did not restrict herself to "executive duties". She gave lectures and presentations covering a range of related topics such as care of the poor and of orphans, reading material, the women's movement and - a particular concern of Windscheid's: girls' education, as reported in the Neue Bahn, the ADF's house publication, available in the Louise-Otto-Peters-Archiv in Leipzig.

While campaigning for (among other issues) better provision of education for women, Käthe Windscheid also continued to invest time and talent in her own education. Probably it was her father's intervention with his friend, Frederick I, Grand Duke of Baden, that enabled Windscheid to study for a doctorate at Heidelberg University. She was awarded the certificate in 1895 for her dissertation submitted the previous year, entitled Die englische Hirtendichtung von 1579–1625 (loosely, "English Pastoral Poetry 1579–1625"). Until the early 20th century women in Germany were generally ineligible for university-level studies. Women with appropriate language skills and enough money and determination were obliged to go abroad for their higher education, as Käthe Windscheid had done. Saxony was more progressive than some parts of Germany, however, in that as far back as 1870, women were able to attend university lectures as "guest listeners", with the permission of the professors. Windscheid had used that facility at Leipzig University between 1890 and 1894, but there had been no possibility of obtaining any sort of academic degree afterwards.

=== Abitur ===
Thus in the 19th century there were no arrangements for girls wishing to study for the Abitur – the school final exams that were the gateway to a university education. Since its creation in 1865 the ADF had submitted a series of petitions demanding better school provision for girls, equal standards for female and male trainee teachers and admission of women to universities. Meanwhile, using a private foundation dedicated to provision of university-level studies and a girls' secondary school, the ADF was able, towards the end of the 19th century, to provide bursaries for a small number of women to attend universities abroad. A further milestone was reached at Easter 1894 when the first secondary school courses designed to prepare girls for the Abitur were introduced. This initiative had originated in Berlin, where Helene Lange had started providing equivalent courses (Realkurse) for secondary school girls in 1889: these prepared girls for the Swiss Abitur, as the opening up of German universities to women still seemed unthinkable, and at most Swiss universities the first language was a version of German. A further step forward was the establishment in 1893 of the first private girls' Gymnasium (pre-university secondary school) in Karlsruhe, although the school still operated under male leadership.

Course fees for female students undertaking the ADF pre-university courses – set, in 1897, at 240 marks annually – were funded partly from the small income of the private foundation and partly from private donations. It was only in 1901 that the state added a contribution. In Leipzig the ADF courses were organised and headed up by Dr Käthe Windscheid. She started out in the first year with ten students, whom she taught in her mother's apartment in the city. Due to demand, the courses had to be moved to larger premises in 1895. As numbers increased further, they moved again in 1900 and 1905. Windscheid enthused her pupils with her scholarship and with a friendly and at times less formal approach. There were "literary tea-parties" and other shared celebrations as well as school theatre visits. Windscheid gave many of the lessons herself. Increasingly, qualified teachers from secondary schools were also recruited to cover a remarkably broad curriculum that included German, French, English, History, Latin, Greek, Religion, Mathematics, Botany and Zoology, Chemistry, Physics and Geography. "Movement games" (Bewegungsspiele) and gymnastics were also part of the programme. All the teachers employed had been awarded doctorates as part of their university education. Between 1903 and 1910 a second female teacher was employed: Dr Frida Hansmann's educational career, like Käthe Windscheid's own, reflected the limited opportunities for women at that time. Hansmann had passed her Abitur not in Germany but in Zurich, before moving on to the Eidgenössische Technische Hochschule (university), also in Zurich, for her first degree. She had then attended lectures at the University of Göttingen as a "guest listener", but the university authorities there had rejected her doctoral dissertation. For that final qualification, she had been obliged to return to Switzerland where, in 1902, she had received her doctorate in Chemistry from the University of Bern.

In 1898, the first five female students in Saxony passed their Abitur before an independent royal commission in Dresden-Neustadt. It was only in 1902 that the first cohort of students from Käthe Windscheid's institution in Leipzig were allowed to take the exams at the Petrigymnasium (boys' school), and it was only in the summer term of 1906 that Leipzig University opened its degree courses to women. 27 women enrolled that year. One of those, Hannelore Rothenburg, subsequently achieved distinction as a biographer. They all went on to receive doctorates.

=== Later years ===
The Saxony Girls' School Law was enacted in 1910, which introduced public Abitur (pre-university) courses for girls. The state authorities proposed that they should take over the by now well established ADF secondary school courses, but with the added provision that these should now operate under male leadership. Creation of the school courses by women for women had necessarily been a valued ADF tenet, and the idea that male leadership should now be superimposed on the existing structure was rejected. The courses were integrated into the programme at the Leipzig Girls' Secondary School under the leadership of a female head teacher. The ADF courses were therefore ended in 1914. Dr. Käthe Windscheid moved as a teacher to the new Number 1 Girls' Secondary School ("I. Höhere Mädchenschule") into which the former Girls' Secondary School had been incorporated.

By 1914 Dr. Käthe Windscheid had taken 197 girls through the ADF courses to the Abitur. The school director (head), Prof. Groth, joined together with the municipal schools office and pupils at the school to apply to the Saxony Culture Ministry for Dr. Käthe Windscheid to be granted the title of "professor", in recognition of her services to girls' secondary education. The application was rejected. Instead, however, in 1914 she was awarded the Order of Maria Anna 3rd class. She continued working at the school as an educator, in the first instance as a senior teacher and subsequently as a student counsellor, till 1924 when, having reached the age of 65, she retired.

Dr. Käthe Windscheid died in Leipzig on 11 March 1943.
