= Giselher of Burgundy =

King of Burgundy in German mythology

Giselher was a king of Burgundy in the Nibelungenlied, brother to kings Gunther and Gundomar I (also called Gernot). Historically, these correspond to three sons of king Gebicca, Gundomar, Gislaharius (Giselher) and Gundaharius (Gunther), who ruled the Burgundians in the 410s. His name means "pledged warrior".

In the Nibelungenlied, he is betrothed to Dietlind, the daughter of Count Rüdiger of Bechelaren. He died sometime before 436. He was likely the second son of Gebicca, not the third as is reported in the Nibelungenlied. He was succeeded by his brother Gundaharius.

Preceded by Gundomar I	King of Burgundy; 411 – ?	Succeeded by Gundaharius
