= Gunther =

Semi-legendary king of Burgundy of the early 5th century

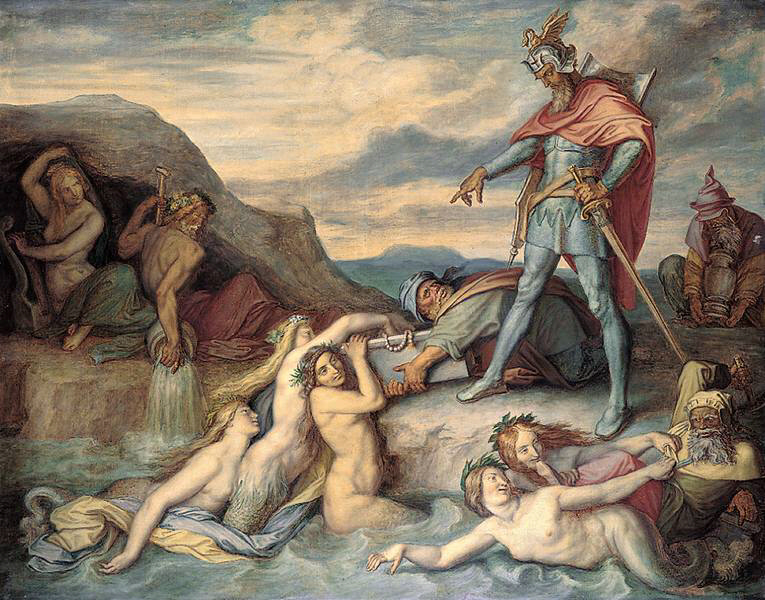
According to the Nibelungenlied (1859) by Peter von Cornelius, Gunther orders Hagen to drop the hoard into the Rhine.

Gundaharius or Gundahar or Gunther (Middle High German: Gunther), was a historical King of the Burgundians in the early 5th century. Gundahar is attested as ruling his people shortly after they crossed the Rhine into Roman Gaul. He was involved in the campaigns of the failed Roman usurper Jovinus before the latter's defeat, after which he was settled on the left bank of the Rhine as a Roman ally. In 436, Gundahar launched an attack from his kingdom on the Roman province of Belgica Prima. He was defeated by the Roman general Flavius Aetius, who destroyed Gundahar's kingdom with the help of Hunnish mercenaries the following year, resulting in Gundahar's death.

The historical Gundahar's death became the basis for a tradition in Germanic heroic legend in which the legendary Gunther met his death at the court of Attila the Hun (Etzel/Atli). The character also became attached to other legends: most notably he is associated with Siegfried/Sigurd and Brunhild, and is implicated in Sigurd's murder. He also appears as an adversary in the legend of Walter of Aquitaine. It is generally assumed that Gunther's involvement in these other legends, in which he plays a secondary or antagonistic role, is a later development. Gunther's importance in the story of the destruction of the Burgundians also waned with time.

Gunther appears as a legendary character in Latin, Middle High German, Old Norse, and Old English texts, as well as in various pictorial depictions from Scandinavia. Most significantly, he plays a role in the German Nibelungenlied, the medieval Latin Waltharius, and his counter part Gunnarr in the Old Norse Poetic Edda and Völsunga saga. He also plays an important role in Richard Wagner's operatic Ring cycle, which is based on the medieval legends of Sigurd.

== Etymology ==
The first element of Gunther's name is Proto-Germanic *gunþ-, meaning war or conflict. The second element is Proto-Germanic *-hari, meaning army.

The name of the historical Gundahar is attested in the primary sources as Latin Gundaharius or Gundicharius and Greek Γυντιάριος (Gyntiarios). Medieval Latin gives the name of the legendary figure as Guntharius, while Anglo-Saxon has Gūðhereand Middle High German has Gunther.

== Historical Gundahar ==
Gundahar is the first king of Burgundy to be historically attested. It is unclear if he ruled alone or if he may have ruled together with brothers, as occurs in the heroic tradition; the title φύλαρχος (phylarchos) given to him by Olympiodorus of Thebes may suggest he was not the sole ruler. In Prosper of Aquitaine he is identified as rex (king).

A majority of the Burgundians crossed the Rhine in 406/407, together with numerous other Germanic tribes. Their king Gundahar is first attested in 411 as cooperating with Goar, king of the Alans, to proclaim Jovinus as a new emperor in the province Germania Inferior on the lower Rhine. He is attested as being involved in Jovinus's campaigns in southern Gaul. Following Jovinus's defeat in 413, the Roman magister militum Constantius settled the Burgundians on the left bank of the Rhine as Roman foederati. Based on the later heroic tradition, many scholars identify their area of settlement as around Worms, though some scholars have argued in favor of other locations.

In the 430s, the Burgundians came under increasing pressure from the Huns; likely as a reaction to this Gundahar attacked the Roman province Belgica Prima (based around Trier) in 435. The Burgundians were defeated by the Roman general Flavius Aetius, who nevertheless confirmed Gundahar and his people's rights to their kingdom. However, the next year (436) Aetius, accompanied by Hunnish mercenaries, attacked and destroyed the Burgundian kingdom. According to Prosper of Aquitaine, Gundahar and the majority of his people found their deaths in Aetius's attack.

Aetius resettled the survivors of the destruction of the Burgundian kingdom in Savoy on the upper Rhone. The memory of Gundahar and his downfall was likely preserved by these survivors, as well as by observers from neighboring Germanic tribes.

The late fifth-/early-sixth century Lex Burgundionum, produced by the Burgundian king Gundobad at the Burgundians' new kingdom, mentions four older Burgundian kings: Gibica, Gundomar, Gislaharius, and Gundahar. It makes no mention of any familial relationship between the kings, however. In the heroic tradition, Gibica (Gibeche/Gjúki) appears as Gundahar's father, while Gundomar (Guthorm/Gernot) and Gislaharius (Giselher) appear as his brothers and co-kings.

== Anglo-Saxon traditions ==
=== Waldere ===
In the fragmentary Old English poem Waldere (c. 1000), the Old English attestation of the story of Walter of Aquitaine (see Waltharius under Continental traditions), Guðhere (Gunther) is preparing to attack Waldere (Walter). He refuses the gifts that Walther offers him to make peace and is portrayed as boastful. It appears that Guðhere wishes to take the gold that Waldere has with him.

=== Widsith ===
The narrator of the Old English poem Widsith reports that he was given a ring by Guðhere when he visited the Burgundians (Burgendas).

== Continental traditions ==
=== Waltharius ===
The Waltharius is a Latin epic that reworks the legend of Walter of Aquitaine; it is conventionally dated to around 1000, but some scholars argue that it was produced in the Carolingian period.

In Waltharius, Gunther (as Guntharius) appears as a king of the Franks with his capital at Worms. At the beginning of the poem, Gunther's father Gibeche (Gibico) has sent his vassal Hagen (Hageno) to the Huns as a hostage because Gunther is still too young. Hagen later flees back to Gibeche's kingdom. When Walter and his love Hiltgunt flee the Huns, taking much treasure, they enter into Gunther's kingdom by crossing the Rhine by Worms. They sell the ferryman fish they had brought with them in exchange for passage, and the ferryman brings these fish, which do not live in the area, to the king. Hagen tells Gunther that this must be Walter, and Gunther declares that now he can reclaim the gold that his father had paid to Attila in tribute. Although Hagen advises against it, the king sets out with some warriors to apprehend Walter and Hiltgunt. When Gunther finds the pair, he demands that Walter give him Hiltgunt and the gold. Walter refuses and kills Gunther's warriors as they attack, despite Gunther's encouragements. Finally, only Gunther and Hagen are left alive; they allow Walter to leave, then attack him from behind. Walter cuts off Gunther's leg, but Hagen saves the king's life when Walter wishes to kill him. After both Hagen and Walter have maimed each other, the fighting stops and Hiltgunt tends the warriors' wounds. The warriors then part in friendship.

The story presents a contrast to Gunther's destruction in that he is attracted by the Huns' gold rather than the other way around. Like Gunther's role in the death of Siegfried, his role in the legend of Walter places him in a negative light.

=== Nibelungenlied ===
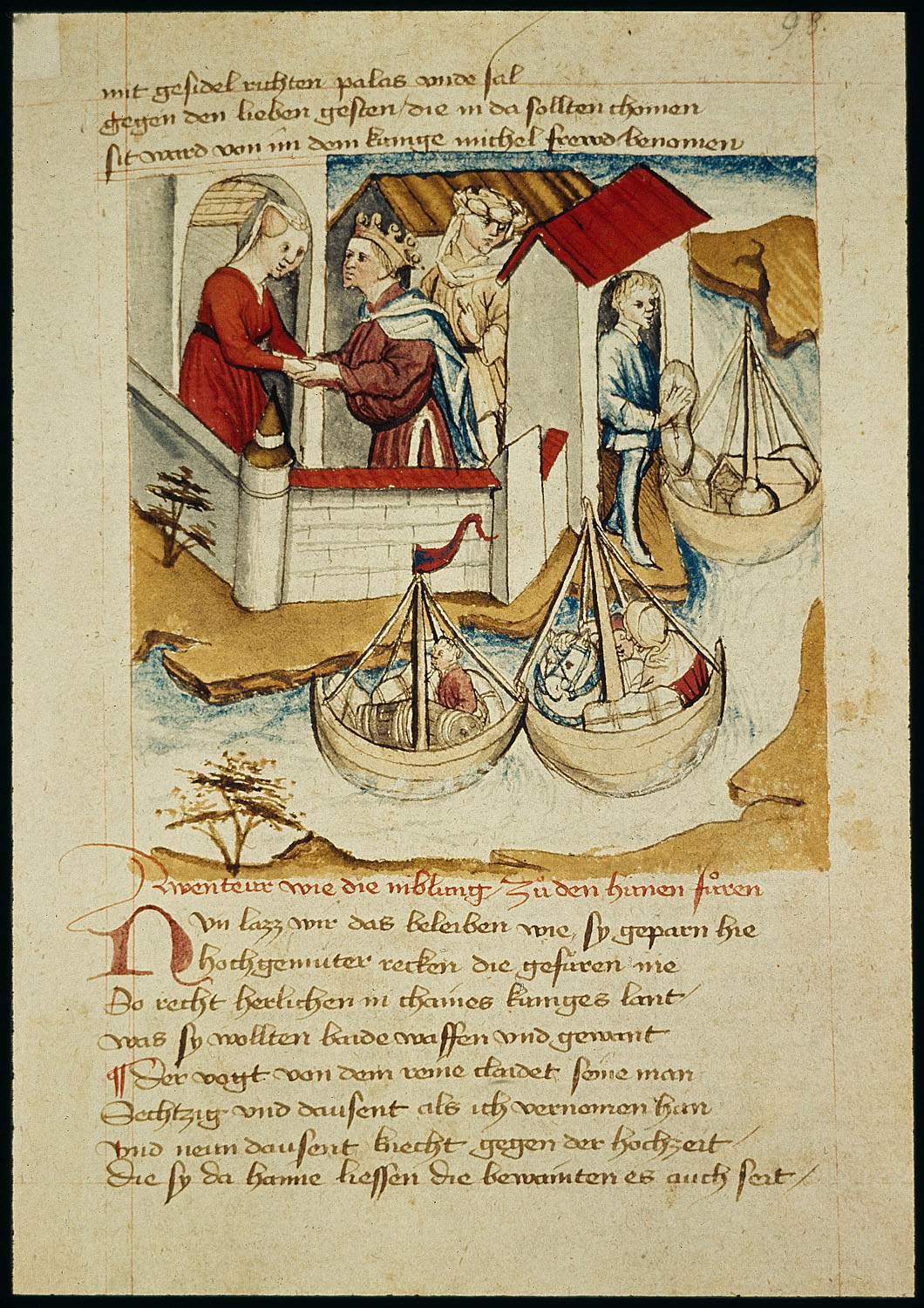
Gunther and the Burgundians prepare to leave for Etzel's court. Hundeshagenscher Kodex

Gunther's story next appears in writing in the Nibelungenlied from c. 1200. In it, Gunther is the king of the Burgundians with a capital at Worms. He is the son of King Dancrat and Queen Ute and rules together with his royal brothers Giselher and Gernot, and his sister is named Kriemhild. When Siegfried comes to Worms to woo Kriemhild, he first challenges Gunther as king before the situation is resolved peacefully. Gunther subsequently relies on Siegfried to defeat his enemies the Saxons and Danes. Eventually, Gunther offers to allow Siegfried to marry Kriemhild if Siegfried first helps him woo the queen of Iceland, Brunhild. Brunhild has set various martial and physical challenges that any suitor must accomplish, or else she will kill him. Siegfried uses his cloak of invisibility (Tarnkappe) to allow Gunther to accomplish each challenge, and Brunhild is forced to marry Gunther. She refuses, however, to sleep with Gunther on her wedding night, tying him up and hanging him from a hook. Gunther again enlists Siegfried's help, who takes Gunther's shape and overpowers Brunhild so that Gunther can then sleep with her.

Some time later, Kriemhild and Brunhild quarrel, and Kriemhild tells Brunhild that Siegfried and not Gunther took her virginity. Brunhild complains to Gunther, who causes Siegfried to publicly swear that this is not true. Brunhild and Gunther's vassal Hagen, however, are not satisfied, and convince Gunther to have Siegfried murdered while on a hunt. Hagen kills Siegfried, taking possession of his sword Balmung, and later arranges to steal the hoard of the Nibelungs that rightfully belongs to Kriemhild as Siegfried's widow. After some time, Kriemhild is persuaded to be reconciled with Gunther, but not with Hagen. After she has been married to King Etzel (Attila) of the Huns, she invites her brothers to visit, plotting revenge. Gunther accepts this invitation despite Hagen's warning, and the Burgundians trek from Worms to Etzelburg (Buda). Gunther can be said to play a secondary role to Hagen in the conclusion of the Nibelungenlied. When fighting begins, Gunther fights bravely. When only he and Hagen are left alive, Dietrich von Bern defeats and captures the two after his offers to surrender are rejected. Told by Hagen that he will only reveal the location of the hoard of the Nibelungs once Gunther is dead, Kriemhild has her brother beheaded.

=== Þiðrekssaga ===
Although the Þiðrekssaga (c. 1250) is written in Old Norse, the majority of the material is translated from German (particularly Low German) oral tales, as well as possibly some from German written sources such as the Nibelungenlied. Therefore, it is included here.

Gunnar (Gunther) is a king of the Niflungs who live in northern Germany at Niflungaland, with a capital at Verniza (Worms). He is the son of King Aldrian and Queen Oda and brother of Grimhild (Kriemhild), Gernoz (Gernot), and Gisler (Giselher), and half-brother of Högni (Hagen). In another version of the saga, his father is Irung.

Gunnar first appears when he takes part in the expedition of twelve heroes to Bertangenland organized by Thidrek (Dietrich von Bern). He loses in combat against one of King Isung's sons, but is freed once Thidrek defeats Sigurd (Siegfried). Thidrek and Sigurd then accompany Gunnar back to his court, and Sigurd marries Gunnar's sister Grimhild. Sigurd suggests that Gunnar should marry Brunhild, and Gunnar agrees. Although Brunhild is initially reluctant, saying Sigurd had promised to marry her, she eventually agrees. However, she refuses to sleep with Gunnar and overpowers him with her immense strength when he tries to. Gunnar then tells Sigurd to take Gunnar's shape and deflower Brunhild for him. This takes away Brunhild's strength; after this, Brunhild is brought back to Gunnar's court.

After some time conflict erupts between Brunhild and Grimhild over their respective statuses at court. The quarrel causes Grimhild to reveal to Brunhild that Sigurd took her virginity, not Gunnar. When Gunnar hears of this, he and Högni decide to kill Sigurd. Högni then kills Sigurd on a hunt, and Gunnar and he place the corpse in Grimhild's bed. Later, Grimhild is married to Atli (Attila), and she invites her brothers to visit her and her new husband's court at Susat (Soest). She intends to kill them, while Atli desires the hoard they had taken from Sigurd. Gunnar agrees to come despite Högni's warnings. As in the Nibelungenlied, Gunnar plays a secondary role to Högni in the action at Atli's court. Once fighting breaks out at the Hunnish court, Gunnar is taken captive. Grimhild tells Atli to throw him into a tower full of snakes, where he dies.

The author of the saga has made a number of changes to create a more or less coherent story out of the many oral and possibly written sources that he used to create the saga. The author mentions alternative Scandinavian versions of many of these same tales, and appears to have changed some details to match the stories known by his Scandinavian audience. The saga's version of the downfall of the Burgundians represents a unique mix of elements known from the Norse and continental traditions. Some elements that are closer to the Norse version may reflect genuine Low German traditions: a "snake tower" (Schlangenturm) is attested as having existed in Soest until the end of the eighteenth century.

== Scandinavian traditions and attestations ==
=== The Poetic Edda ===
The Poetic Edda, a collection of heroic and mythological Nordic poems, appears to have been compiled around 1270 in Iceland, and assembles mythological and heroic songs of various ages. As elsewhere in the Scandinavian tradition, Gunnar is the son of Gjuki and the brother of Gudrun and Högni. Depending on the poem Guthorm is either his full brother, step-brother, or half-brother. A sister Gullrönd also appears in one poem.

Generally, none of the poems in the collection is thought to be older than 900 and some appear to have been written in the thirteenth century. It is also possible that apparently old poems have been written in an archaicizing style and that apparently recent poems are reworkings of older material, so that reliable dating is impossible.

==== Grípisspá ====
In Grípisspá, a prophecy that Sigurd receives about his future life and deeds, Sigurd learns of his future marriage to Gudrun and his role taking Gunnar's place in his wooing of Brunhild, followed by his murder.

The poem is probably not very old.

==== Brot af Sigurðarkviðu ====
Brot af Sigurðarkviðu is only preserved fragmentarily: the surviving part of the poem tells the story of Sigurd's murder. The fragment opens with Högni questioning Gunnar's decision to have Sigurd murdered, believing that Brunhild's claim that Sigurd slept with her might be false. Soon after the murder occurs, Gunnar shows himself to be deeply concerned about the future, while Brunhild admits that she lied to have Sigurd killed. Gunnar plays only a supporting role in the surviving portion of the poem, with Brunhild and Gudrun being the more important characters.

==== Sigurðarkviða hin skamma ====
Sigurðarkviða hin skamma retells the story of Sigurd's life from his arrival at Gunnar's court to his murder. On account of its content, which dwells on psychological motivation, and its style, this poem is generally not thought to be very old.

Sigurd and Gunnar become friends when Sigurd comes to Gunnar's court, and Sigurd aids Gunnar in his wooing of Brunhild. Sigurd marries Gudrun, but Brunhild desires him for herself. In her jealousy, she threatens to leave Gunnar if he does not have Sigurd murdered. Gunnar and Högni decide that the death of Sigurd is not as bad as losing the queen, so they have their brother Guthorm murder him in his bed. Brunhild laughs loudly when she hears Gudrun's wailing, and Gunnar insults her and makes accusations against her when he hears her laugh. Brunhild tells him that she never wanted to marry him, but was forced to by her brother Atli. She then kills herself in spite of Gunnar's attempts to change her mind.

==== Dráp Niflunga ====
The Dráp Niflunga is a short prose section connecting the death of Sigurd to the following poems about the Burgundians (Niflungs) and Atli (Attila). Atli, who is Brunhild's brother, blames Gunnar for Brunhild's death, and in order to placate him Gunnar marries Gudrun to Atli. Gunnar desires to marry Brunhild and Atli's sister Oddrun, but Atli refuses, so Gunnar and Oddrun become lovers. Some time later, Atli invites Gunnar and Högni to visit him, and they go despite a warning from Gudrun. Gunnar and Högni are taken prisoner, and Gunnar is thrown into a snake pit: he puts the snakes to sleep with his harp, but in the end one bites him in the liver, and he dies.

==== Oddrúnargrátr ====
In Oddrúnargrátr, Atli's sister Oddrun narrates the story of her love for Gunnar. She tells how Atli refused to marry her to Gunnar after her sister Brunhild's death. She and Gunnar nevertheless begin an affair, sleeping together until one day they are discovered. In anger, Atli then murders Gunnar and Högni, throwing Gunnar into a snake pit. Oddrun says that she tries to help Gunnar escape the snake pit, but by the time she got there he was already dead, as her mother had turned into a snake and bitten him.

Oddrun appears to be a late addition to the legend, perhaps created so that the poet could "tell the story of the fall of the Nibelungs from a different point of view." She also provides an additional reason for enmity between Gunnar and Atli besides Atli's lust for treasure in Gunnar's role as Oddrun's lover.

==== Atlakviða ====
In Atlakviða, Atli invites Högni and Gunnar to his hall, claiming to wish to offer them great riches, but actually intending to kill them. Gunnar decides to come although Gudrun has sent them a warning. They cross through Myrkviðr (mirkwood) on their way to Atli's court. Once they arrive, Atli captures Gunnar and Högni. He demands Gunnar's hoard of gold, but Gunnar says he will not tell Atli until Högni is dead. Atli then kills Högni and brings his heart to Gunnar, who laughs and says now only he knows the secret of the hoard's location. He refuses to tell Atli, so Atli has him thrown into a snake pit. Gunnar plays his harp there until he is bitten by a snake and dies.

Atlakviða is commonly supposed to be one of the oldest poems in the Poetic Edda, possibly dating from the ninth century. The poem is particularly notable in that Sigurd is not mentioned at all. The presence of the forest Myrkviðr and the timelessness of the story show the poem to have moved into the realm of myth rather than historical legend. Alternatively, Myrkviðr could refer to the Ore Mountains, which are called Miriquidui by the historian Thietmar of Merseburg in the eleventh century.

==== Atlamál hin groenlenzku ====
Atlamál hin groenlenzku tells the same story as Atlakviða with several important differences. When Gunnar receives Atli's invitation, he and Högni shrug off the warning sent by Gudrun. They then ignore the runes read by Högni's wife Kostbera telling them not to go, and an ominous dream by Gunnar's wife Glaumvör. When they arrive at Atli's court, Atli's messenger, who has accompanied them, announces that they must die. Gunnar and Högni kill him. Gudrun attempts to negotiate between the two sides but is unsuccessful; she fights with her brothers until they are captured. Atli then has Gunnar and Högni killed in order to spite Gudrun. Gunnar is thrown into a snake pit, where he plays the harp with his toes as his hands are bound. He is bitten and dies.

=== Völsunga saga ===
The Völsunga saga tells a longer prose version of Gunther's life and deeds. It follows the plot given in the Poetic Edda fairly closely, although there is no indication that the author knew the other text. The author appears to have been working in Norway and to have known the Thidrekssaga (c. 1250), a translation of continental Germanic traditions into Old Norse (see Þiðrekssaga above). Therefore the Völsunga Saga is dated to sometime in the second half of the thirteenth century.

Gunnar is portrayed as the son of Gjúki and Grimhild and brother of Högni, Gudrun, and Guthorm. After Sigurd's arrival at the Burgundian court, Gunnar is encouraged by Grimhild to marry Brynhild. Brynhild, however, refuses to marry any man but the one who can ride through a wall of flame. Gunnar is unable to do this, and so Sigurd takes his shape and performs the action for him. Brynhild is thus forced to marry Gunnar. Some time later, Gudrun and Brynhild quarrel about whether Sigurd or Gunnar has the highest rank at the court. Gudrun then reveals the deception to Brynhild, who demands vengeance from Gunnar. He is unable to change her mind, and she demands that he kill Sigurd. Gunnar and Högni decide that their younger brother Guthorm, who has not sworn any oaths to Sigurd, should perform the murder. They feed him with wolf meat to make him more ferocious, then send him to kill Sigurd in his bed. After the murder, Brynhild commits suicide and prophesies Gunnar's fate.

In order to be reconciled to Brynhild's brother Atli for her death, Gunnar arranges for Sigurd's widow, his sister Gudrun, to marry Atli. He also seeks to marry Atli's other sister Oddrun, but Atli refuses and the two begin an affair. Gunnar instead marries the woman Glaumvör. After some time, desiring to avenge his sister and to gain Gunnar's treasure, Atli invites Gunnar and Högni to his court, intending to kill them. Gunnar is suspicious and Gudrun has tried to warn them not to come, but once he and Högni are drunk, Atli's messenger convinces them to accept the invitation. In spite of the warnings of their wives, Gunnar and Högni set out for Atli's court. Once they arrive the messenger reveals that it is a trap, and they kill him. Atli demands the treasure that Gunnar took for Sigurd, and when Gunnar refuses, they begin to fight. Eventually, Gunnar and Högni are captured. Gunnar says he will not tell Atli where the hoard is unless he sees Högni's heart. When he is finally shown the heart, Gunnar laughs and says that now only he knows where the hoard is and he will never tell. Atli then orders Gunnar thrown into a snake pit, where he plays the harp with his toes as his hands are bound. In the end, the snakes kill him.

=== Pictorial depictions ===
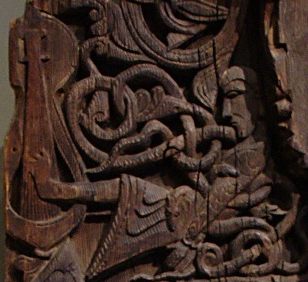
Gunnar in snakepit at Hylestad stave church, c. 1200. The instrument played is glossed "harp" today, but in Old Norse hǫrpu could apply to the Germanic lyre as well, which is depicted in this relief.

Gunnar's death in the snake pit is well attested in pictorial depictions. Not all images of a man in a snake pit can be identified as Gunnar: the image appears to predate the story of Gunnar's death. Although only images that also depict a harp can be securely identified as depicting Gunnar, Aðalheiður Guðmundsdóttir argues that the presence of a harp appears to have originally been a variant of the story of Gunnar's death, and that images that do not depict a harp can therefore also depict Gunnar.

Only one potential depiction is located outside of Scandinavia, on the Isle of Man: the Kirk Andreas cross (c. 1000) shows a bound figure surrounded by snakes who has been identified as Gunnar. An alternative interpretation is that the figure is meant to represent Loki.

The earliest depiction that has been relatively securely identified as Gunnar is the picture stone Södermanland 40, from Västerljung, Sweden. Guðmundsdóttir argues that the presence of several Sigurd stones nearby make an identification of the bound figure on the stone with Gunnar very likely.

Gunnar can be securely identified on a number of church portals and baptismal fonts in Norway or areas formerly under Norwegian control in Sweden (see the Norum font), with the earliest dating to the twelfth-century and most dating to around 1200 or later. In all of these images, Gunnar is shown with a harp. The presence of Gunnar's death in Christian religious contexts shows that a Christian interpretation was common: his death was seen as typologically related to the story of Daniel in the lions' den.

Seven additional images from Norway, Sweden, and the island of Gotland have been proposed to depict Gunnar in the snake pit, but without a harp: these images date from between the ninth and the eleventh centuries, and thus predate the secure attestations considerably. The earliest of these proposed identifications are the carvings on the cart found with the ninth-century Oseberg Ship burial. This identification is very controversial. Guðmundsdóttir suggests that the picture stone Klinte Hunninge I from Gotland (ninth/tenth century) may depict a version of the story of Oddrun's aid to Gunnar, as it shows an unidentified female figure by the snake pit. She argues in favor of identifying the figure in the snake pit in all of these images with Gunnar, noting their apparent shared iconography. Guðmundsdóttir nevertheless dismisses a number of other proposed images of Gunnar, on the grounds that they are not clear.

== Wagnerian mythology ==
Here Gunther is ruler of the Gibichungs, son of Gibich and Grimhilde. Hagen is his younger half-brother, Hagen's father being the villainous dwarf Alberich. Hagen convinces Gunther and Gutrune to respectively wed Brunhilde and Siegfried, using a love potion on Siegfried to make him forget Brunhilde. After Hagen murders Siegfried, he and Gunther argue over the ring and Hagen kills Gunther.

== See also ==
- Burgundians
- Nibelung
- Völsunga saga

== General and cited references ==
- Anton, Hans H. (1999). "Gundahar". In Beck, Heinrich; Geuenich, Dieter; Steuer, Heiko (eds.). Reallexikon der Germanischen Altertumskunde. Vol. 13. New York/Berlin: de Gruyter. pp. 193–194.
- Anton, Hans H. (1981). "Burgunden 4: Historisches". In Beck, Heinrich; Geuenich, Dieter; Steuer, Heiko (eds.). Reallexikon der Germanischen Altertumskunde. Vol. 4. New York/Berlin: de Gruyter. pp. 235–247.
- Andersson, Theodore M. (1980). The Legend of Brynhild. Ithaca, NY: Cornell University. ISBN 978-0-8014-1302-5.
- Beck, Heinrich (1973). "Atlilieder". In Beck, Heinrich; Geuenich, Dieter; Steuer, Heiko (eds.). Reallexikon der Germanischen Altertumskunde. Vol. 1. New York/Berlin: de Gruyter. pp. 465–467.
- Böldl, Klaus; Preißler, Katharina (2015). "Ballade". Germanische Altertumskunde Online. Berlin, Boston: de Gruyter.
- Edwards, Cyril (trans.) (2010). The Nibelungenlied. The Lay of the Nibelungs. Oxford: Oxford University Press. ISBN 978-0-19-923854-5.
- Gentry, Francis G.; McConnell, Winder; Müller, Ulrich; Wunderlich, Werner, eds. (2011) [2002]. The Nibelungen Tradition. An Encyclopedia. New York, Abingdon: Routledge. ISBN 978-0-8153-1785-2.
- Gillespie, George T. (1973). Catalogue of Persons Named in German Heroic Literature, 700-1600: Including Named Animals and Objects and Ethnic Names. Oxford: Oxford University. ISBN 978-0-19-815718-2.
- Guðmundsdóttir, Aðalheiður (2015). "Gunnarr Gjúkason and images of snake-pits". In Heizmann, Wilhelm; Oehrl, Sigmund (eds.). Bilddenkmäler zur germanischen Götter- und Heldensage. Berlin/Boston: de Gruyter. pp. 351–371. ISBN 978-3-11-040733-4.
- Guðmundsdóttir, Aðalheiður; Cosser, Jeffrey (2012). "Gunnarr and the Snake Pit in Medieval Art and Legend". Speculum. 87 (4): 1015–1049. doi:10.1017/S0038713412003144. JSTOR 23488628.
- Haubrichs, Wolfgang (2004). ""Heroische Zeiten?": Wanderungen von Heldennamen und Heldensagen zwischen den germanischen gentes des frühen Mittelalters". In Nahl, Astrid von; Elmevik, Lennart; Brink, Stefan (eds.). Namenwelten: Orts- und Personennamen in historischer Sicht. Berlin and New York: de Gruyter. pp. 513–534. ISBN 978-3-11-018108-1.
- Haymes, Edward R. (trans.) (1988). The Saga of Thidrek of Bern. New York: Garland. ISBN 978-0-8240-8489-9.
- Haymes, Edward R.; Samples, Susan T. (1996). Heroic legends of the North: an introduction to the Nibelung and Dietrich cycles. New York: Garland. ISBN 978-0-8153-0033-5.
- Heinzle, Joachim, ed. (2013). Das Nibelungenlied und die Klage. Nach der Handschrift 857 der Stiftsbibliothek St. Gallen. Mittelhochdeutscher Text, Übersetzung und Kommentar. Berlin: Deutscher Klassiker Verlag. ISBN 978-3-618-66120-7.
- Holzapfel, Otto (Otto Holzapfel), ed. (1974). Die dänischen Nibelungenballaden: Texte und Kommentare. Göppingen: Kümmerle. ISBN 978-3-87452-237-3.
- Lienert, Elisabeth (2015). Mittelhochdeutsche Heldenepik. Berlin: Erich Schmidt. ISBN 978-3-503-15573-6.
- Millet, Victor (2008). Germanische Heldendichtung im Mittelalter. Berlin, New York: de Gruyter. ISBN 978-3-11-020102-4.
- Müller, Jan-Dirk (2009). Das Nibelungenlied (3 ed.). Berlin: Erich Schmidt.
- The Poetic Edda: Revised Edition. Translated by Larrington, Carolyne. Oxford: Oxford University. 2014. ISBN 978-0-19-967534-0.
- Nedoma, Robert; Anton, Hans H. (1998). "Gibichungen". In Beck, Heinrich; Geuenich, Dieter; Steuer, Heiko (eds.). Reallexikon der Germanischen Altertumskunde. Vol. 12. New York/Berlin: de Gruyter. pp. 66–69.
- Rosenfeld, Hellmut (1981). "Burgunden 3: Burgundensagen". In Beck, Heinrich; Geuenich, Dieter; Steuer, Heiko (eds.). Reallexikon der Germanischen Altertumskunde. Vol. 4. New York/Berlin: de Gruyter. pp. 231–235.
- Sprenger, Ulrike (2002). "Nibelungensage". In Beck, Heinrich; Geuenich, Dieter; Steuer, Heiko (eds.). Reallexikon der Germanischen Altertumskunde. Vol. 21. New York/Berlin: de Gruyter. pp. 135–138.
- Uecker, Heiko (1972). Germanische Heldensage. Stuttgart: Metzler. ISBN 978-3-476-10106-8.
- Würth, Stephanie (2005). "Sigurdlieder". In Beck, Heinrich; Geuenich, Dieter; Steuer, Heiko (eds.). Reallexikon der Germanischen Altertumskunde. Vol. 28. New York/Berlin: de Gruyter. pp. 424–426.

Preceded by Giselher	King of Burgundy ?–437	Succeeded by Gunderic
