= Gernot =

Gernot is a German masculine given name, derived from Old High German "ger" (spear) and "khnoton" (to brandish). It is rare, but still in use in German speaking countries today. Notable people called Gernot include:

- Gundomar I, King of the Burgundians c. 407–411 is named Gernot in the Nibelungenlied
- Gernot von Fulda, head of Fulda monastery in 1165
- Gernot Blümel (born 1981), Austrian politician
- Gernot Endemann (1942–2020), German actor, host of Sesamstraße 1986–99 (see German article)
- Gernot Pachernigg (born 1981), Austrian singer
- Gernot Reinstadler (1970–1991), Austrian ski racer
- Gernot Rohr (born 1953), German football manager
- Gernot Schwab (born 1979), Austrian luger
- Gernot Süßmuth (born 1963), German violinist
- Gernot Wagner (born 1980), Austrian-American economist and author

== See also ==
- Gernet
