= Giselher =

Giselher, Gisilher, Gisiler, or Giseler (Latin: Gislaharius) is a Germanic masculine given name. It may refer to:

- Giselher of Burgundy, Burgundian king
- Gisilher (archbishop of Magdeburg) (died 1004), German ecclesiastic
- Giselher Klebe (1925–2009), German composer
- Giselher Schubert (born 1944), German musicologist
- Giselher Wilke (1922–2007), German army officer
- Giselher Wirsing (1907–1975), right-wing German journalist, author, and foreign policy expert

== See also ==
- Gislhere (died circa 785), English Bishop of Selsey
- Jan Jerzy Gisiler, 18th century Polish military officer
