= List of kings of Burgundy =

List of kings of Burgundy includes all kings of Burgundy, as a historical realm that went through several political transformations, being established at first as the Ancient Kingdom of Burgundy (411–534), and later revived as the Welfish Kingdom of Burgundy (933–1032). It continued to exist as the Kingdom of Burgundy (Arles) within the Holy Roman Empire (since 1032).

== Kings of the Burgundians ==
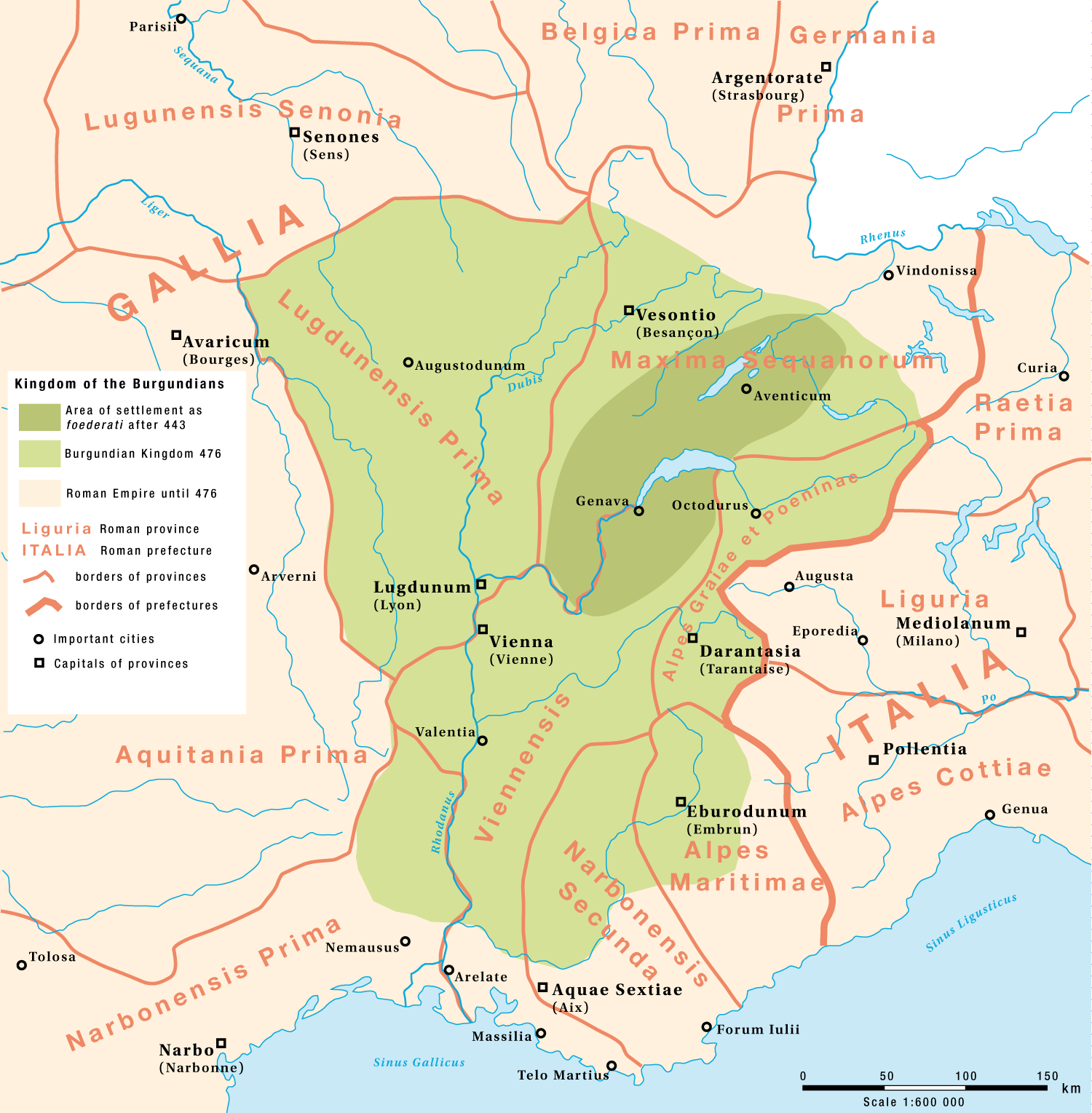
Ancient Kingdom of Burgundy (411–534)

- Gebicca (late 4th century – c. 407)
- Gundomar I (c. 407 – 411), son of Gebicca
- Giselher (c. 407 – 411), son of Gebicca
- Gunther (c. 407 – 436), son of Gebicca

Flavius Aëtius moves the Burgundians into Sapaudia (Upper Rhône Basin).

- Gunderic/Gundioc (436–473) opposed by
  - Chilperic I, brother of Gundioc (443–c. 480)
- division of the kingdom among the four sons of Gundioc:
  - Gundobad (473–516 in Lyon, king of all of Burgundy from 480),
  - Chilperic II (473–493 in Valence)
  - Godomar I (473–486 in Vienne)
  - Godegisel (473–500, in Vienne and Geneva)
- Sigismund, son of Gundobad (516–523)
- Godomar or Gundomar, son of Gundobad (523–534)

== Frankish kings in Burgundy ==
Gradually conquered by the Frankish kings Childebert I and Chlothar I from 532–534

=== Merovingian kings ===
- Childebert I, 534–558 (central parts)
- Theudebert I, 534–548 (northern parts)
- Chlothar I, 534–561 (southern parts), eventually uniting the entire kingdom
- Guntram (561–592)
- Childebert II, 592–595
- Theuderic II, 595–613

United with Neustria under one king, but a separate administration (613–751)

=== Carolingian kings in Burgundy ===
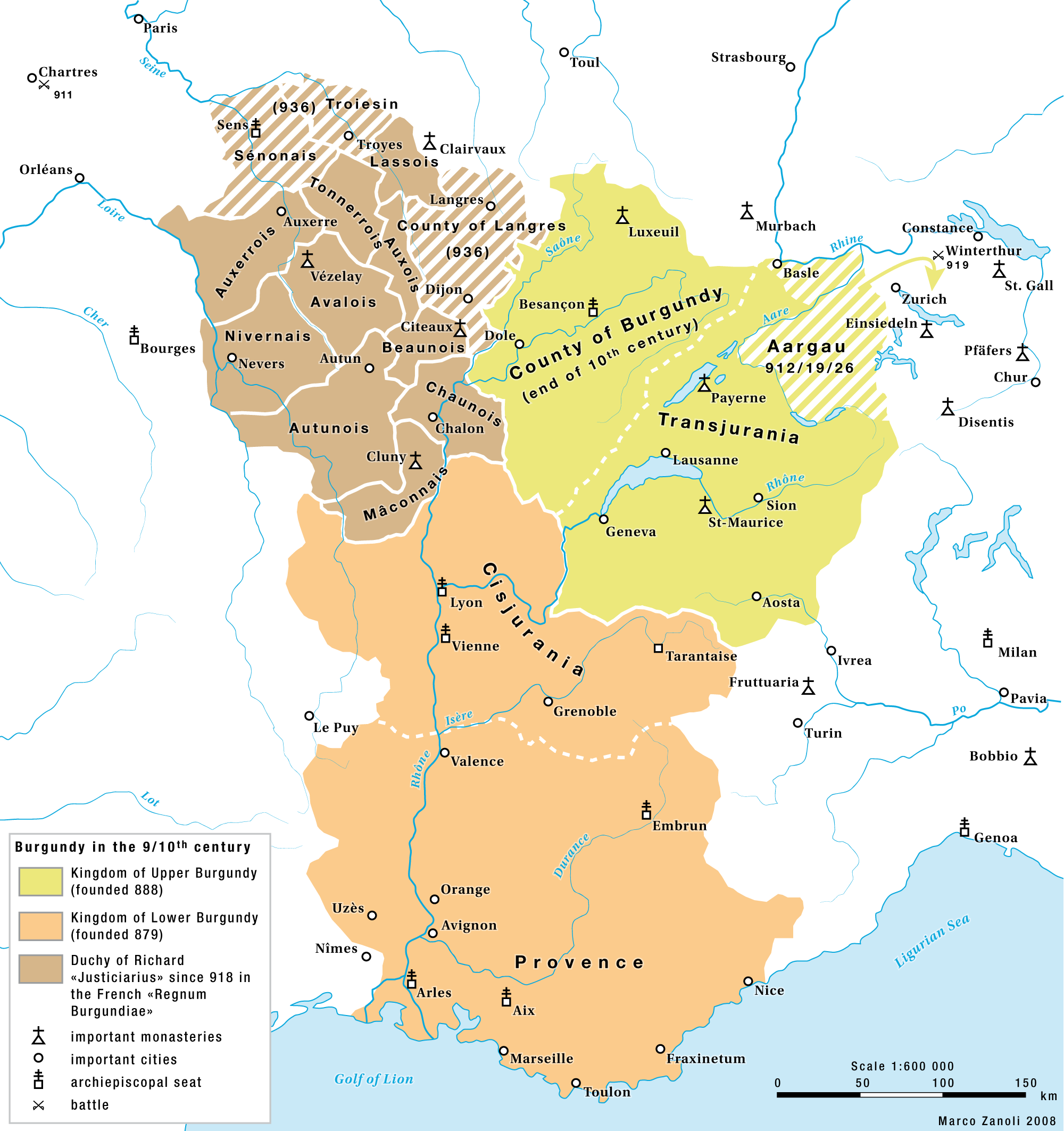
Burgundian and Provençal regions during the 9th and 10th centuries Lower Burgundy, with Provence Upper Burgundy Duchy of Burgundy

- Pippin the Younger, 751–768
- Carloman, 768–771
- Charlemagne, 771–814
- Louis the Pious, 814–840
- Lothair I, 840–855, king under his father after 817

The sons of Louis the Pious divided the Frankish kingdom in the treaty of Verdun in 843. Burgundy was divided between the brothers.

- Charles the Bald received the smaller part, west of the river Saône. This entity was officially called regnum burgundiae (Kingdom of Burgundy), but since the king of France delegated administration to dukes, the territory became known as the Duchy of Burgundy.
- Lothair I received the larger part, east of the river Saône, which retained the name of Kingdom of Burgundy

After Lothair's death in 855, his realm was divided between his sons. The Burgundian territories were divided between:

- Lothair II, who received the north, and
- Charles of Provence, who received the south, including Provence, Lyon and Vienne. His realm was called the regnum provinciae (Kingdom of Provence).

=== Kings of Lower Burgundy ===
The Kingdom of Lower Burgundy (or Cisjurane Burgundy) was also known as the Kingdom of Provence. Its capital was initially Vienne, then Arles.

- Charles of Provence (855–863)
  On his death, Provence divided between surviving brothers, Lothair II and the Emperor Louis II. The bulk goes to Louis.
- Louis II (863–875), also Holy Roman Emperor from 855
  On his death, as with his Kingdom of Italy, Louis's Provence goes to his uncle Charles the Bald .
- Charles the Bald (875–877), also Holy Roman Emperor from 875
- Louis the Stammerer (877–879)
  With the death of Louis the Stammerer, the nobles of Provence refused to elect his two sons and instead elected one of their own, Boso, as king. Boso married Ermengard, daughter of Louis II, to strengthen his and his son's claim.
- Boso (879–887)
- Louis the Blind (887–928), also Holy Roman Emperor from 901 to 905
  Louis's kingdom did not pass to his children, but instead to his brother-in-law, the husband of his sister, Hugh, who had acted as his regent since 905. Hugh never used the royal title in Provence.
- Hugh (911–933)
  In 933, Provence ceases to be a separate kingdom as Hugh exchanged it with Rudolph II of Upper Burgundy for the Iron Crown of Lombardy, that is, rule of Italy.

=== Kings of Upper Burgundy ===
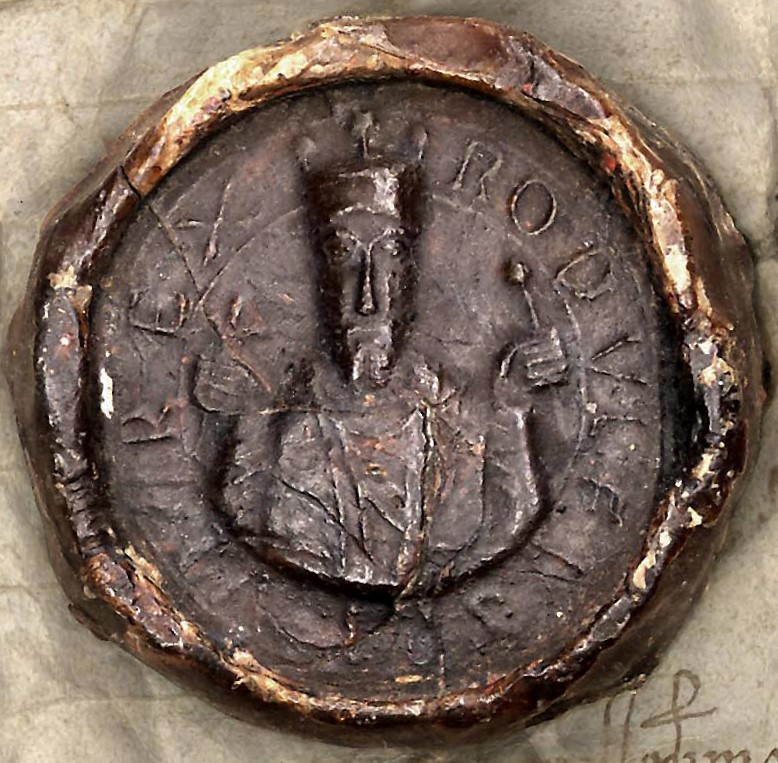
Seal of king Rudolph III from 1018

- Lothair II, 855–869

Lothair subsumed his portion of Burgundy into the Kingdom of Lotharingia and at his brother Charles of Provence's death, gained some northern districts from his kingdom. When Lothair II died in 869, his realm was divided between his uncles Charles the Bald and Louis the German in the Treaty of Mersen.

On the death in 888 of Emperor Charles the Fat, who until 884 had united all Frankish kingdoms except for Kingdom of Provence, the nobles and leading clergy of Upper Burgundy assembled at St Maurice and elected Rudolph, count of Auxerre, from the Elder Welf family, as king. At first, he tried to reunite the realm of Lothair II, but opposition by Arnulf of Carinthia forced him to focus on his Burgundian territory.

- Rudolf I (888–912)
- Rudolf II (912–937) In 933 Rudolph ceded his claims to the Kingdom of Italy to Hugh of Arles in return for the Kingdom of Provence, thus reuniting the two territories.
- Conrad I (937–993)
- Rudolph III (993–1032)

In 1032, the Kingdom of Burgundy was incorporated into the Holy Roman Empire as a third kingdom, with the German king as the king of Burgundy. From the 12th century it was often referred to as Kingdom of Arles.

== Kings of Burgundy (Arles) within the Holy Roman Empire ==
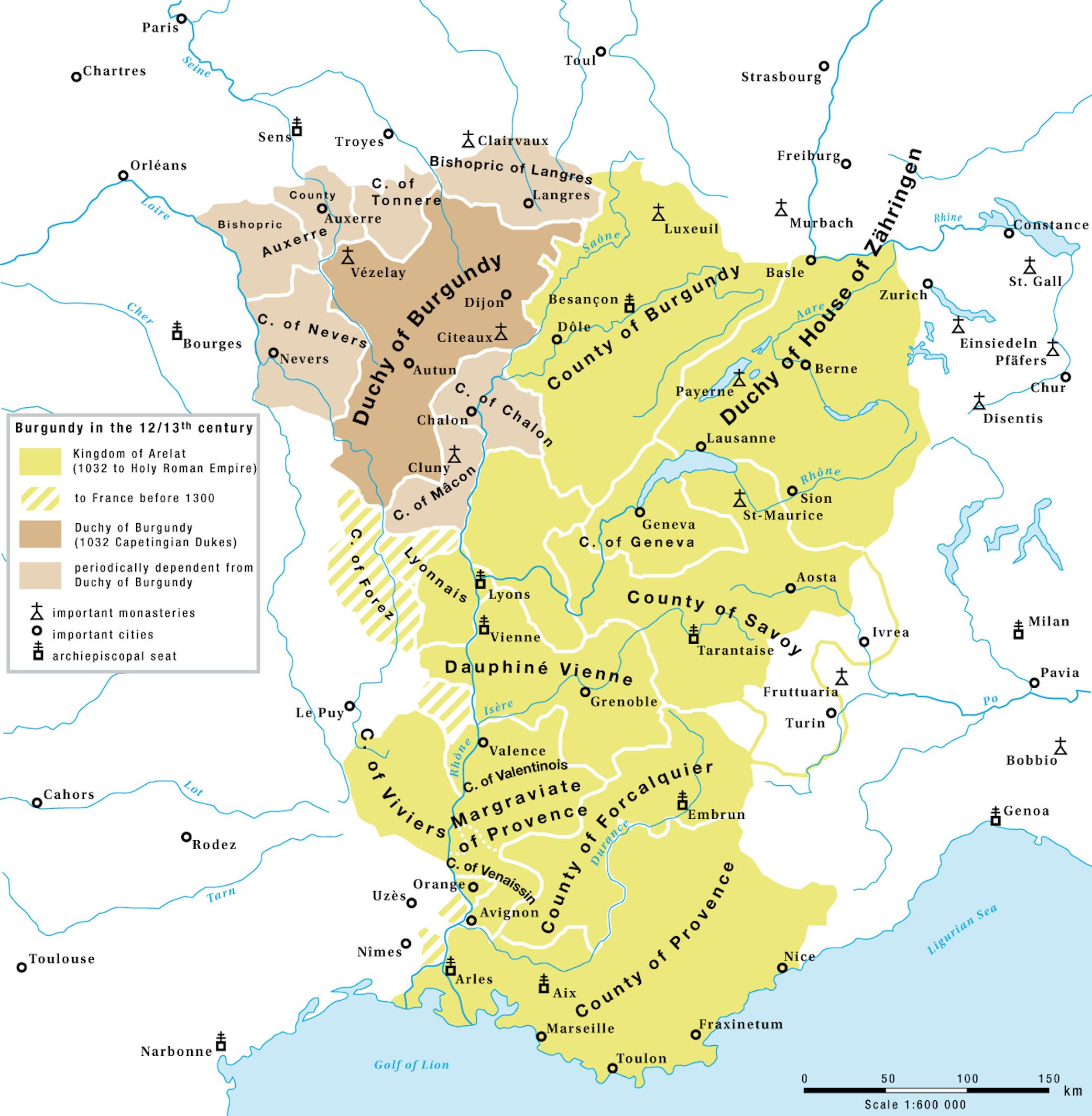
The Burgundian and Provençal lands in the 12th-13th century

=== Salian (Frankish) dynasty ===
- Conrad II, king 1032–1039, emperor after 1027
- Henry III, king 1039–1056, emperor 1046–1056
- Henry IV, king 1056–1105, emperor 1084–1105
- Henry V, king 1105–1125, emperor 1111–1125

=== Supplinburger ===
- Lothar III, king 1125–1137, emperor 1133–1137

=== Staufen (or Hohenstaufen dynasty) ===
- Conrad III, king 1138–1152
- Frederick I Barbarossa, king 1152, emperor 1155–1190
- Henry VI, king 1190, emperor 1191–1197
- Philip of Swabia, king 1198–1208
- Otto IV of Brunswick (House of Welf), king 1208–1215, emperor 1209–1215
- Frederick II, king 1212, emperor 1220–1250
- Conrad IV, king 1237–1254 (until 1250 under his father)

=== Luxemburg ===
- Charles IV, king 1365, emperor 1355–1378

== Rectors of Burgundy ==
Since the incorporation of the Kingdom of Burgundy into the Holy Roman Empire in 1032, several feudal lords were appointed by various emperors as the imperial representatives or governors (rectors) in the Burgundian (Arlesian) realm. Acting as the regent for her young son, emperor Henry IV, the empress Agnes (d. 1077) appointed Rudolf of Rheinfelden as imperial representative and governor of Burgundy in 1057.

Emperor Lothair III appointed Conrad I, Duke of Zähringen (d. 1152) as the imperial representative in the Arlesian kingdom. Conrad was titled as the Rector of Burgundy (Latin: Rector Burgundiae), and the same office was held by his successors from the House of Zähringen, until emperor Frederick II (d. 1250) decided to confirm that title to his own son and designated heir Henry (d. 1242). That appointment was made in order to keep feudal lords from further pretensions to regal powers associated with the rectoral title. After young Henry had been elected king of Germany in April 1220, the title disappeared for good.

During the Zähringen era, the effective power of the Rectors of Burgundy was restricted mainly to the northern parts of the Burgundian (Arlesian) realm, since the Zähringer had vast possessions in that region, particularly to the east of the Jura Mountains. Various attempts to enforce the Zähringer's rectoral authority into the southern parts of the kingdom failed, most notably a military campaign in 1153. After these failures, Emperor Frederick Barbarossa gained a firm hold of the western districts in 1156 by marrying Countess Beatrice I of Burgundy.

== See also ==
- Queen of Burgundy
- Duke of Burgundy
- Duchy of Burgundy
- Count of Burgundy
- County of Burgundy
- Dukes of Burgundy family tree

== Sources ==
- Balzaretti, Ross (2016). "Narratives of success and narratives of failure: Representations of the career of King Hugh of Italy (c. 885–948)". Early Medieval Europe. 24 (2): 185–208. doi:10.1111/emed.12140.
- Bouchard, Constance B. (1988). "The Bosonids or Rising to Power in the Late Carolingian Age". French Historical Studies. 15 (3): 407–431. doi:10.2307/286367. JSTOR 286367.
- Bouchard, Constance B. (1999). "Burgundy and Provence, 879–1032". The New Cambridge Medieval History. Vol. 3. Cambridge: Cambridge University Press. pp. 328–345. ISBN 978-0-521-36447-8.
- Cox, Eugene L. (1999). "The Kingdom of Burgundy, the Lands of the House of Savoy and Adjacent Territories". The New Cambridge Medieval History. Vol. 5. Cambridge: Cambridge University Press. pp. 358–374. ISBN 978-0-521-36289-4.
- Hauff, Andrea (2017). "The Kingdom of Upper Burgundy and the East Frankish Kingdom at the beginning of the 10th century". History Compass. 15 (8) e12396: 1–12. doi:10.1111/hic3.12396.
- Hauff, Andrea (2018). "Carolingian Traditions and New Beginnings: The Coronation of Rudolph I of Upper Burgundy". Bulletin du centre d'études médiévales d'Auxerre. 22 (1): 1–13.
- McKitterick, Rosamond (1983). The Frankish Kingdoms Under the Carolingians, 751-987. Harlow: Longman. ISBN 978-0-582-49005-5.
- MacLean, Simon (2001). "The Carolingian response to the revolt of Boso, 879–887". French Historical Studies. 10 (1): 21–48. doi:10.1111/1468-0254.00078.
- MacLean, Simon (2003). Kingship and Politics in the Late Ninth Century: Charles the Fat and the end of the Carolingian Empire. New York: Cambridge University Press. ISBN 978-1-139-44029-5.
- Riché, Pierre (1993). The Carolingians: A Family Who Forged Europe. Philadelphia: University of Pennsylvania Press. ISBN 0-8122-1342-4.
- Robinson, Ian S. (1999). Henry IV of Germany 1056-1106. Cambridge: Cambridge University Press. ISBN 978-0-521-54590-7.
