= Gundomar I =

Gundomar I (also Gundimar, Godomar, or Godemar) was according to legend the eldest son and successor of Gebicca, King of the Burgundians. He succeeded his father in 406 or 407 and reigned until 411. He was succeeded by his brother Giselher.

In the Nibelungenlied, he is named Gernot (sometimes Gernoz) and he is the brother of Gunther, Giselher and Kriemhild.

In Norse mythology, he is called Guthormr, and he was the murderer of Sigurd (Sigfried), the dragon slayer.

== See also ==
- Germanic king

Preceded by Gebicca	King of Burgundy; 407–411	Succeeded by Giselher
