= Arthur Thomas Hatto =

English scholar (1910–2010)

- Born: 11 February 1910; London
- Died: 6 January 2010 (aged 99); Harpenden
- Years active: 1934–1977
- Title: Professor
- Spouse: Rose Margot Hatto (née Feibelmann)
- Children: 1

Academic background
- Education: King's College London
- Thesis: A Middle German Apocalypse edited from the manuscript British Museum, Add. 15243 (1934)
- Influences: Frederick Norman, Robert Priebsch, John Rupert Firth

Academic work
- Discipline: German Language and Literature
- Institutions: Queen Mary College, London
- Notable works: Translations of Tristan, Parzival, and Nibelungenlied

Arthur Thomas Hatto (11 February 1910 – 6 January 2010) was an English scholar of German studies at the University of London, notable for translations of the Medieval German narrative poems Tristan by Gottfried von Strassburg, Parzival by Wolfram von Eschenbach, and the Nibelungenlied. He was also known for his theory of epic heroic poetry, and related publications. He retired in 1977, and in 1991 the British Academy elected him as a Senior Fellow.

== Early life and education ==
Arthur Thomas Hatto was born in London on 11 February 1910. His father was Thomas Hatto, a solicitor's clerk who later became the Assistant Chief Solicitor in the British Transport Commission legal service; his mother Alice Hatto (née Waters), a nurse. The family lived in Forest Hill, and later Clapham. Towards the end of the First World War, when Hatto was eight, he spent a formative year with his aunt in the relative safety of Barcombe, which Hatto would later call a "still semi-pagan" village where he was "running wild". Hatto's interest in the community and its surroundings, a rural landscape far removed from his London roots, foreshadowed his interest in the intricacies of human society. As he said later, "I didn’t feign knowing anything, so everything I saw, I learned."

In 1923, Hatto was awarded a scholarship to Dulwich College. He entered on the so-called "modern" side and studied German ("the most exotic language available", in his later words), Latin, French, arithmetic, and elementary mathematics, among other subjects, with middling results. His highest marks came in English, which Hatto attributed to a well-received essay about roads. Hatto also ran cross country and played rugby at the school.

Hatto met more academic success at King's College London, where his father, refusing to see his son "loll on a Sixth Form bench", sent him in 1927. Hatto studied there with Robert Priebsch, Frederick Norman, and Henry Gibson Atkins. Norman, in particular, who had such an influence on Hatto that Hatto forever after called Norman "my tutor", recognised Hatto's potential in academia. He refused to take back Hatto's books at the end of term, stating "No, not yours, Mr Hatto, you will be needing them in years to come!" (Note: In 1973, Hatto would edit a volume of Norman's essays in Norman's honour.)

In an effort to improve his German, Hatto left in 1932 for the University of Bern, where he taught as a Lektor for English; beforehand, John Rupert Firth helped coach him in how to teach the subject. While in Bern, Hatto also studied under Helmut de Boor and Fritz Strich, taught himself the local dialect Bärndütsch, and played the rural Swiss sport hornussen. In 1934, King's College awarded Hatto a Master of Arts with distinction for his thesis, "A Middle German Apocalypse Edited from the Manuscript British Museum, Add. 15243". (Note: The topic was suggested by Priebsch. Hatto argued that the manuscript had been written in southwestern Thuringia between 1350 and 1370, and that it was related to the early-15th-century MS Meiningen 57. In 1936, Hatto published a German translation of his thesis.) Hatto remained proud of the accomplishment, which, at the time, was considered the equivalent of a doctorate.

Also in 1934, Hatto, who had much enjoyed his time in Bern, was offered an assistant lectureship in German at King's College. He returned, bringing back with him Rose Margot Feibelmann, a medical student from Düsseldorf whom he married in 1935. As she was Jewish, the move probably saved her life and the lives of her parents, who followed in March 1939. The Hattos settled first in Radlett and later in Mill Hill. After four years the position was no longer needed; (Note: The position was no longer needed because Norman, who had until then held a half-time readership at both King's College and University College London (earning some £350 from each, rather than £500 for a full-time position), became full-time at King's, replacing a retiring Atkins. Norman's move, in turn, was precipitated by the fact that his position was no longer needed at University College after Leonard Ashley Willoughby was appointed a professor.) Norman first encouraged Hatto apply for a vacancy at Newcastle University, and then, after the Hattos were reluctant to uproot themselves, recommended him for a new lectureship at Queen Mary College, London. Hatto was chosen over many other applicants, in part, he thought, because the Principal, Sir Frederick Barton Maurice, admired his skill at rugby. (Note: Maurice, who had been educated at St Paul's School, London, asked Hatto during the interview whether he had participated "in the famous match between Dulwich and St Paul's", to which Hatto replied "Yes, Sir, twice, and beat them twice." According to Norman, who served as the expert adviser at the interview, once Hatto left the room Maurice exclaimed "That's the man I want.") In 1938 Hatto became the Head of the Department of German, a position he would hold until his retirement in 1977.

== Second World War ==
Hatto's appointment at Queen Mary College had scarcely begun when, in February 1939, he was recruited, on the recommendations of Maurice and Norman, to work in the cryptographic bureau in Room 40 at the Foreign Office. Norman was working there also; Hatto initially worked under him in the Air Section, until on 3 September the two were sent to Bletchley Park, where they worked under John Tiltman. At least two other professors of German, Walter Bruford and Leonard Ashley Willoughby, had served in cryptography during the First World War, and many more served during the Second. As a "nursery for Germanists", Bletchley Park included in its ranks Bruford, Leonard Forster, Kenneth Brooke, Trevor Jones, C. T. Carr, D. M. Mennie, R. V. Tymms, Dorothy Reich, William Rose, K. C. King, F. P. Pickering, and H. B. Willson.

Hatto was well-suited to the task of cryptography, given his philological background and his fluent German; rare amongst his Bletchley Park colleagues, he was able to decrypt even messages that had become corrupted. This skill generated both tension with and envy from with Oliver Strachey, working above Hatto. Strachey, however, had also assigned to Hatto's section Leonard Robert Palmer and Denys Page, who recognised Hatto's abilities and tasked him with scrutinising ciphers to look for hints of future ciphers. One of his successes was in discovering that a current cipher revealed the three-letter call signs from the preamble to messages in a future cipher, which served as the key to communications between the land, sea and air arms of the Third Reich's combined armed forces, the Wehrmacht. The discovery came before, and aided, the Allied invasion of Sicily.

After Germany fell, part of Hatto's section was dispatched to Tokyo, by way of Ceylon. Page invited Hatto to join, although he somewhat reluctantly declined, his daughter Jane having just been born.

Hatto kept silent about his wartime work, even after the work done at Bletchley Park was revealed in F. W. Winterbotham's book 1974 The Ultra Secret. Though he was not named in the book, he was nevertheless alarmed by it. According to one of his colleagues, its publication led him to fear being kidnapped by the Soviets to the Lubyanka, "so far removed from the Reading Room of the British Museum".

== Postwar career ==
Wartime duties kept Hatto busy until 1945, although from 1944 onward he was allowed to lecture in Medieval German at University College London one day a week. He returned to Queen Mary College in 1945, to find the school struggling with its finances and enrolment, not to mention damaged from bombings. At least once the coke supply ran out, requiring water to be boiled or delivered by handcart. The department numbered just Hatto and a part-time colleague upon his return, though its status was raised in 1946, with the promotion of Hatto to Reader in German. Hatto was again promoted, to Professor, in 1953. Over his tenure, he developed a strong German Department, eventually numbering five full-time staff and one and a half language assistants.

Though much of his work was addressed to an academic readership, Hatto's best-known works are translations of three Medieval German poems: Tristan by Gottfried von Strassburg, Parzival by Wolfram von Eschenbach, and the Nibelungenlied. These were three of what Hatto saw as the four great German narrative poems of the age (the fourth, Willehalm, was translated by one of his pupils).

Following the translation of Tristan, published as a Penguin Classic in 1960, Hatto received an invitation from a professor of German at the University of Auckland to visit for several months in 1965. The ensuing trip around the world took Hatto to Istanbul, Delhi, Kathmandu, Bangkok, Auckland, Wellington, Fiji, Hawaii, California, the Grand Canyon, and New York, where he acquired a Kirghiz-Russian dictionary.

Hatto retired in 1977, by which time he had had at least 72 works published.

== Personal life ==
Hatto and his wife Margot had a daughter, Jane, and a son-in-law, Peter. They remained married until her death in 2000.

Hatto himself died of bronchopneumonia shortly before turning 100, on 6 January 2010, at Field House in Harpenden.

== Publications ==
For a list of publications through 1977, see Griffith-Williams 1977; for some subsequent publications, see Flood 2011.

=== Books ===
- A Middle German Apocalypse Edited from the Manuscript British Museum Additional 15243 (M.A.). University of London. 1934. OCLC 1006100613.
- Norman, Frederick (1973). Hatto, Arthur Thomas (ed.). Three essays on the Hildebrandslied. Publications of the Institute of Germanic Studies. Vol. 16. London: Institute of Germanic Studies, University of London. ISBN 0-85457-052-7.
- Hatto A.T. The Memorial Feast For Kökötöy-Khan: (Kökötöydün Ashı): A Kyrgyz Epic Poem / Edited for the first time from a photocopy of the unique manuscript with translation and commentary by A. T. HATTO. – Oxford: Oxford University Press, 1977.

=== Chapters ===
- Hatto, Arthur Thomas (1936). "Eine deutsche Apokalypse des 14. Jahrhunderts". In Vollmer, Hans (ed.). Neue Texte zur Bibelverdeutschung des Mittelalters. Bibel und deutsche Kultur (in German). Vol. VI. Potsdam: Akademische Verlagsgesellschaft Athenaion. pp. 179–199. ISBN 0-85457-052-7.

=== Articles ===
- "Minnesangs Frühling, 40, 19ff". The Modern Language Review. XXXIII (2). Modern Humanities Research Association: 266–268. April 1938. doi:10.2307/3715015. JSTOR 3715015.
  - Correction published in "'Minnesangs Frühling', 40, 19ff". The Modern Language Review. XXXIII (2). Modern Humanities Research Association: 422. July 1938. doi:10.2307/3715413. JSTOR 3715413.
- "Sînen Dienest Verliesen". The Modern Language Review. XXXIII (3). Modern Humanities Research Association: 416–422. July 1938. doi:10.2307/3715412. JSTOR 3715412.
- "Vrouwen Schouwen". The Modern Language Review. XXXIV (1). Modern Humanities Research Association: 40–49. January 1939. doi:10.2307/3717128. JSTOR 3717128.
- "Archery and Chivalry: A Noble Prejudice". The Modern Language Review. XXXV (1). Modern Humanities Research Association: 40–54. January 1940. doi:10.2307/3717406. JSTOR 3717406.
- "Were Walther and Wolfram Once at the Same Court?". The Modern Language Review. XXXV (4). Modern Humanities Research Association: 529–530. October 1940. doi:10.2307/3717833. JSTOR 3717833.
- "Gallantry in the Mediaeval German Lyric". The Modern Language Review. XXXVI (4). Modern Humanities Research Association: 480–487. October 1941. doi:10.2307/3717090. JSTOR 3717833.
- "The Name of God in Gothic". The Modern Language Review. XXXIX (3). Modern Humanities Research Association: 247–251. July 1944. doi:10.2307/3717861. JSTOR 3717861.
- "Parzival 183, 9". The Modern Language Review. XL (1). Modern Humanities Research Association: 48–49. January 1945. doi:10.2307/3717751. JSTOR 3717751.
- "The Name of God in Germanic". The Modern Language Review. XLI (1). Modern Humanities Research Association: 67–68. January 1946. doi:10.2307/3717496. JSTOR 3717496.
- "'Venus and Adonis'—And the Boar". The Modern Language Review. XLI (4). Modern Humanities Research Association: 353–361. October 1946. doi:10.2307/3716727. JSTOR 3716727.
- "Two Notes on Chrétien and Wolfram". The Modern Language Review. XLII (2). Modern Humanities Research Association: 243–246. April 1947. doi:10.2307/3717233. JSTOR 3717233.
- "On Wolfram's Conception of the 'Graal'". The Modern Language Review. XLIII (2). Modern Humanities Research Association: 216–222. April 1948. doi:10.2307/3717577. JSTOR 3717577.
- "On Chretien and Wolfram". The Modern Language Review. XLIV (3). Modern Humanities Research Association: 280–385. July 1949. JSTOR 3717658.
- "Snake-swords and Boar-helmets in Beowulf". English Studies. XXXVIII (4): 145–160. August 1957a. doi:10.1080/00138385708596994.
- "Notes and News: Snake-swords and Boar-helmets". English Studies. XXXVIII (6): 257–259. December 1957b. doi:10.1080/00138385708597004.

=== Reviews ===
- "Spruchdichtung des Volkes. Vor- und Frühformen der Volksdichtung by Robert Petsch". The Modern Language Review. XXXIV (1). Modern Humanities Research Association: 114–115. January 1939. doi:10.2307/3717165. JSTOR 3717165.

== Bibliography ==
- Combridge, Rosemary; Fowler, Frank M. (January 1977). "A. T. Hatto: A Tribute". German Life and Letters. 30 (2). Blackwell: 91–93. doi:10.1111/j.1468-0483.1977.tb00521.x.
- Flood, John L. (2011). Johnston, Ron (ed.). "Arthur Thomas Hatto: 1910–2010" (PDF). Biographical Memoirs of Fellows of the British Academy. X. British Academy: 172–198. doi:10.5871/bacad/9780197264904.001.0001. ISBN 9780197264904.
- Flood, John L. (29 May 2014). "Hatto, Arthur Thomas". Oxford Dictionary of National Biography (online ed.). Oxford University Press. doi:10.1093/ref:odnb/103459. ISBN 9780198614111. (Subscription, Wikipedia Library access or UK public library membership required.)
- Griffith-Williams, Brenda (January 1977). "Publications of A. T. Hatto (Excluding Reviews)". German Life and Letters. 30 (2). Blackwell: 172–177. doi:10.1111/j.1468-0483.1977.tb00528.x.
- "Hatto Arthur Thomas". Deaths. The Times. No. 69846. London. 16 January 2010. p. 102. Archived from the original on 13 September 2021.
- Moss, G. P.; Saville, M. V. (1985). From Palace to College: An Illustrated Account of Queen Mary College. London: Queen Mary College. ISBN 0-902238-06-X.
- "Professor Arthur Hatto: Distinguished scholar and translator whose labours illuminated literatures ranging from Middle High German to Kirgiz". Obituaries. The Times. No. 69899. London. 19 March 2010. p. 79. Archived from the original on 13 September 2021.

- Also published online

- Uray-Kőhalmi, Käthe (September 2010). "Arthur Thomas Hatto: 1910–2010". Acta Orientalia Academiae Scientiarum Hungaricae. 63 (3). Akadémiai Kiadó: 383–386. doi:10.1556/AOrient.63.2010.3.10. JSTOR 23659012.
