= Nibelungenlied =

Middle High German epic poem from around 1200

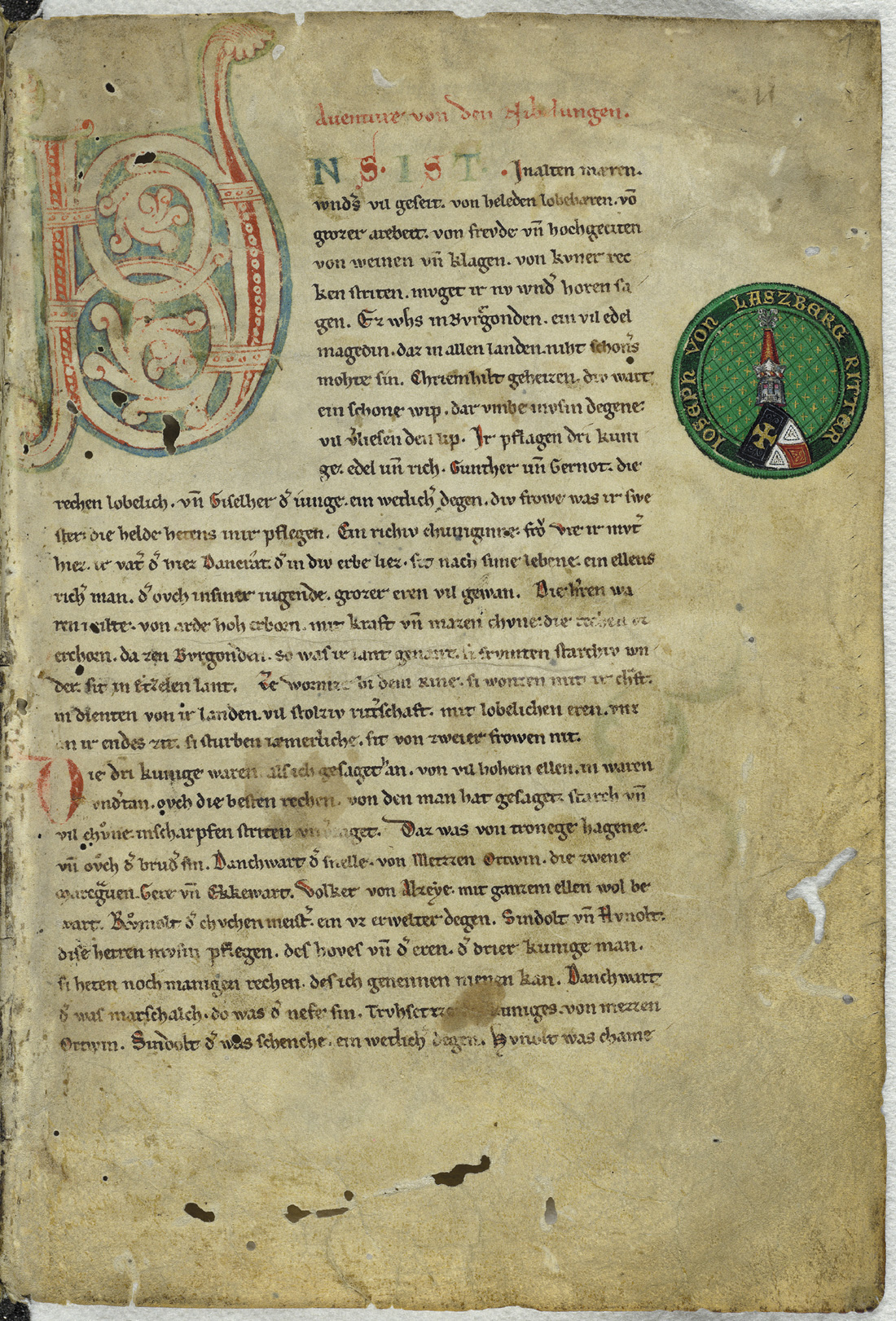
First page from Manuscript C (c. 1230)

The Nibelungenlied (German pronunciation: [ˈniːbəlʊŋən-], [ˈnɪbəlʊŋən-] or [ˌniːbəˈlʊŋənˌliːt]; Middle High German: Der Nibelunge liet or Der Nibelunge nôt), translated as The Song of the Nibelungs, is an epic poem written around 1200 in Middle High German. Its anonymous poet was likely from the region of Passau. The Nibelungenlied is based on an oral tradition of Germanic heroic legend that has some of its origin in historic events and individuals of the 5th and 6th centuries and that spread throughout almost all of Germanic-speaking Europe. Scandinavian parallels to the German poem are found especially in the heroic lays of the Poetic Edda and in the Völsunga saga.

The poem is split into two parts. In the first part, the prince Siegfried comes to Worms to acquire the hand of the Burgundian princess Kriemhild from her brother King Gunther. Gunther agrees to let Siegfried marry Kriemhild if Siegfried helps Gunther acquire the warrior-queen Brünhild as his wife. Siegfried does this and marries Kriemhild; however, Brünhild and Kriemhild become rivals, leading eventually to Siegfried's murder by the Burgundian vassal Hagen with Gunther's involvement.

In the second part, the widow Kriemhild is married to Etzel, king of the Huns. She later invites her brother and his court to visit Etzel's kingdom intending to kill Hagen. Her revenge results in the death of all the Burgundians who came to Etzel's court as well as the destruction of Etzel's kingdom and the death of Kriemhild herself.

The Nibelungenlied was the first heroic epic put into writing in the German vernacular, helping to found a larger genre of written heroic poetry there. The poem's tragedy appears to have bothered its medieval audience, and very early on a sequel was written, the Nibelungenklage, which made the tragedy less final. The poem was forgotten after around 1500 but was rediscovered in 1755. Dubbed the "German Iliad", the Nibelungenlied began a new life as the German national epic. The poem was appropriated for nationalist purposes and was heavily used in anti-democratic, reactionary, and Nazi propaganda before and during the Second World War. Its legacy today is most visible in Richard Wagner's operatic cycle Der Ring des Nibelungen, which, however, is mostly based on Old Norse sources. In 2009, the three main manuscripts of the Nibelungenlied were inscribed in UNESCO's Memory of the World Register in recognition of their historical significance. It has been called "one of the most impressive, and certainly the most powerful, of the German epics of the Middle Ages".

== Versions and manuscripts ==
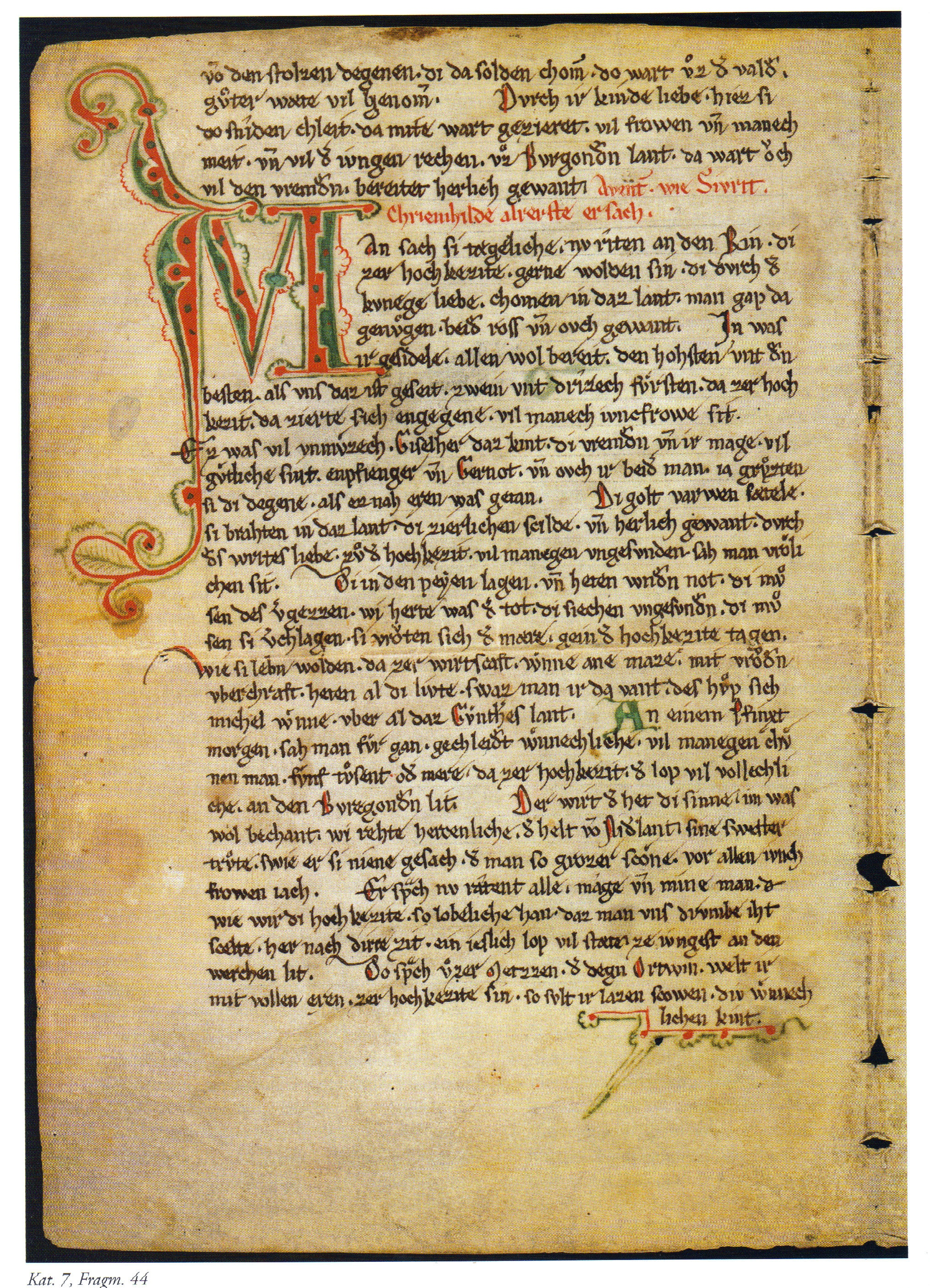
Nibelungenlied Fragment, Berlin, SB, Fragm. 44

There are 37 known manuscripts and manuscript fragments of the Nibelungenlied and its variant versions. Eleven of these manuscripts are essentially complete. Twenty-four manuscripts are in various fragmentary states of completion, including one version in Dutch (manuscript "T").

The text of the different manuscripts of the Nibelungenlied varies considerably from one another, though there is less variance than found in many other Middle High German heroic epics, such as the Dietrich epics. Although the different versions vary in their exact wording and include or exclude stanzas found in other versions, the general order of events, the order of the appearance of characters, their actions, and the content of their speeches are all relatively stable between versions extant before the 1400s. Generally, scholars have proposed that all versions of the Nibelungenlied derive from an original version (the "archetype") via alterations and reworking; Jan-Dirk Müller instead proposes that the Nibelungenlied has always existed in variant forms, connecting this variance to the transition of the epic's material from orality to literacy.

Using the versions provided by the three oldest complete manuscripts, the Hohenems-Munich manuscript A (c. 1275–1300), the Sankt Gall manuscript B (c. 1233–1266), and the Hohenems-Donaueschingen manuscript C (c. 1225–1250), (Note: The letters A, B, and C for the manuscripts come from Karl Lachmann's appraisal of their relative nearness to the archetype - his views are now considered obsolete.) scholars have traditionally differentiated two versions that existed near the time of the poem's composition; A and B are counted as belonging to a single version *AB, while a version *C is attested by manuscript C and most of the earliest fragments, including the oldest attestation of the Nibelungenlied. Using the final words of the epic, *AB is also called the Not-version, and *C the Lied-version; the *C version is clearly a reworking of an earlier version, but it is not clear if this version was *AB; *AB may also be an expanded version of an earlier text. Most scholars assume that manuscript B is the closest to the original *AB version.

By 1300, the Nibelungenlied was circulating in at least five versions:

1. the Not-version *A;
2. the Not-version *B;
3. the Lied-version *C;
4. in a mixed version *Db;
5. in a mixed version *Jdh (or *J/*d).

Most fragments from after 1300 belong to the two mixed versions (Mischfassungen), which appear to be based on copies of both the Not and Lied versions. Three later manuscripts provide variant versions: one, m (after 1450), is lost while two are still extant: n (c. 1470/80) and k (c.1480/90). Manuscripts m and n contain a story of Siegfried's youth that more closely resembles that found in the Old Norse Þiðreks saga and early modern German Lied vom Hürnen Seyfrid, while k shortens the text and modernizes the language.

== Synopsis ==
=== Opening stanza ===
The famous opening of the Nibelungenlied is actually thought to be an addition by the adaptor of the "*C" version of the Nibelungenlied, as it does not appear in the manuscript of B, which probably represents the earlier version. (Note: The complicated meter of the stanza, with internal rhyme, is taken as further evidence that it is not original.) It may have been inspired by the prologue of the Nibelungenklage.

Original (MS C)
Uns ist in alten mæren || wunders vil geseit
von helden lobebæren,|| von grôzer arebeit,
von fröuden, hôchgezîten, || von weinen und von klagen,
von küener recken strîten || muget ir nu wunder hœren sagen.

Modern German
Uns ist in alten Geschichten viel Staunenswertes gesagt
von ruhmwürdigen Helden, von großer Mühsal (im Kampf),
von Freuden und Festen, von Weinen und Klagen,
vom Kampf kühner Helden könnt ihr jetzt viel Staunenswertes sagen hören.

English
In ancient tales many marvels are told us:
of renowned heroes worthy of praise, of great hardship,
of joys, festivities, of weeping and lamenting,
of bold warriors' battles—now you may hear such marvels told.

Manuscript B instead begins with the introduction of Kriemhild, the protagonist of the work.

=== Part 1 ===
Kriemhild grows up as a beautiful woman in Worms, the capital of the Burgundian kingdom, under the protection of her brothers Gunther, Gernot, and Giselher. There she has a dream portending doom, in which she raises a falcon that is killed by two eagles. Her mother explains that this means she will love a man who will be killed; Kriemhild thus swears to remain unmarried.

At the same time, the young Siegfried is receiving his courtly education in the Netherlands; he is dubbed a knight and decides that he will go to Worms to ask for Kriemhild as his wife. The story of how Siegfried slew a dragon, winning a large hoard of gold, and then bathed in the dragon's blood to receive an impenetrable skin is then recounted by Hagen, one of Gunther's vassals, when the Burgundians see Siegfried approaching. Siegfried lives in Worms for a year without seeing Kriemhild before Siegfried helps Gunther fight against attack by the Saxons and Danes. Because of his valor in combat, he is finally allowed to see Kriemhild.

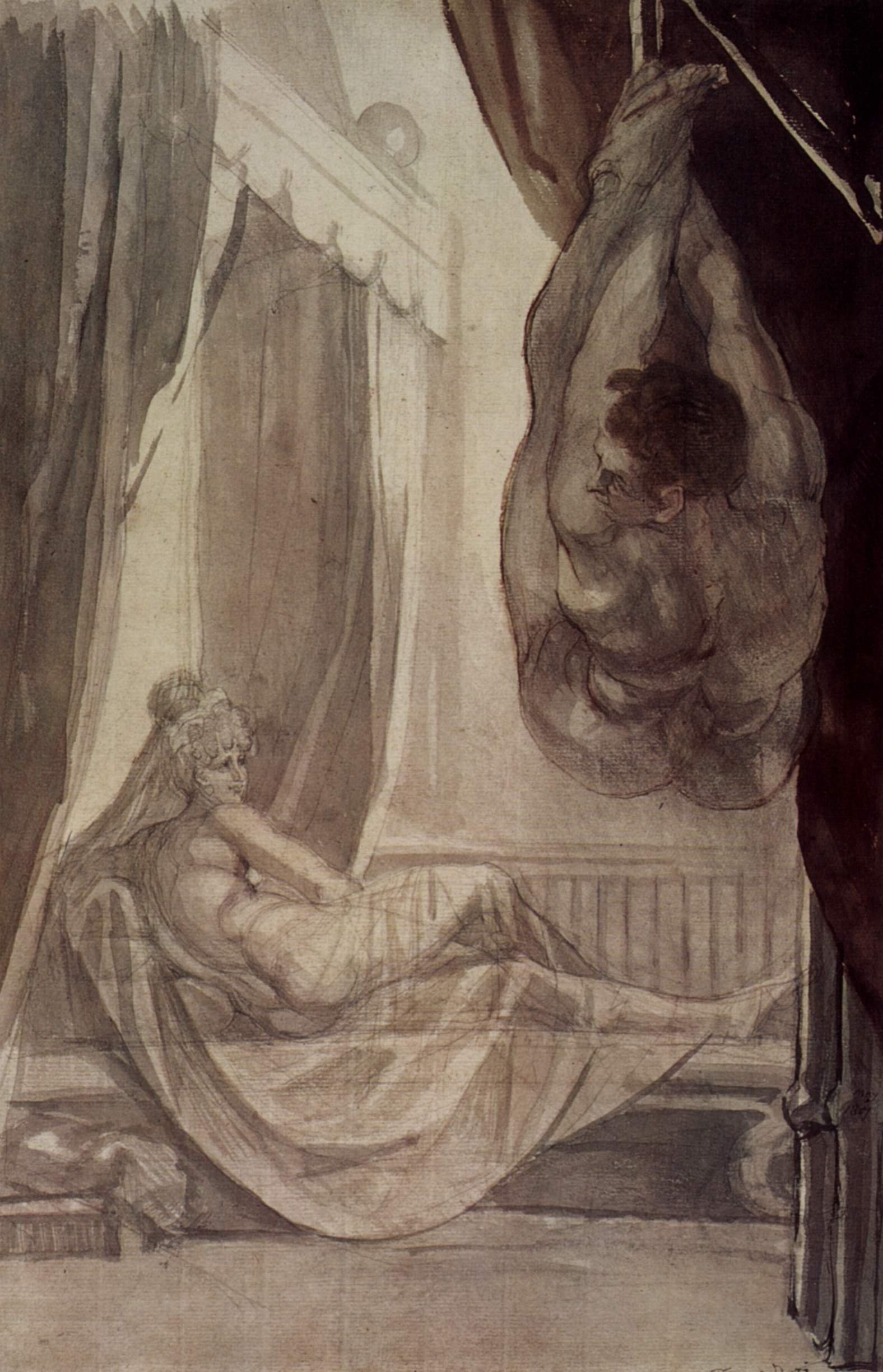
Gunther's wedding night (Johann Heinrich Füssli 1807)

Gunther decides that he wishes to take the Icelandic queen Brünhild as his wife. However, Brünhild is supernaturally strong and challenges those seeking her hand in marriage in various martial and physical contests, killing the losers. Therefore, Gunther wants Siegfried's help; Siegfried tells Gunther he shouldn't marry Brünhild, but is convinced to help by Gunther's promise that he will let him marry Kriemhild in exchange. Arriving in Iceland, Siegfried claims to be Gunther's vassal and uses his magical cloak of invisibility (Tarnkappe) to secretly help Gunther win in all of the contests and Brünhild agrees to return to Worms and marry Gunther. Once they have returned, Siegfried asks Kriemhild to marry him; this displeases Brünhild, as she believes Siegfried to be a vassal while Kriemhild is the daughter of a king. When Gunther does not explain why he is letting a vassal marry his sister, Brünhild refuses to sleep with him on their wedding night, instead tying him up and hanging him from a hook. The next night, Gunther asks Siegfried to wrestle Brünhild into submission using his Tarnkappe; Siegfried takes Brünhild's belt and ring as a trophy and then lets Gunther take her virginity, causing her to lose her strength.

After the wedding, Siegfried and Kriemhild return to the Netherlands. Before they do, Kriemhild wants to ask for her part of the inheritance from her brothers, but Siegfried advises her not to. Kriemhild wishes to take Hagen with her, but he refuses. Many years pass. In the Netherlands, Siegfried and Kriemhild are crowned; both couples have a son.

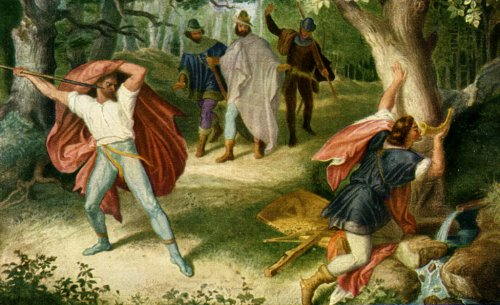
"Siegfried's Death" (Julius Schnorr von Carolsfeld, 1847)

Brünhild is unhappy that Siegfried, whom she still believes to be Gunther's vassal, never comes to pay tribute. She convinces Gunther to invite Siegfried and Kriemhild to Worms for a feast. However, she and Kriemhild soon begin arguing about which of their husband's has the higher rank. The conflict peaks when both Kriemhild and Brünhild arrive at the cathedral at the same time; the higher ranking one should enter first. Brünhild repeats her assertion that Siegfried is a vassal, after which Kriemhild claims that Siegfried, not Gunther, took Brünhild's virginity, producing the ring and belt as proof. Siegfried and Gunther afterwards deny this, but Brünhild remains offended. Hagen advises Gunther to have Siegfried murdered.

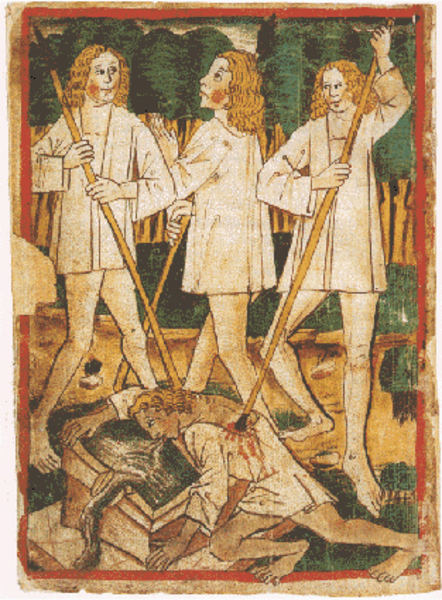
The death of Siegfried. Nibelungenlied manuscript K.

Hagen goes to Kriemhild and tells her that there is a new war brewing against the Saxons; he would like to know where Siegfried is vulnerable so that he can protect him. Kriemhild agrees to mark the spot between Siegfried's shoulder blades where a leaf had prevented his skin from becoming invulnerable. Rather than a war, however, Gunther invites Siegfried to go hunting. When Siegfried is bent over a spring to drink water, Hagen spears him in the back, killing him. The body is placed in front of Kriemhild's door. Kriemhild immediately suspects Gunther and Hagen and her suspicions are confirmed when Siegfried's corpse bleeds in Hagen's presence. Siegfried is buried and Kriemhild chooses to stay in Worms, eventually officially reconciling with Hagen and her brothers though she stays in mourning. Hagen has Siegfried's hoard taken from her. Kriemhild remains unmarried for 13 years.

=== Part 2 ===
After the death of his first wife, Helche, Etzel, the king of the Huns, chooses to ask Kriemhild to marry him. All of the Burgundians except for Hagen are in favor of the match. Kriemhild only agrees after Etzel's messenger, Margrave Rüdiger von Bechelaren, swears loyalty to her personally and she realizes she can use the Huns to gain revenge on Siegfried's murderers. Before her departure, she demands Siegfried's treasure but Hagen refuses her. After seven years as Etzel's wife, Kriemhild bears him a son, Ortlieb, and after thirteen years, she convinces Etzel to invite her brothers and Hagen to a feast. In Worms, Hagen advises against traveling to Etzel's castle, but Gunther and his brothers believe that Kriemhild has reconciled with them and decide to go. Nevertheless, they take Hagen's advice to travel with an army.

The departure of the Burgundians, who are now increasingly called Nibelungs, is accompanied by various ill omens, but these are all dismissed by Hagen. When the Burgundians are about to cross the Danube in Bavaria, Hagen encounters three nixies, who prophecy to him that only the king's chaplain will return from Etzel's hall. To try to prove the prophecy false, Hagen throws the chaplain overboard from the ferry, but he swims to shore and returns to Worms. Hagen then destroys the ferry once they have landed to show that there can be no return. When the Bavarians attack the Burgundians in order to avenge their ferryman, whom Hagen had killed, Hagen takes control of the defense and defeats them. The Burgundians then arrive in Etzel's kingdom and are welcomed to the city of Bechelaren by the Margrave Rüdiger; on Hagen's suggestion, Rüdiger betroths his daughter to Gisleher and gives Gernot a sword and Hagen a shield.

When the Burgundians arrive at Etzelnburg, they are warned by Dietrich von Bern that Kriemhild hates them. Kriemhild greets only Gisleher with a kiss and asks Hagen if he has brought with him what he took from her; later, she approaches him wearing her crown and in the company of many armed men. Hagen refuses to stand up for Kriemhild and places Siegfried's sword across her legs; recognizing it, Kriemhild's accompanying Huns still refuse to attack Hagen. Etzel, meanwhile, is clueless about these events and welcomes his guests warmly.

Hagen advises the Burgundians to remain armed. Fighting almost breaks out at a tournament when the Burgundian Volker von Alzey kills a Hun in a joust, but Etzel is able to prevent it. Kriemhild then seeks to convince Dietrich von Bern and Hildebrand to attack the Burgundians; they refuse, but Etzel's brother Bloedelin agrees. At the following feast, Kriemhild has her and Etzel's son Ortlieb brought into the hall. Bloedelin then attacks and kills the Burgundian squires outside the feast hall, but is killed by Hagen's brother, Dankwart. When Dankwart, the sole survivor, enters the hall and reports the attack, Hagen beheads Ortlieb, and fighting breaks out within the feast hall itself. The Huns are unarmed and slaughtered, but Dietrich and Hildebrand arrange for Etzel, Kriemhild, Rüdiger, and their own men to exit the hall.

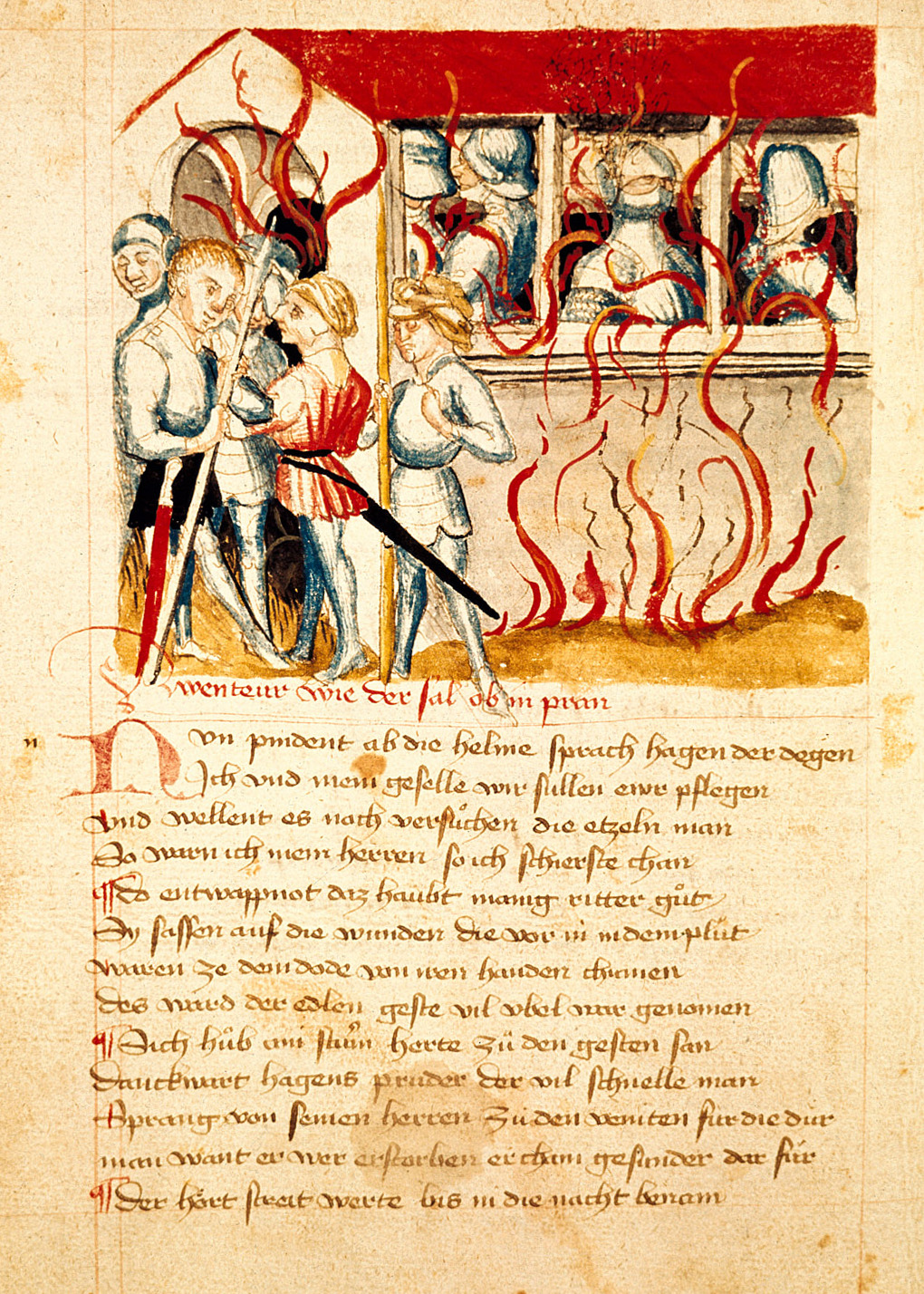
The Huns set fire to Etzel's hall with the Burgundians inside. Illumination from the Hundeshagenscher Codex (mid-15th century).

The Burgundians barricade themselves in the hall, which is besieged by Etzel's warriors. Various Hunnish attempts to attack are repulsed, but a truce cannot be agreed because Kriemhild demands that Hagen be handed over to her. Kriemhild orders the hall set on fire, but the Burgundians survive. The next day, Etzel and Kriemhild force Rüdiger to enter the battle, although he is bound by guest-friendship and kinship to the Burgundians. He fights Gernot and the two kill each other. Rüdiger's death causes Dietrich von Bern's heroes to intervene, although Dietrich has told them not to. The conflict leads to the death of all the Burgundians except Hagen and Gunther, and all of Dietrich's heroes except for his mentor Hildebrand. Dietrich himself now fights and takes Hagen and Gunther prisoner.

Kriemhild demands that Hagen give her back what he has taken from her. He convinces her that he will tell her where Siegfried's hoard is if she first kills Gunther, but afterwards tells her that now she will never learn. Kriemhild kills Hagen with Siegfried's sword. That this great hero has been killed by a woman sickens Etzel, Dietrich, and Hildebrand. Hagen's death so enrages Hildebrand that he kills Kriemhild.

== Authorship and dating ==
The Nibelungenlied, like other Middle High German heroic epics, is anonymous. This anonymity extends to discussions of literature in other Middle High German works: although it is common practice to judge or praise the poems of others, no other poet refers to the author of the Nibelungenlied. Attempts to identify the Nibelungenlied-poet with known authors, such as Bligger von Steinach, to whom a lost epic is attributed by Gottfried von Strassburg, have not found wide acceptance. The poem is nevertheless believed to have had a single author, possibly working in a "Nibelungen workshop" ("Nibelungenwerkstatt") together with the author of the Nibelungenklage. The latter work identifies a "meister Konrad" as the author of an original Latin version of the Nibelungenlied, but this is generally taken for a fiction. Although a single Nibelungenlied-poet is often posited, the degree of variance in the text and its background in an amorphous oral tradition mean that ideas of authorial intention must be applied with caution. It is also possible that there were several poets involved, perhaps under the direction of a single "leader" who could be considered the "Nibelungenlied-poet".

The Nibelungenlied is conventionally dated to around the year 1200. Wolfram von Eschenbach references the cook Rumolt, usually taken to be an invention of the Nibelungenlied-poet, in his romance Parzival (c. 1204/5), thereby providing an upper bound on the date the epic must have been composed. Additionally, the poem's rhyming technique most closely resembles that used between 1190 and 1205. Attempts to show that the poem alludes to various historical events have generally not been convincing.

The current theory of the creation of the poem emphasizes the poet's concentration on the region of Passau: for example, the poem highlights the relatively unimportant figure of Bishop Pilgrim of Passau, and the poet's geographical knowledge appears much more firm in this region than elsewhere. These facts, combined with the dating, have led scholars to believe that Wolfger von Erla, Bishop of Passau (reigned 1191–1204) was the patron of the poem. Wolfger is known to have patronized other literary figures, such as Walther von der Vogelweide and Thomasin von Zirclaere. The attention paid to Bishop Pilgrim, who represents the real historical figure Bishop Pilgrim of Passau, would thus be an indirect homage to Wolfger. Wolfger was, moreover, attempting to establish the sainthood of Pilgrim at the time of the poem's composition, giving an additional reason for his prominence.

Some debate exists as to whether the poem is an entirely new creation or whether there was a previous version. German medievalist Jan-Dirk Müller claims that the poem in its written form is entirely new, although he admits the possibility that an orally transmitted epic with relatively consistent contents could have preceded it. German philologist Elisabeth Lienert, on the other hand, posits an earlier version of the text from around 1150 due to the Nibelungenlied's use of a stanzaic form current around that time (see Form and style).

Whoever the poet may have been, they appear to have had a knowledge of German Minnesang and chivalric romance. The poem's concentration on love (minne) and its depiction of Siegfried as engaging in love service for Kriemhild is in line with courtly romances of the time, with Heinrich von Veldeke's Eneasroman perhaps providing concrete models. Other possible influences are Hartmann von Aue's Iwein and Erec. These courtly elements are described by Jan-Dirk Müller as something of a façade, under which the older heroic ethos of the poem remains. Additionally, the poet seems to have known Latin literature. The role given to Kriemhild in the second (originally first) stanza is suggestive of Helen of Troy, and the poem appears to have taken a number of elements from Vergil's Aeneid. There is some debate as to whether the poet was acquainted with Old French chanson de geste.

== Form and style ==
The language of the Nibelungenlied is characterized by its formulaic nature, a feature of oral poetry, meaning that similar or identical words, epithets, phrases, and even lines can be found in various positions throughout the poem. These elements can be used flexibly for different purposes in the poem. As the Nibelungenlied is generally thought to have been conceived as a written work, these elements are typically taken as signs of "fictive orality" ("fingierte Mündlichkeit") that underscore the connection of the poem to its traditionally oral subject matter.

The Nibelungenlied is written in four-line stanzas. Although no melody has survived for the text, melodies for similar stanzas in other German heroic poems have, so that it is certain that the text was meant to be sung. The stanza consists of three Langzeilen ("long lines"), which consist of three metrical feet, a caesura, and three metrical feet following the caesura. The fourth line adds an additional foot following the caesura, making it longer than the other three and marking the end of the stanza. The final word before the caesura is typically female (a stressed syllable followed by an unstressed syllable), whereas the final word of a line is typical male (a stressed syllable). The lines rhyme in pairs, and occasionally there are internal rhymes between the words at the end of the caesura, as in the first stanza (see Synopsis). Medieval German literature scholar Victor Millet uses the poem's sixth stanza as an example of this metrical form. An acute accent indicates the stressed beat of a metrical foot, and || indicates the caesura:

Ze Wórmez bí dem Ríne || si wónten mít ir kráft.
in díente vón ir lánden || vil stólziu ríterscáft
mit lóbelíchen éren || unz án ir éndes zít.
si stúrben sit jǽmerlíche || von zwéier édelen fróuwen nít.

Many stanzas of the poem are constructed in a much less regular manner. It is likely that the Nibelungenlied cites an oral story-telling tradition in using singable stanzas; however, the longer final line is generally thought to belong to a more refined artistic milieu, as later heroic epics typically use a stanza without this longer final line (the so-called "Hildebrandston"). The stanzaic form of the Nibelungenlied, on the other hand, is shared with the Danubian minnesinger known as Der von Kürenberg who flourished in the 1150s and 1160s. The Nibelungenlied-poet may have been inspired by this lyrical stanza. Their use of the stanza would thus cite an oral story-telling tradition while at the same time creating some distance to it. Philologist Andreas Heusler supposed that the poet had taken some earlier orally transmitted stanzas and added a fourth foot to their final line, as these supposedly older stanzas are characterized by a more archaic vocabulary as well. German medievalist Jan-Dirk Müller notes that while it would be typical of a medieval poet to incorporate lines from other works in their own, no stanza of the Nibelungenlied can be proven to have come from an older poem.

The nature of the stanza creates a structure whereby the narrative progresses in blocks: the first three lines carry the story forward, while the fourth introduces foreshadowing of the disaster at the end or comments on events. The fourth line is thus often the most formulaic of the stanza. Stanzas often seem to have been placed after each other without necessarily being causally or narratively connected; for instance, two consecutive stanzas might portray two different reactions to an event by the same figure. Often, the same reaction is given to multiple figures in different stanzas, so that the impression of collective rather than individual reactions is created. Enjambment between stanzas is very rare. The epic frequently creates multiple motivations for events, some of which may contradict each other. This style of narration also causes the events within the poem to come to a frequent halt, which can last for years within the time portrayed in the poem. The division of the epic into Âventiuren (lit. 'adventures') underlines the disconnect between the various episodes. The connection between the first half of the epic (Siegfried's murder) and the second half (Kriemhild's marriage to Etzel) is especially loose. The epic nevertheless maintains the causal and narrative connection between episodes through the commentary of the narrator, who frequently reminds the poem's audience of the coming catastrophe, while the manner in which the epic is told serves to delay the inevitable disaster. The action becomes more and more intense as the epic nears its end.

== Origins ==
=== Historical origins and development of the saga ===
Behind Nibelungenlied stands a large oral tradition, the so-called Nibelungen saga. This oral tradition, moreover, continued to exist following the composition of the Nibelungenlied, as proven by the Rosengarten zu Worms and Das Lied vom Hürnen Seyfrid, both of which were written later than the Nibelungenlied but contain elements of the saga that are absent in it. These oral traditions have, at least in some cases, a historical core. However, various historical events and figures have been melded together into a single plot in such a way that the original historical context has been lost. The epic, and presumably the oral traditions that provided its material, have transformed historical events into relatively simple narrative schemas that can be compared with other, similar (originally) oral narratives from other cultures. What had originally been political motivations have been "personalized", so that political events are explained through personal preferences, likes, dislikes, and feuds rather than purely by realpolitik. Various historical personages, moreover, appear to be contemporaries in the poem despite not having lived at the same time historically.

The Nibelungen saga also seems to have had an early reception in Scandinavia, so that parallel stories are found among the heroic lays of the Poetic Edda (written down in 1270 but containing at least some much older material) and in the Völsunga saga (written down in the second half of the thirteenth century). While the Norse texts were once usually considered to contain a more original version of the Nibelungen saga, newer scholarship has called this into question and notes that the connections made to Norse mythology and Germanic paganism, such as the semi-divine origin of the Nibelungen hoard, are likely more recent developments that are therefore unique to the Scandinavian tradition. Some elements of the Norse tradition, however, are assuredly older.

The death of the Burgundians finds its origins in the destruction of the historical Burgundian kingdom on the Rhine. This kingdom, under the rule of king Gundaharius, was destroyed by the Roman general Flavius Aetius in 436/437, with survivors resettled in eastern Gaul in a region centered around modern-day Geneva and Lyon (at the time known as Lugdunum). The Lex Burgundionum, codified by the Burgundian king Gundobad at the end of the sixth century, contains many names that can be connected with the Nibelungen saga, including, besides Gundaharius, Gislaharius (Giselher), Gundomaris (possibly the historical figure behind the Old Norse Gothorm, who is replaced by Gernot in the German tradition), and Gibica (attested in Germany as Gibich but not found in the Nibelungenlied). Although the Burgundian kingdom on the Rhine is thus historically attested, the saga locates its destruction at the court of Attila (Etzel), king of the Huns. The destruction of Attila's kingdom itself is likely inspired by Attila's sudden death following his wedding in 453, which was popularly blamed on his wife, a Germanic woman named Hildico. Her name, containing the element hild, may have inspired that of Kriemhild. Kriemhild most likely originally killed Etzel and avenged her relatives rather than her husband, but this change had already taken place some time before the creation of the Nibelungenlied. Jan-Dirk Müller doubts that we can be certain which version is more original given that in both cases Kriemhild brings about the destruction of the Hunnish kingdom. The differences may be because the continental saga is more favorable to Attila than the Norse, and so Attila could not be held directly responsible for the treacherous invitation of the Burgundians.

Unlike the Burgundians, Siegfried cannot be firmly identified with a historical figure. He may have his origins in the Merovingian dynasty, where names beginning with the element Sigi- were common and where there was also a famous and violent queen Brunhilda (543–613). The feud between this historical Brunhilda and the rival queen Fredegund may have provided the origin of the feud between Brünhild and Kriemhild. The name Siegfried itself is a relatively recent one, only being attested from the seventh century onward, meaning that the original name may have been equivalent to the Old Norse Sigurd. Scholars such as Otto Höfler have speculated that Siegfried and his slaying of the dragon may be a mythologized reflection of Arminius and his defeat of the Roman legions in the Battle of the Teutoburg Forest in 9 AD. Jan-Dirk Müller suggests that Siegfried likely has a more mythological origin. The story of the destruction of the Burgundians and Siegfried appear to have been originally unconnected. The Old Norse Atlakviða, a poem likely originally from the ninth century that has been reworked as part of the Poetic Edda, tells the story of the death of the Burgundians without any mention of Sigurd (Siegfried) and can be taken as an attestation for an older tradition. In fact, the earliest attested work to connect Siegfried explicitly with the destruction of the Burgundians is the Nibelungenlied itself, though Old Norse parallels make it clear that this tradition must have existed orally for some time.

=== The Nibelungenlied-poet's reworking of the saga ===
When composing the Nibelungenlied, its poet was faced with setting an oral tradition down into a definitive version although that tradition was by its very nature amorphous. In choosing which elements of the saga to include in his version, the poet therefore often incorporated two versions of an event that were likely not combined in the oral tradition. An example is the beginning of the fighting in Etzel's hall, which is motivated both by an attack on the Burgundians' supplies and Hagen's killing of prince Ortlieb. The Old Norse Thidrekssaga, which is based on German sources, contains only the second element, meaning that the two motivations were likely variants that were hardly ever combined in practice. Victor Millet concludes that the poet deliberately doubles the motivations or occurrences of various events, including Siegfried's wooing of Kriemhild, the deception of Brünhild, Hagen's humiliation of Kriemhild, and Kriemhild's demand for the return of Nibelungen treasure.

The poet also appears to have significantly altered various aspects of the saga. Most significantly, the poet has suppressed the mythological or fantastical elements of Siegfried's story. When these elements are introduced, it is in a retrospective tale narrated by Hagen that reduces the slaying of the dragon to a single stanza. Hagen's story, moreover, does not accord with Siegfried's youth as the narrator of the Nibelungenlied has portrayed it, in which he receives a courtly education in Xanten. More elaborate stories about Siegfried's youth are found in the Thidrekssaga and in the later heroic ballad Das Lied vom Hürnen Seyfrid, both of which appear to preserve German oral traditions about the hero that the Nibelungenlied-poet decided to suppress for their poem.

The portrayal of Kriemhild, particularly in the first half of the romance, as a courtly lady is likely an invention of the Nibelungenlied-poet. Earlier (and many later) attestations of Kriemhild outside of the Nibelungenlied portray her as obsessed with power and highlight her treachery to her brothers rather than her love for her husband as her motivation for betraying them. The poet still uses images from this traditional picture, but given the new motivation of the poem's Kriemhild, their meaning has changed. For instance, when Kriemhild demands that Hagen give back what he has taken from her, a traditional motif known from the Norse versions, she could mean the stolen hoard, but she could also mean her murdered husband. Hagen, similarly, in demanding that Gunther first be killed before he reveals the hoard's location, even though the hoard is at the bottom of the Rhine and cannot be retrieved, reveals Kriemhild's mercilessness while also showing his own duplicity. It is unclear which figure is in the right and which in the wrong.

== Medieval influence and reception ==
With 36 extant manuscripts, the Nibelungenlied appears to have been one of the most popular works of the German Middle Ages and seems to have found a very broad audience. The poem is quoted by Wolfram von Eschenbach in his Parzival and Willehalm and likely inspired his use of stanzas in his unfinished Titurel. The manuscript witnesses and medieval references to the Nibelungenlied show that medieval recipients were most interested in the Nibelungenlied as the story of the destruction of the Burgundians; the first half of the poem was often shortened or otherwise summarized. The Ambraser Heldenbuch titles its copy of the Nibelungenlied with "Ditz Puech heysset Chrimhilt" (this book is named "Kriemhild"), showing that she was seen as the most important character.

The areas of medieval interest seem in particular to have been the inescapability of the slaughter at the end of the poem and Kriemhild and Hagen's culpability or innocence. The earliest attested reception of the Nibelungenlied, the Nibelungenklage, which was likely written only shortly afterwards, shows an attempt both to make sense of the horror of the destruction and to absolve Kriemhild of blame. The C version of the Nibelungenlied, redacted around the same time as the Klage, shows a similar strategy. The presence of the Nibelungenklage in all manuscripts of the Nibelungenlied shows that the ending of the Nibelungenlied itself was evidently unsatisfying to its primary audience without some attempt to explain these two "scandalous" elements. The Rosengarten zu Worms, on the other hand, demonizes Kriemhild thoroughly, while the late-medieval Lied vom Hürnen Seyfrid takes her side even more strongly.

As the first Middle High German heroic poem to be written, the Nibelungenlied can be said to have founded an entire genre of Middle High German literature. As a result, other Middle High German heroic poems are sometimes described as "post-Nibelungian" ("nachnibelungisch"). The majority of these epics revolve around the hero Dietrich von Bern, who plays a secondary role in the Nibelungenlied: it is likely that his presence there inspired these new poems. Many of the following heroic epics appear to respond to aspects of the Nibelungenlied: the Kudrun (c. 1250), for instance, has been described as a reply to the Nibelungenlied that reverses the heroic tragedy of the previous poem. Kudrun herself is sometimes seen as a direct reversal of Kriemhild, as she makes peace among warring factions rather than driving them to their deaths. No Middle High German heroic epic after the Nibelungenlied maintains the tragic heroic atmosphere that characterized earlier Germanic heroic poetry, and the later poems are often further hybridized with elements of chivalric romance.

Reception of the Nibelungenlied ceases after the fifteenth century: the work is last copied in manuscript as part of the Ambraser Heldenbuch around 1508, and its last mention is by the Viennese historian Wolfgang Lazius in two works from 1554 and 1557 respectively. It was not printed and appears to have been forgotten. The Nibelungen saga, however, was not forgotten completely; the Rosengarten zu Worms was printed as part of the printed Heldenbuch until 1590 and inspired several plays in the early seventeenth century, while Hürnen Seyfrid continued to be printed into the nineteenth century in a prose version.

== Modern reception ==
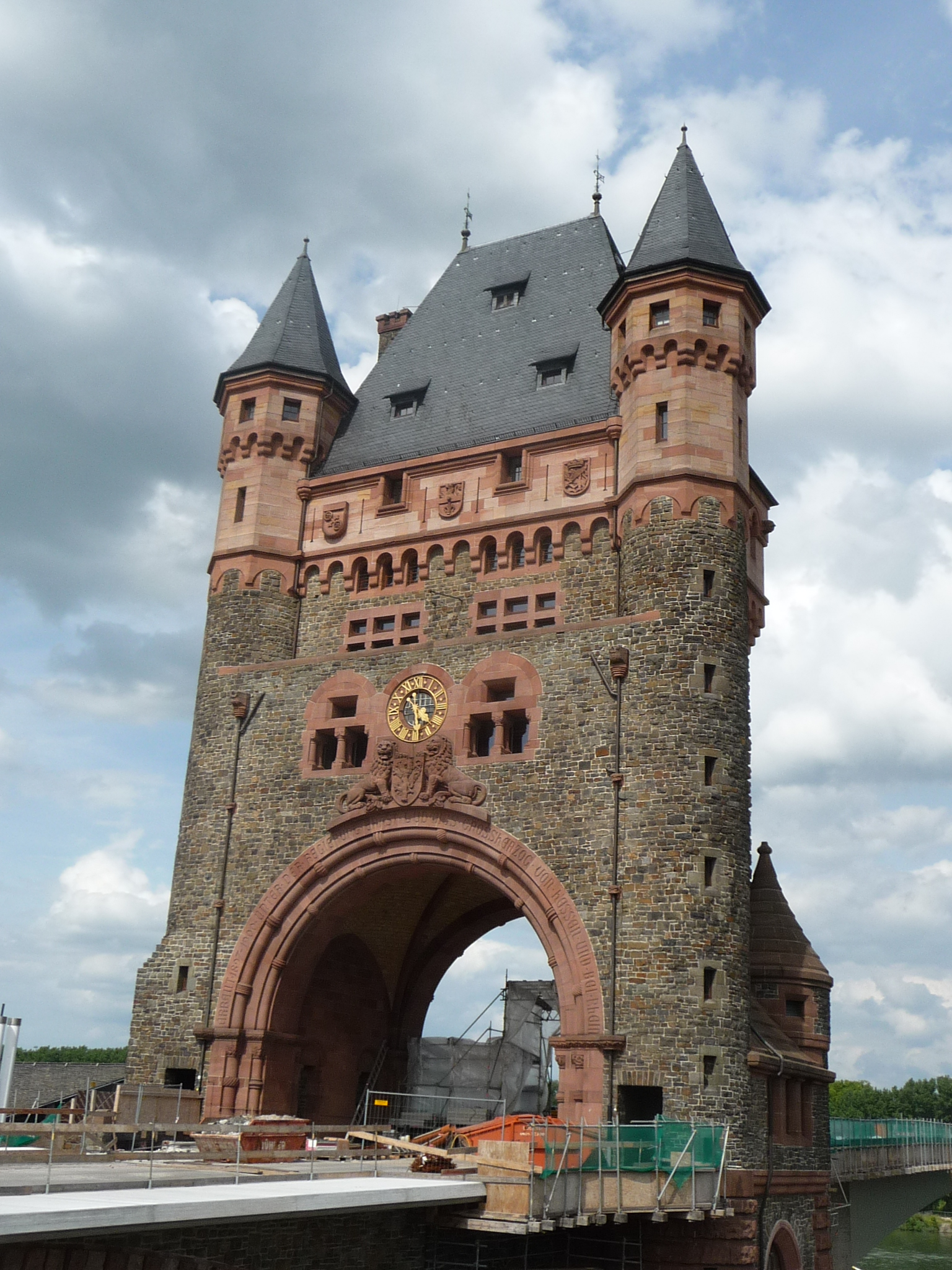
Nibelungenturm (Nibelungen tower) on the Nibelungenbrücke in Worms

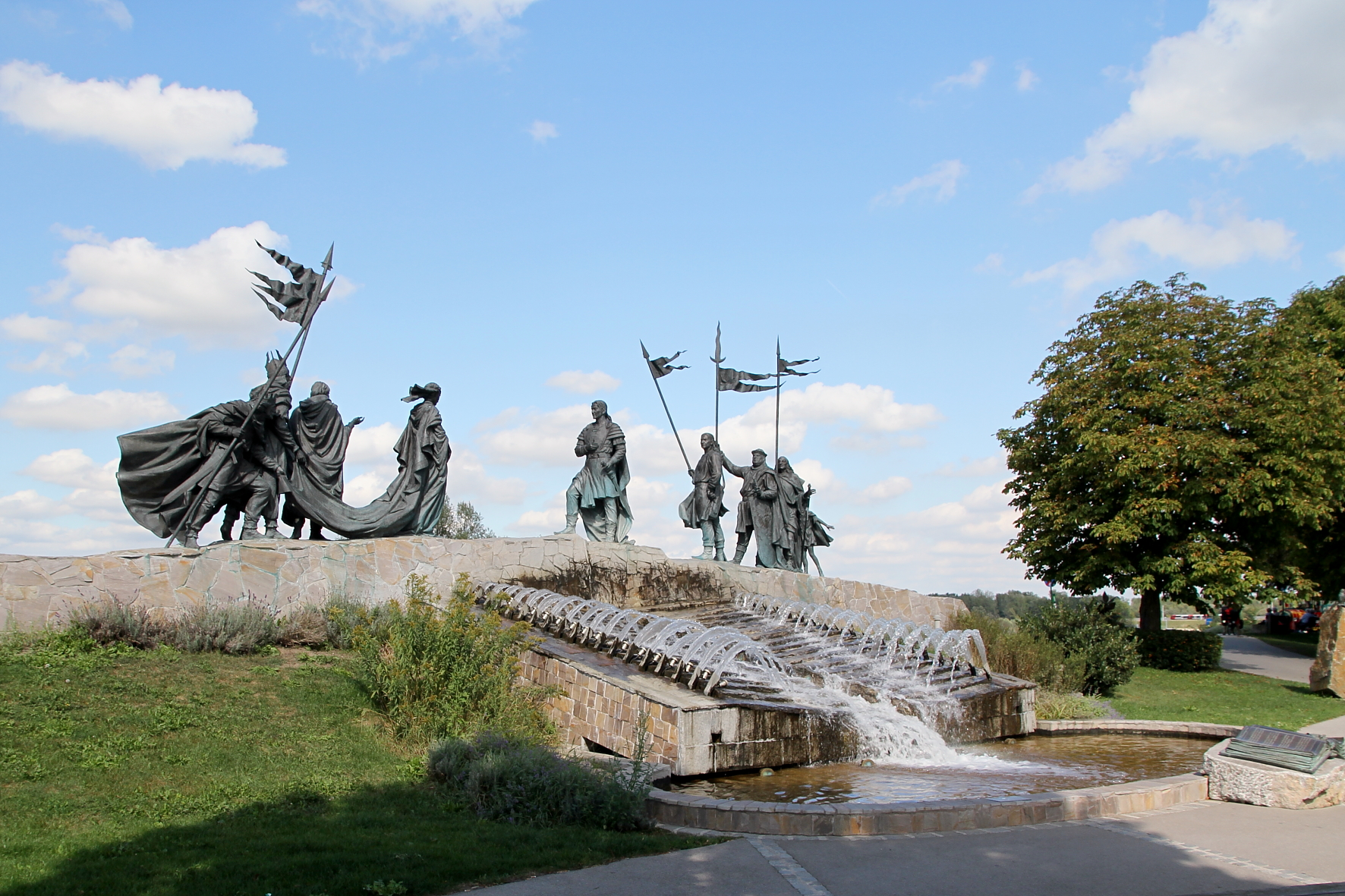
Nibelungen fountain in Tulln an der Donau, Austria (Hans Muhr, 2005), depicting the meeting of Etzel and Kriemhild

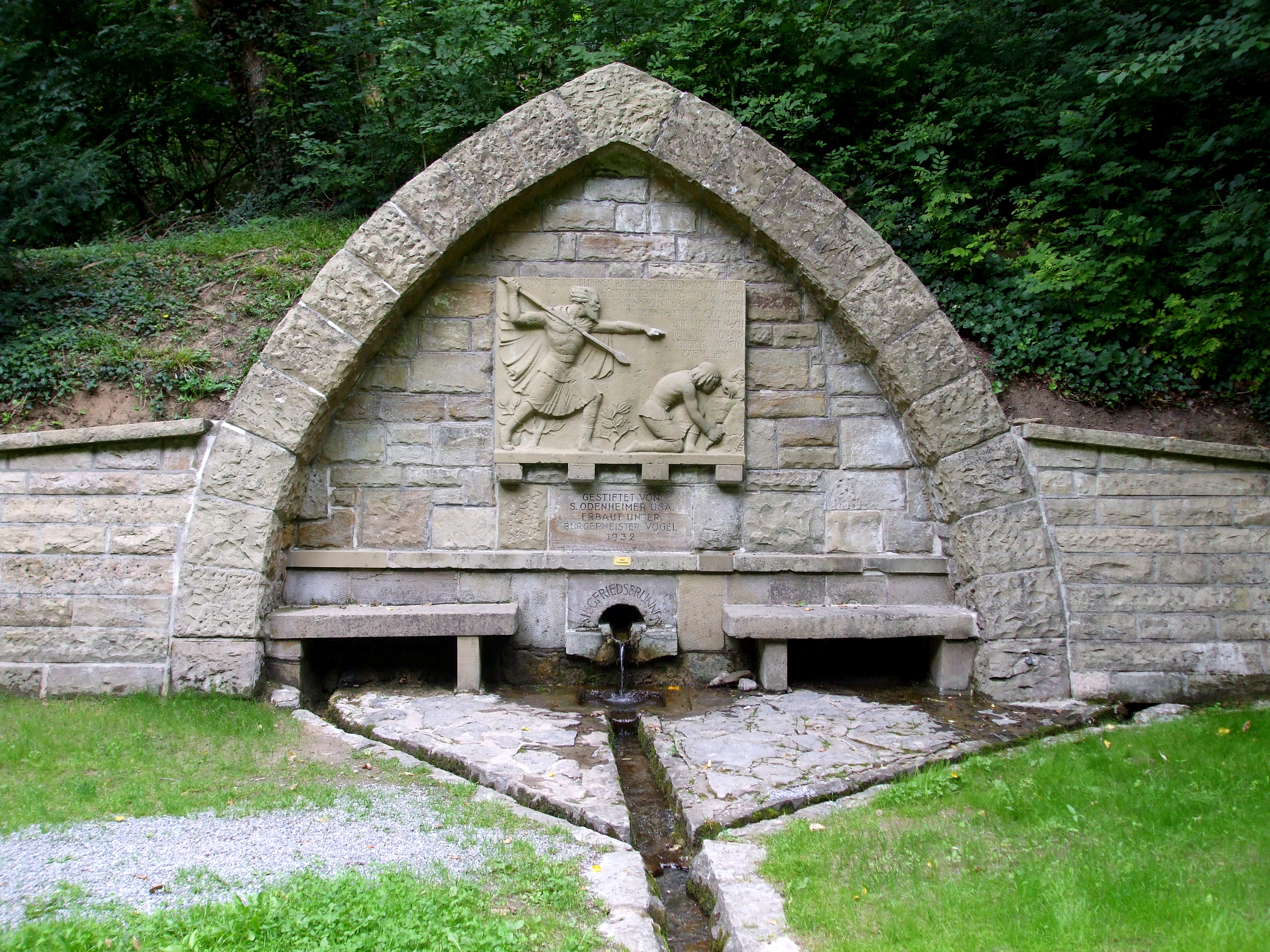
"Siegfriedsbrunnen" in Odenheim, one of several purported identifications of the place of Siegfried's murder in the Odenwald as found in the Nibelungenlied manuscript C

After having been forgotten for two hundred years, the Nibelungenlied manuscript C was rediscovered by Jacob Hermann Obereit in 1755. That same year, Johann Jacob Bodmer publicized the discovery, publishing excerpts and his own reworkings of the poem. Bodmer dubbed the Nibelungenlied the "German Iliad" ("deutsche Ilias"), a comparison that skewed the reception of the poem by comparing it to the poetics of a classical epic. Bodmer attempted to make the Nibelungenlied conform more closely to these principles in his own reworkings of the poem, leaving off the first part in his edition, titled Chriemhilden Rache, in order to imitate the in medias res technique of Homer. He later rewrote the second part in dactylic hexameter under the title Die Rache der Schwester (1767). Bodmer's placement of the Nibelungenlied in the tradition of classical epic had a detrimental effect on its early reception: when presented with a full edition of the medieval poem by Christoph Heinrich Myller, King Frederick II famously called the Nibelungenlied "not worth a shot of powder" ("nicht einen Schuß Pulver werth"). Goethe was similarly unimpressed, and Hegel compared the epic unfavorably to Homer. The epic nevertheless had its supporters, such as August Wilhelm Schlegel, who called it a "great tragedy" ("große Tragödie") in a series of lectures from 1802/3. Many early supporters sought to distance German literature from French Classicism and belonged to artistic movements such as Sturm und Drang.

As a consequence of the comparison of the Nibelungenlied to the Iliad, the Nibelungenlied came to be seen as the German national epic in the earlier nineteenth century, particularly in the context of the Napoleonic Wars. The Nibelungenlied was supposed to embody German bourgeois virtues that the French were seen as lacking. This interpretation of the epic continued during the Biedermeier period, during which the heroic elements of the poem were mostly ignored in favor of those that could more easily be integrated into a bourgeois understanding of German virtue. The translation of the Nibelungenlied by Karl Simrock into modern German in 1827 was especially influential in popularizing the epic and remains influential today. Also notable from this period is the three-part dramatic tragedy Die Nibelungen by Friedrich Hebbel.

Following the founding of the German Empire, recipients began to focus more on the heroic aspects of the poem, with the figure of Siegfried in particular becoming an identifying figure for German nationalism. Especially important for this new understanding of the poem was Richard Wagner's operatic cycle Der Ring des Nibelungen, which, however, was based almost entirely on the Old Norse versions of the Nibelung saga. Wagner's preference for the Old Norse versions followed a popular judgment of the time period: the Nordic versions were seen as being more "original" than the courtly story portrayed in the German poem. In the First World War, the alliance between Germany and Austria-Hungary came to be described as possessing Nibelungen-Treue (Nibelungen loyalty), referring to the loyalty to death between Hagen and the Burgundians. While militaristic, the use of imagery from the Nibelungenlied remained optimistic in this period rather than focusing on the doom at the end of the epic.

The interwar period saw the Nibelungenlied enter the world of cinema in Fritz Lang's two part film Die Nibelungen (1924/1925), which tells the entire story of the poem. At the same time, the Nibelungenlied was heavily employed in anti-democratic propaganda following the defeat of Germany and Austria-Hungary. The epic supposedly showed that the German people were more well suited to a heroic, aristocratic form of life than democracy. The betrayal and murder of Siegfried was explicitly compared to the "stab in the back" that the German army had supposedly received. At the same time, Hagen and his willingness to sacrifice himself and fight to the death made him into a central figure in the reception of the poem. During the Second World War, Hermann Göring would explicitly use this aspect of the Nibelungenlied to celebrate the sacrifice of the German army at Stalingrad and compare the Soviets to Etzel's Asiatic Huns.

Postwar reception and adaptation of the poem, reacting to its misuse by the Nazis, is often parodic. At the same time, the poem continues to play a role in regional culture and history, particularly in Worms and other places mentioned in the Nibelungenlied. Much discussion has centered on whether and how the epic ought to be taught in schools. The material of the Nibelungen saga has continued to inspire new adaptations. These include Die Nibelungen, a German remake of Fritz Lang's film from 1966/67, and the television film Dark Kingdom: The Dragon King from 2004. However, the majority of popular adaptations of the material today in film, computer games, comic books, etc., are not based on the medieval epic directly.

Outside of Germany, most reception of the Nibelungen material has taken place via Wagner, although the epic has been translated into English numerous times.

== Editions and modern German translations ==
(in chronological order)

- Lachmann, Karl, ed. (1826). Der Nibelunge not mit der klage : in der ältesten gestalt (1 ed.). Berlin: G. Reimer.
  - Lachmann, Karl, ed. (1841). Der Nibelunge noth und die klage : nach der ältesten überlieferung (2 ed.). Berlin: G. Reimer.
  - Lachmann, Karl, ed. (1851). Der Nibelunge noth und die klage : nach der ältesten überlieferung (3 ed.). Berlin: G. Reimer.
  - Lachmann, Karl, ed. (1867). Der Nibelunge noth und die klage : nach der ältesten überlieferung (4 (6th print of the text) ed.). Berlin: Georg Reimer. ISBN 9783111209432.
- Das Nibelungenlied. Translated by Karl Bartsch. Leipzig 1867 (Google)
- Das Nibelungenlied. Translated by Karl Simrock. Stuttgart 1868 (Google)
  - Lachmann, Karl, ed. (1877). Der Nibelunge noth und die klage : nach der ältesten überlieferung ((9th print of the text) ed.). Berlin: G. Reimer.
- Das Nibelungenlied in der ältesten Gestalt mit den Veränderungen des gemeinen Textes. Herausgegeben und mit einem Wörterbuch versehen von Adolf Holtzmann. Stuttgart 1857 (Google, Google)
- Karl Bartsch, Der Nibelunge Nôt : mit den Abweichungen von der Nibelunge Liet, den Lesarten sämmtlicher Handschriften und einem Wörterbuche, Leipzig: F. A. Brockhaus, 1870–1880
- Michael S. Batts. Das Nibelungenlied, critical edition, Tübingen: M. Niemeyer 1971. ISBN 3-484-10149-0
- Helmut de Boor. Das Nibelungenlied, 22nd revised and expanded edition, ed. Roswitha Wisniewski, Wiesbaden 1988, ISBN 3-7653-0373-9. This edition is based ultimately on that of Bartsch.
- Ursula Schulze, Das Nibelungenlied, Düsseldorf / Zürich: Artemis & Winkler 2005. ISBN 3-538-06990-5. Based on manuscript C.
- Das Nibelungenlied. Zweisprachig, parallel text, edited and translated by Helmut de Boor. Sammlung Dieterich, 4th edition, Leipzig 1992, ISBN 3-7350-0104-1.
- Bartsch, Karl; Boor, Helmut de, eds. (1997). Das Nibelungenlied. Mhd./Nhd (in German). translated with commentary by Siegfried Grosse. P. Reclam. ISBN 978-3-15-000644-3. - parallel text based on the edition of Karl Bartsch and Helmut de Boor
- Albrecht Behmel, Das Nibelungenlied, translation, Ibidem Verlag, 2nd edition, Stuttgart 2001, ISBN 978-3-89821-145-1
- Hermann Reichert, Das Nibelungenlied, Berlin: de Gruyter 2005. VII, ISBN 3-11-018423-0. Edition of manuscript B, normalized text; introduction in German.
- Walter Kofler (Ed.), Nibelungenlied und Klage. Redaktion I, Stuttgart: Hirzel 2011. ISBN 978-3-7776-2145-6. Manuscript I.
- Walter Kofler (Ed.), Nibelungenlied. Redaktion D, Stuttgart: Hirzel 2012. ISBN 978-3-7776-2297-2. Manuscript D.
- Heinzle, Joachim, ed. (2013). Das Nibelungenlied und die Klage. Nach der Handschrift 857 der Stiftsbibliothek St. Gallen. Mittelhochdeutscher Text, Übersetzung und Kommentar. Berlin: Deutscher Klassiker Verlag. ISBN 978-3-618-66120-7. Text, translation and commentary, based on manuscript B.

== English translations ==
- Armour, Margaret, translator. The Nibelungenlied. Heritage Press, New York, 1961.
- Edwards, Cyril, translator. The Nibelungenlied: The Lay of the Nibelungs. Oxford University Press. 2010. ISBN 978-0-19-923854-5.
- Hatto, Arthur, translator. The Nibelungenlied. Penguin Classics, 1964.
- Horton, Alice, translator. The Lay of the Nibelungs: Metrically Translated from the Old German Text. London: G. Bell and Sons, 1898.
- Lichtenstein, Robert, translator. The Nibelungenlied. (Studies in German Language and Literature Number: 9). Lewiston, New York: Edwin Mellen Press, 1992. ISBN 0-7734-9470-7 ISBN 978-0-7734-9470-1
- Manning, Michael, translator and illustrator. Michael Manning's The Nibelungen. Sum Legio Publishing, 2010. ISBN 978-3-9502635-8-9
- Raffel, Burton, translator. Das Nibelungenlied. New Haven, Connecticut: Yale University Press, 2006. ISBN 978-0-300-11320-4. ISBN 0-300-11320-X
- Ryder, Frank G., translator. The Song of the Nibelungs. Detroit: Wayne State University Press, 1962.
- The Nibelungenlied: with The Klage. Translated by Whobrey, William T. Hackett. 2018. ISBN 978-1-62466-675-9.

== See also ==
- German mythology
- Nibelungs
- Sigurd
- Völsunga saga
- Kudrun
- Der Ring des Nibelungen (Wagner)

== Works cited ==
- Bekker, Hugo (1971). The Nibelungenlied: A Literary Analysis. Toronto: University of Toronto. ISBN 978-0802052353.
- Bumke, Joachim (1996). Die vier Fassungen der "Nibelungenklage". Untersuchungen zur Überlieferungsgeschichte und Textkritik der höfischen Epik im 13. Jahrhundert. Berlin/New York: de Gruyter.
- Curschmann M (1987). "'Nibelungenlied' und 'Klage'". In Ruh K, Keil G, Schröder W (eds.). Die deutsche Literatur des Mittelalters. Verfasserlexikon. Vol. 2. Berlin, New York: Walter De Gruyter. cols 926–969. ISBN 978-3-11-022248-7.
- Garland, Henry; Garland, Mary (1997). "Nibelungenlied". The Oxford Companion to German Literature (3 ed.). Oxford and New York: Oxford University. ISBN 9780191727412.
- Gentry, Francis G.; McConnell, Winder; Müller, Ulrich; Wunderlich, Werner, eds. (2011) [2002]. The Nibelungen Tradition. An Encyclopedia. New York, Abingdon: Routledge. ISBN 978-0-8153-1785-2.
- Handschriftencensus (2018). "Gesamtverzeichnis Autoren/Werke: 'Nibelungenlied'". Handschriftencensus.
- Haymes, Edward R.; Samples, Susan T. (1996). Heroic legends of the North: an introduction to the Nibelung and Dietrich cycles. New York: Garland. pp. 101–111. ISBN 0815300336.
- Heinzle, Joachim (1999). Einführung in die mittelhochdeutsche Dietrichepik. Berlin, New York: De Gruyter. ISBN 3-11-015094-8.
- Heusler, Andreas (1982) [1965]. Nibelungensage und Nibelungenlied. Die Stoffgechichte des Deutschen Heldenepos (6th ed.). Darmstadt: Wissenschaftliche Buchgesellschaft. ISBN 3-534-06960-9.
- Hoffmann, Werner (1974). Mittelhochdeutsche Heldendichtung. Berlin: Erich Schmidt. pp. 69–91. ISBN 3-503-00772-5.
- Lienert, Elisabeth (2015). Mittelhochdeutsche Heldenepik. Berlin: Erich Schmidt. pp. 30–71. ISBN 978-3-503-15573-6.
- McConnell, Winder (1984). The Nibelungenlied. Twayne's world authors. Boston: Twayne. ISBN 978-0805765595.
- McConnell, Winder, ed. (1998). A Companion to the Nibelungenlied. Rochester, NY; Woodbridge, Suffolk: Camden House. ISBN 1-57113-151-5.
- Millet, Victor (2008). Germanische Heldendichtung im Mittelalter. Berlin, New York: de Gruyter. pp. 181–238. ISBN 978-3-11-020102-4.
- Mowatt, D.G.; Sacker, Hugh (1967). The Nibelungenlied: An Interpretative Commentary. Toronto: University of Toronto. ISBN 978-0802051950.
- Müller, Jan-Dirk (1998). Spielregeln für den Untergang: Die Welt des Nibelungenliedes. Tübingen: Niemeyer. ISBN 978-3484107731. English translation: Müller, Jan-Dirk (2007). Rules for the Endgame. The World of the Nibelungenlied. Translated by Whobrey, William T. Tübingen: Johns Hopkins. ISBN 978-0801887024.
- Müller, Jan-Dirk (2009). Das Nibelungenlied (3 ed.). Berlin: Erich Schmidt.
- Müller, Jan-Dirk (2023). Varianz – die Nibelungenfragmente. Überlieferung und Poetik des Nibelungenliedes im Übergang von Mündlichkeit zu Schriftlichkeit. de Gruyter. doi:10.1515/9783110983104. ISBN 9783110983104.
- Nagel, Bert (1970). Das Nibelungenlied. Stoff — Form — Ethos (2nd ed.). Frankfurt/Main: Hirschgraben.
- Reichert, Hermann (2007). Nibelungenlied-Lehrwerk. Sprachlicher Kommentar, mittelhochdeutsche Grammatik, Wörterbuch. Passend zum Text der St. Galler Fassung ("B"). Vienna: Praesens. ISBN 978-3-7069-0445-2.
- UNESCO (2009). "Song of the Nibelungs, a heroic poem from mediaeval Europe". Memory of the World Register.
- Weber, Gottfried; Hoffmann, Werner (1974). Nibelungenlied. Sammlung Metzler, 7 (4th ed.). Stuttgart: Metzler. ISBN 3-476-14007-5.
