= Klage =

Klage can refer to:

- German poem or song expressing grief; lament or dirge
- The Nibelungenklage, a Middle High German heroic poem
- Diu Klage, a Middle High German poem by Hartmann von Aue, also called Das Büchlein.
