= Lied vom Hürnen Seyfrid =

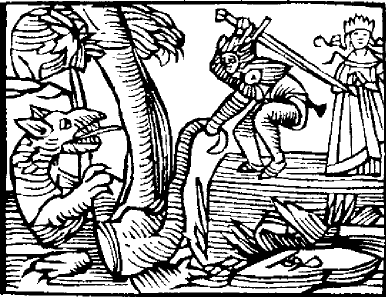
Siegfried cuts the dragon in half while Kriemhild watches. Woodcut from an early modern printing of Hürnen Seyfrid.

Das Lied vom Hürnen Seyfrid ("The Song of Horn-skinned Siegfried"; "Lay of Seyfrid with the Horny Skin" (Note: Or "Lay of Siegfried with the Horny Skin")), or Hürnen Seyfrid for short, is an anonymous Early New High German heroic ballad. The poem concerns the adventures of young Siegfried, hero of the Nibelungenlied and an important figure in Germanic heroic legend. It preserves traditions about Siegfried that are otherwise only known from Old Norse sources and thus attest their existence in oral traditions about Siegfried that circulated outside of the Nibelungenlied in Germany.

Hürnen Seyfrid tells how Siegfried was raised by a smith, killed a dragon, and made his skin invincible (got his skin as hard as horn (hürnen)). Afterwards it tells how he rescued Kriemhild, daughter of the Burgundian king Gybich, with the help of the dwarf Eugel from a cursed man who has transformed into a dragon. In doing so, Siegfried fights the giant Kuperan. In defeating the dragon, Siegfried acquires the treasure of the Nibelungen and marries Kriemhild.

External evidence indicates that Seyfrid likely dates to around 1400, but the exact period of composition is unknown as the poem only survives in printings and a single manuscript fragment from after 1500. The poem, together with another heroic ballad, the Jüngeres Hildebrandslied, is the piece of German heroic tradition that remained popular the longest and the only part of the tradition surrounding the Nibelungenlied to enter early print culture. The poem was re-printed into the eighteenth century, and a prose version continued to be re-printed into the nineteenth century.

== Summary ==
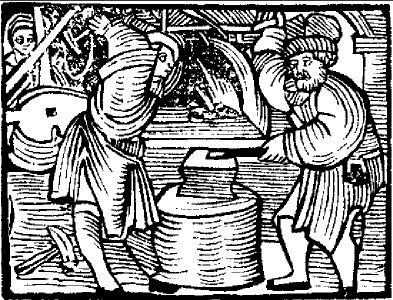
Siegfried breaks the smith's anvil in two.

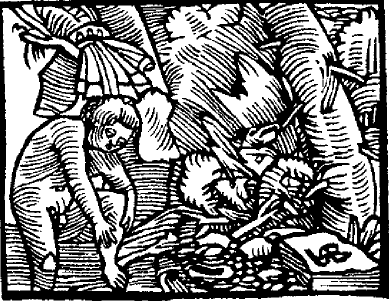
Siegfried covers himself with the dragons' molten skin except between his shoulders.

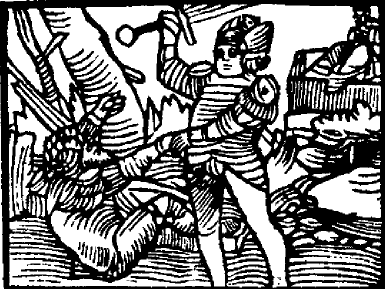
The giant Kuperan betrays Siegfried and attacks him.

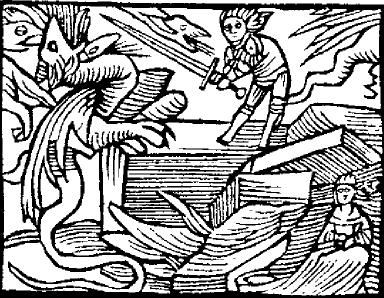
Siegfried fights to save Kriemhild from the dragon.

Seyfrid (or Sewfrid), (Note: The form of the hero's name depends on the printing.) son of king Sigmund, is sent away from his father's court due to his bad behavior. He comes across a smith in a village who takes him as his apprentice, but Seyfrid destroys the anvil with his sword and abuses the other apprentices and the smith himself. The smith therefore sends Seyfrid to a lone linden tree under the pretense that the boy will meet a charcoal burner there. In reality, the smith has sent Seyfrid to the linden tree because a dragon lives next to it, and the smith hopes that the dragon will kill the boy. Seyfrid, however, kills the dragon easily and then, looking for the charcoal burner, wanders into a forest where he encounters many dragons in a clearing. Seyfrid rips up trees and throws them at the dragons, trapping them. He finally finds the charcoal burner, and with his help he lights the trees over the dragons, killing them. Their horned (that is, impenetrable) skin melts from the heat and flows as a small stream. Seyfrid sticks his finger into it and realizes that it causes his own skin to harden, so he smears the molten horned-skin over himself, covering everywhere except between his shoulder blades. Later, the poem tells us, Seyfrid will go to the court of King Gybich in Worms, to marry Gybich's daughter Kriemhild. He will also find the treasure that Nibelung, king of the dwarfs, had hidden away in a mountain for his sons. Because of this treasure there was a great slaughter among the Huns, which only Dietrich von Bern and Hildebrand survived.

=== Dragon abducts Kriemhild ===
In Worms, meanwhile, king Gybich rules with his three sons Gunther, Gyrnot, and Hagen, along with his daughter Kriemhild. One day a dragon appears, seizes the girl and flies away with her (to its lair, in the "rock" or mountain). The dragon does not mistreat Kriemhild, however, laying his head in her lap. On the Easter after four years of captivity, the dragons transforms into a man's shape for a day, and describes her lot. He will never grant permission for her to see her family again, and he will keep her by his side in dragon-form for another five years, after which the curse on him will break and he will regain the form of a handsome youth. After this he shall deflower her and make her his bride, taking her away with him to hell.

=== Seyfrid at dragon's rock ===
In this passage, Seyfrid reaches the dragon's rock ("Mt. Trachenstein", (Note: It has been speculated that this may refer to the hill called Drachenfels near Bad Dürkheim. However, note that in the first instance, it is written as Trachen stayn, which is less suggestive of a proper name of a mountain. Later passages give Trachenstayne In modern German: Drachenstein.) or the "Drachenstein" (Note: Note that Dippold probably does not regard Drachenstein as the whole mountain. He writes that the dwarfs brought the treasure out of their dwelling in "the bowels of the mountain" to Drachenstein.)), and learns of Kriemhild being held hostage, and seeks to rescue her with the aid of the dwarf Eugel and the unwilling and traitorous giant Kuperan.

Gybich, meanwhile, has sent messengers out to search for his daughter. Seyfrid is out hunting one day comes upon the "dragon's rock". He follows it, but when he finally sees the dragon he is afraid and wants to run away. But Eugel, king of the dwarfs, now appears and addresses Seyfrid with his own name. Seyfrid, realizing that Eugel knows something about him, asks Eugel for the name of his parents, whom he has forgotten. The dwarf causes him to remember and also tells him about the dragon and Kriemhild. Seyfrid then decides to fight; Eugel tries to dissuade him, but Seyfrid forces the dwarf to help him. Eugel tells him that the giant Kuperan lives nearby, who has the key to the mountain. Kuperan and Seyfrid fight, but Seyfrid wounds the giant, whom he spares in exchange for help freeing Kriemhild. Yet while they are riding through the forest, Kuperan attacks Seyfrid, knocking him unconscious. Eugel covers Seyfrid with his cloak of invisibility to save him until Seyfrid regains consciousness. Seyfrid then attacks Kuperan and wants to kill him, but spares him so that the giant can guide the way to enter the mountain, that is, the two of them go inside the mountain wall, through the locked door which was hidden 8 klafters below ground. Seyfrid finds Kriemhild and converses with her, but he would have to defeat the dragon to complete the rescues, and she is not sure he is equal to the task. But by a stroke of luck, the treacherous giant Kuperan tells him that nearby there is stored a mighty sword, the only one which is capable of defeating the dragon. Kuperan then attacks Seyfrid disloyally for the third time after crying mercy, but now that Seyfrid has found the hostage, he feels no need to spare the giant and pushes the giant off the mountain rock, shattering it to a hundred pieces.

=== Seyfrid's combat with dragon ===
In this passage, Seyfrid defeats the dragon and saves Kriemhild; he also discovers Nyblung's treasure hoard and claims it, thinking it to be rightful spoils of victory confiscated from the dragon; after learning his short-lived fate, he dumps the treasure into the Rhine.

Seyfrid has eaten nothing for four days, and Eugel (who must have tagged along "in between") summons his dwarfs to bring sumptuous food. Just now the dragon returns. It is revealed the man had turned into a dragon because of a woman's curse in a lovers' quarrel, and he was being possessed by the devil. And after the five years the curse would expire (the alternative interpretation is that sequestering a virgin for five years is the required recipe for breaking the curse) and the dragon should regain human form. The dragon is enraged to see Seyfrid trying to liberate the princess it had been grooming for so long, and spits fire all around. However Seyfrid and princess take refuge in the hole that runs deep down inside the "dragon's rock". Seyfrid obtains the dragon's sword off the rock (probably the sword Balmunc mentioned in other works), whose location Kuperan had disclosed, and emerges from the hole, but his shield is torn by the blow of the dragon.

The poem's attention turns to the treasure of the dwarfs (the so-called Nibelung hoard). The monster's attack frightens the two sons of Nybling [=Nibelung] (another son being Eugel) to transport the treasure and hide it in the wall of the cave-hole, and as already foreshadowed, Seyfrid will find and obtain the treasure.

The poem intertwines here Seyfrid's combat with the dragon. Seyfrid had to flee from the "blue and red" flames spit by the elder dragon, and hide until the heat cooled off. and in the side-hole of his refuge finds the treasure. Though the dragon was accompanied by sixty pup dragons, all venomous, they fell off and flew back whence they came. The dragon attempts to snag with its tail and hurl its foe to the depths. Seyfrid tenderizes the dragon's horny skin with sword blows, perhaps further soften by the heat of the dragon's breath, the horny layer melts off, and Seyfrid cleaves the dragon in two, knocking one half tumbling to the depths so it shatters into smithereens. The other half the hero shoves away.

Seyfrid falls unconscious, and when he awakens, he finds that Kriemhild too has passed out. Eugel revives her with an herb. The dwarf then thanks Seyfrid for freeing the dwarfs from Kuperan and brings him to his kingdom. Seyfrid asks Eugel to tell him his future: the dwarf responds that Seyfrid will be murdered in eight years, but Kriemhild will avenge him. On his way out of the mountain Seyfrid takes the treasure as rightfully conquered from the dragon (though he was mistaken and the treasure belonged to the dwarfs). As Seyfrid approaches Worms he thinks how little use the treasure will be to him as he will soon die, and dumps it into the Rhine.

=== Epilogue: Marriage ===
Seyfrid is well received in Worms and marries Kriemhild, ruling together with Gybich's children, but soon Kriemhild's brothers begin to hate him and later on they kill him at a spring. The ballad ends by stating that anyone who wishes to learn more should read "Seyfrid's Wedding (Seyfrides hochzeit)". (Note: This may be a lost poem whose content is somewhat preserved in Nibelungenlied, or may actually be referring to the Nibelungenlied itself.)

== Origins, transmission, and dating ==
An exact dating of the composition of the Hürnen Seyfrid is impossible given the evidence. The current form of the poem likely came into being around 1500, possibly in Nuremberg. It is possible that the poem already existed around 1400, however, as version m of the Nibelungenlied appears to incorporate details from Hürnen Seyfrid. The Nibelungenlied n also references details from the poem, as do a version of the Rosengarten zu Worms and of Ortnit. A single manuscript fragment of Hürnen Seyfrid is known: discovered in 1996 in the National Archives of Sweden, it likely dates to around 1550. Twelve printed editions of Hürnen Seyfrid are known from the sixteenth and seventeenth centuries. The earliest is from 1530, but it is possible that it was not the first. In 1561 the text was reworked stylistically, and this is the version that was found in later printings. Many of the editions feature woodcuts. (Note: There are quotations in Melchior Goldast Paraeneticorum veterum pars I (1604) as well as in the writings of Lutheran pastor Cyriacus Spangenberg, Der ander Teil des Adelsspiegels (1594) supposedly from the work entitled Siegfried von Horn, and these carry slightly different readings from the known printed text, but it is suspected they are merely redactions rather than reworkings or adaptations.) Additionally, other printings are known to have existed but are now lost.

The poem was rewritten as the prose Gehörnte Siegfried (exact full title uncertain) with a lost edition of 1657 known to have been printed in Hamburg. (Note: The substantiation of the date, written as "zu Hamburg Anno 57" occurs on N 6 recto of the printed Ritter Löwhardus (discussed further below).) The earliest edition of this prose (Volksbuch) edition is the Eine wunderschöne Historie Von dem gehörnten Siegfried (Braunschweig and Leipzig. 1726). (Note: This 1726 edition is transcribed and edited, with the title page and "Braunschweig und Leipzig, 1726" colophon, is appended in Golther (1911), pp. 61–99 This same title appears in the ca. 1750 edition, digital editions at SLUB Dresden and Münchener DigitalisierungsZentrum (the latter mistranscribes title as "Die~". Flood employs the title Historia von dem gehörnten Siegfried.) The prose version changes the queen's name from Kriemhild, Florigunda, altering all the names except Siegrfried's. In a major departure from the lay, the printed version concludes with the widow Florigunda (=Kriemhild) and Seyfrid's surviving son taking refuge with Sieghardus (=Sigmund). Sieghardus is then responsible for taking revenge on Seyfrid's murderers. This prose Seyfried version continued to be re-printed into the nineteenth century.

The end of the prose text alludes to the story of Seyfrid's son Löwhardus (or Löwhard) by Florigunda, and a single copy of Ritter Louhardus from the printer Martha Hertz in Erfurt survives, tentatively dated to 1665, though others give a range around the early 1660s or earlier (Note: Dick 1986, p. 55 and Dick (2011) [2002].) while the range 1661–1667 is given by others. The name changes in prose Siegfried are more or less reflected in this sequel, and Löwhardus represents a change from Sîfrît's son Günther in the Nibelungenlied.

== Relationship to the Nibelungenlied and oral tradition ==
Hürnen Seyfrid features numerous details that are known from the Nordic traditions about Sigurd but are absent in the Nibelungenlied. Among these are that Hagen is one of the sons of Gybich, as he is in the Nordic poems Atlakviða and the Thidrekssaga, that Gybich is the name of the king of Worms rather than Dancrat as in the Nibelungenlied, that Siegfried is raised by a smith who tries to have him killed by a dragon, and the presence of a dragon who has transformed from being a man. This is generally taken to mean that the poet had access to an oral tradition outside of the Nibelungenlied which featured these elements. The poet of the Nibelungenlied, on the other hand, seems to have deliberately suppressed many elements that appear in Hürnen Seyfrid, with reports on Siegfried's killing of the dragon and his invincibility mentioned only very briefly and in retrospect.

The folk etymology of lindworm as "linden tree dragon" is present in both the Seyfrid lay and the Nibelungenlied; in the latter, Siegfried's vulnerable spot is caused by a linden leaf fallen between his shoulders.

== Metrical Form ==
Hürnen Seyfrid is written in the so-called "Hildebrandston", named after its use in the Jüngeres Hildebrandslied that had an accompanying melody. The four line stanza consists of four "Langzeilen" or "long lines", each divided bya a caesura into hemistichs, each hemistich being three metrical feet long (having three stresses). Thus it is similar to the Nibelungenstrophe only simplified, since the scheme used by the Nibelungenlied adds an extra stress on the final (8th) hemistich. The long lines rhyme in couplets (rhyme scheme AABB), with occasional rhymes occurring in the hemistiches(XX). In the printed versions of Hürnen Seyfrid, the hemistichs are printed as individual lines, producing an eight-line stanza.

An example is the first stanza of the 1642 edition:

Es saß im Niderlande/ x
Ein König so wol bekandt/ a
Mit grosser Macht vnnd Gewalte x
Sigmund ward er genand/ a
Der hät mit seiner Frawen/ x
Ein Sohn/ der heist Säwfried/ b
Deß Wesen werd jhr hören/ x
Allhie in diesem Lied. b

== Aesthetic quality and popular success ==
Scholars frequently decry Hürnen Seyfrid's artistic deficiencies: the plot has many inconsistencies and the verse is of low quality. The poem appears to have been haphazardly put together from various parts. The poem does not problematize any of Siegfried's actions and has a deeply Christian background in which Siegfried represents good and the giants and dragons represent evil. Despite these modern complaints, the poem was very popular and the longest-lasting representative of the heroic tradition in Germany. Víctor Millet notes that this poem was the first chance many Early Modern Period readers had ever gotten to read about the adventures of the famous hero Siegfried, as the Nibelungenlied itself never got printed during this (incunabula to post-incunabula) period. Effectively, the more exciting and less intellectually complicated Hürnen Seyfrid seems to have replaced the Nibelungenlied. Werner Hoffmann suggests that Hürnen Seyfrid's popularity in the Early Modern Period may owe some to its quality as exciting escapist fiction at a time when the Holy Roman Empire was rocked by repeated political instability and religious conflict.

The poem's success led to it being translated into other genres: Hans Sachs wrote a tragedy in seven acts in 1557 called Der hürnen Seufrid, which also featured elements from the Rosengarten zu Worms and the printed Heldenbuch. In 1615, the poem was translated into Czech, in 1641 into Dutch.

== Editions ==
- Claußnitzer, Maike; Sperl, Kassandra, eds. (2019). Das Lied vom Hürnen Seyfrid. Stuttgart: S. Hirzel Verlag. ISBN 978-3-7776-2741-0.
- Dick, Ernst S., ed. (2003). Ritter Löwhardus. Weidler. ISBN 9783896932228.
- Golther, Wolfgang, ed. (1889). Das Lied vom Hürnen Seyfrid nach der Druckredaktion des 16. Jahrhunderts. Mit einem Anhange Das Volksbuch vom gehörnten Siegfried nach der ältesten Ausgabe (1726). Halle: Niemeyer.
  - Golther, Wolfgang, ed. (1911) [1889]. Das Lied vom Hürnen Seyfrid nach der Druckredaktion des 16. Jahrhunderts. Mit einem Anhange Das Volksbuch vom gehörnten Siegfried nach der ältesten Ausgabe (1726) (2 ed.). Halle: Niemeyer. hdl:2027/uva.x030375703.
- King, Kenneth Charles, ed. (1958). Das Lied vom Hürnen Seyfrid. Critical Edition with introduction and notes. Manchester: Manchester University.
- Santoro, Verio, ed. (2003). La ricezione della materia Nibelungica tra Medioevo ed Età moderna: Der hürnen Seyfrid. Salerno: Laveglia. ISBN 88-88773-04-5..

== Translations ==
- Magee, Elizabeth (2004). Legends of the Ring. London: The Folio Society. Pages 616-637
