= Helmut de Boor =

German medievalist (1891–1976)

Helmut de Boor (born 24 March 1891 in Bonn, died 4 August 1976 in Berlin) was a German medievalist.

== Life and career ==
Helmut de Boor was the third child of the Byzantine studies scholar Carl Gotthard de Boor. He was educated in Breslau and attended the Universities of Freiburg, Marburg and Leipzig. He earned his doctorate from Leipzig in 1914 and following service in World War I, his Habilitation from the University of Breslau in 1919, in German studies, Old Norse and Philology. Both his dissertation and his Habilitationsschrift are on the Faroese ballads which relate to the Nibelungenlied, which he was later to edit.

While working on his Habilitation, he was a tutor in Old Norse at Breslau. He then held academic positions in German Studies at the University of Gothenburg (1919–22), Old Norse at the University of Greifswald (1924–26), and Old Norse at Leipzig (1926–30). From 1930 to 1945, he was professor of German Language and Literature at the University of Bern.

After World War II, he became professor of German Language and Literature at Marburg (1945–49), and then held the chair in Older German Language and Literature and Old Norse at the Free University of Berlin until 1958/59, when he retired.

De Boor was a very productive scholar. He revised Karl Bartsch's standard edition of the Nibelungenlied and co-wrote a widely used grammar of Middle High German, but throughout his career occupied himself with the philology of Old Norse as well as of German. He wrote above all about heroic literature. After leaving Switzerland he began work on a complete history of German literature, originally intended as a short handbook for student use; it became a multi-volume work of which he wrote only the first three volumes, dealing with the early Middle Ages and Middle High German poetry.

=== Under the Nazis ===
De Boor became a member of the Nazi Party in 1937. He regarded Nazism as a natural reaction of the younger generation in Germany which had been most heavily affected by the aftermath of World War I. He was collegial with Jewish faculty at Bern and initially his closest friend there was Fritz Strich, a Jewish scholar, who however cut off contact with him in 1934 on suspicion that de Boor had told his daughter to boycott Strich's lectures on anti-semitic grounds. He travelled frequently to Germany and after the Anschluß also to Austria to lecture on Germanentum. He sent a paper to Thomas Mann advocating a Germanic religion based on 'kinship and law'. Neighbours complained about his entertaining large numbers of young Germans at his home who were not all students, flying the swastika, and driving an ostentatious red and orange car paid for by the German embassy. In 1944 he was awarded the War Merit Cross, apparently for his services racially vetting Germans invited to speak in Switzerland. A file containing his reports on the politics of his university colleagues was found in the furnace room at the embassy in 1945. In December 1945, effective early the following year, he was expelled from Switzerland despite protests from students, colleagues, and acquaintances.

== Personal life ==
In 1920 de Boor married Ellen von Unwerth, widowed daughter of Theodor Siebs.

== Selected publications ==
- Die färöischen Lieder des Nibelungenzyklus. (dissertation, 1914, published 1918)
- Die färöischen Dvörgamoylieder. (Habilitationsschrift, 1919)
- Schwedische Literatur. Breslau 1924.
- "Die religiöse Sprache der Vǫluspá und verwandter Denkmäler". (1930)
- Das Attilabild in Geschichte, Legende und heroischer Dichtung. Bern 1932.
- "Zum Althochdeutschen Wortschatz auf dem Gebiet der Weissagung". (1944)
- "Die nordischen, englischen und deutschen Darstellungen des Afpelschussmotivs". (1947)
- (with Roswitha Wisniewski) Mittelhochdeutsche Grammatik. Berlin 1956.
- Geschichte der deutschen Literatur von den Anfängen bis zur Gegenwart. Volumes 1–3. Munich 1949–1962.
- (Ed.) Das Nibelungenlied. Ed. Karl Bartsch. 10th and 11th revised editions, 1940, 1949.
