= Nibelungenklage =

Middle High German heroic poem

Die Nibelungenklage or Die Klage (English: the lament; Middle High German: Diu Klage) is an anonymous Middle High German heroic poem. The poem describes the laments for and burial of the dead from the Nibelungenlied, as well as the spread of the news of the catastrophe that ended the other poem, and the fates of the various characters who survived. It was likely written at around the same time as the Nibelungenlied (c. 1200), and is appended to it as though it were another episode (âventiure).

== Summary ==
The poem begins with a long lamentation by the narrator about the events of the Nibelungenlied, followed by a summary of the events of the earlier poems. This includes a genealogy of the main characters and their relationships to each other. Then Siegfried's marriage to Kriemhild, his murder, and the revenge of his widow are recounted. The narrator asserts that Kriemhild is innocent because she was motivated by her love to her dead husband, whereas her relatives the Burgundians needed to be punished. He further asserts that if it had been possible, Kriemhild would have only killed Hagen. If, the narrator continues, Kriemhild had revealed her plan, then the slaughter in Etzel's hall could have been avoided. The narrator then lists the dead, emphasizing that Giselher is innocent and Gunther is partially innocent. The Hunnish prince Ortlieb is lamented as well as Kriemhild by the Huns.

The survivors begin to recover the dead, with every corpse causing great lamenting by relatives and friends. Dietrich von Bern and Etzel remain horrified and insist that everything would have been different if only they had known or avoided one thing or another. There are so many corpses that there are not enough men at Etzel's court to disarm them, women have to help. Hildebrand faints from sorrow when he finds Rüdiger's corpse, and Etzel has to revive him. Etzel then collapses himself. Once all of the dead have been removed, Etzel comes to and laments at length, expressing his despair and his desire to leave the world.

Etzel then sends the minstrel Swemmel as a messenger to Worms via Bechelaren, Rüdiger's home. Even though Swemmel is not to say anything before he reaches Worms, his grief is easily spotted. Rüdiger's wife Gotelind and his daughter Dietlind quickly realize that something has happened to Rüdiger, and so Swemmel tells them the story. In Passau, the messenger informs Bishop Pilgrim, who is related to the Burgundian kings. Pilgrim orders a requiem mass sung and asks the messengers to return to Passau so that he can have everything that's happened written down. Pilgrim also asks other eyewitnesses at Etzel's court for information. Swemmel finally reaches Worms and reports to Brünhild and the court, where the lamentations are very great. The mother of the Burgundians, Ute, dies of grief. After a time of mourning Brünhild's son Siegfried is crowned the new king of the Burgundians.

Meanwhile, Dietrich and Hildebrand decide to return to Dietrich's kingdom in northern Italy. Etzel remains alone in his despair, and the narrator asserts that he does not know what happened to the Hunnish king. The narrator asserts that there are several rumors about Etzel's fate. Dietrich arrives in Bechelaren to discover that Rüdiger's widow Gotelind has died of grief, but Dietrich promises to find Dietlind a new husband once he has returned to Italy. In an epilogue, it is explained that Bishop Pilgrim ordered the events of the Nibelungenlied and the Klage to be written down in Latin by a "meister Konrad", from which it has since been translated to German.

== Origins ==
The Klage is transmitted together with the Nibelungenlied in all but two manuscripts and is appended to the end as if it were a final episode. The poem was likely composed in the same context as the Nibelungenlied, according to the prevailing theory by Joachim Bumke this was in a sort of "Nibelungen workshop" ("Nibelungenwerkstatt") in Passau around 1200, under the auspices of Bishop Wolfger von Erla. This theory is complicated by the fact that the end of the Nibelungenlied clearly does not envision the Klage, meaning it cannot have been planned from the beginning of that epic's composition. According to Jan-Dirk Müller, the only thing that can be said for certain about the Klage's composition relative to the Nibelungenlied is that it took place before very early in the manuscript transmission of the latter work. Although the poem seems to have been written in close proximity to the Nibelungenlied, stylistic and linguistic differences make it clear that it was not written by the same author.

Although the beginning of the Klage emphasizes that it is the beginning of a new work, the layout of the manuscripts presents it as a mere continuation of the Nibelungenlied. Due to deviations from the Nibelungenlied in the Klage's recapitulation of the events of that poem, older scholarship sometimes supposed that the two works had been written independently of each other or even that the Klage was the earlier of the two. Müller prefers to see the Klage as reacting to the oral tradition behind the Nibelungenlied in many respects rather than to the specific version offered by the poem.

According to the Klage itself, a Latin version of the events of the Klage and Nibelungenlied was written down by a certain "meister Konrad" on behalf of Bishop Pilgrim of Passau immediately after the events of the poem. There is no evidence for the existence of a Latin version and so this is usually taken as a narrative fiction. Pilgrim appears to be inspired by the historical figure of Pilgrim of Passau (flourished 971-991), who was an important ecclesiastical prince and whose family shows possible connections to the Nibelung material in its use of names from the Nibelung tradition. It is possible that Pilgrim is made to be the original source of the poem as an oblique reference to Wolfger von Erla. The overall purpose of this claim for a Latin version based on eye-witness accounts seems to be to vouch for the authenticity of the tradition and of the poem, while also providing it with the dignity of the learned language Latin. It may also seek to make the story seem plausible and believable in some way.

== Form and style ==
The Klage is written in rhyming couplets, rather than the stanzas of the Nibelungenlied. The rhyming technique is nevertheless very similar to that of the Nibelungenlied, however the language is much simpler and can even be described as monotonous. The poem nevertheless makes use of shocking metaphors and images to describe the nature of death and the piles of the dead from the previous poem. It is generally viewed as an inferior work when compared with the Nibelungenlied.

== Interpretation ==
The Klage is widely viewed as an attempt to come to terms with the finality of the tragedy that closes the Nibelungenlied. The poem is unique as regards its genre, as it consists more of a commentary on another poem than as a narrative. The title Klage could be a translation of the Latin planctus, coming from the notion that after a tragedy follows a cathartic lament. The use of rhyming couplets and the general tendency of the work is most similar to a poem relaying historical events, as various elements similar to courtly romance found in the Nibelungenlied are not included in the Klage. The Klage offers a specific interpretation of the events of the Nibelungenlied, which it accomplishes by commenting on the plot of the other poem in laments, reports, and recapitulations of events, both in the voice of the narrator and of the characters of the poem. The narrator makes clear distinctions between good and bad and can even say with certainty which dead figures went to Heaven and which to Hell. It defends Kriemhild and accentuates her loyalty and love to Siegfried while denigrating others, especially Hagen. The Klage also repeatedly notes the possibilities that could have prevented the catastrophe that ends the Nibelungenlied. The poem also embeds the catastrophe within a larger genealogical context with the Netherlandish and Burgundian royal genealogies, which relativizes it as part of a longer history and is able to show continuity of rule for the kings except Etzel. The Klage even seems to make the events of the Nibelungenlied appear as though they had not just occurred in the narrative time of the poem, but rather in a distant historical past. The dead heroes appear almost to be giants, a common trait of German heroic poetry when the heroes are imagined to have lived in a distant past.

In contrast to the mostly positive portrayal of Etzel in the Nibelungenlied, the Klage reports that Etzel abandoned his Christianity, criticizes his exaggerated grief, and denies knowing what happened to the great king in the end. This could have been influenced by the negative traditions about Etzel (i.e. Attila the Hun) that circulated in chronicles. This corresponds to a general tendency of the poem to accentuate the differences between Christians and pagans more than its predecessor, as well as the placement of the poem into a clerical literary context in which the lack of "sources" about Etzel's fate makes a difference.

== The role of Dietrich von Bern ==
The main character of the Klage is the hero Dietrich von Bern, who had been introduced in the Nibelungenlied as an exile living at Etzel's court. Dietrich organizes the manner in which the characters of the Klage overcome the catastrophe of the last poem, seeing to it that the dead are buried and that survivors are informed. In contrast to the previous poem, Dietrich appears in complete control of the situation, with unfavorable elements like his hesitancy to enter combat and his tendency to lament in an exaggerated fashion reinterpreted as positive traits. The Klage contains several allusions to stories about Dietrich that can only have existed as an oral tradition at the time, such as his involuntary exile from Italy, Dietrich's close relationship with Etzel's first wife Helche, and Rüdiger's role in reconciling Dietrich with Helche, most likely after the death of Helche's sons while under Dietrich's care as reported in the later poem Rabenschlacht. Dietrich's return from exile only with Hildebrand, Herrat, and a mule closely resembles the account found in the Old Norse Thidreksaga, either because the compiler of the Thidrekssaga was aware of the Nibelungenklage or because both incorporate a similar orally transmitted story about Dietrich's return.

== Editions ==
- Lachmann, Karl, ed. (1826). Der Nibelunge not mit der klage : in der ältesten gestalt (1 ed.). Berlin: G. Reimer.
  - Lachmann, Karl, ed. (1841). Der Nibelunge noth und die klage : nach der ältesten überlieferung (2 ed.). Berlin: G. Reimer.
  - Lachmann, Karl, ed. (1851). Der Nibelunge noth und die klage : nach der ältesten überlieferung (3 ed.). Berlin: G. Reimer.
  - Lachmann, Karl, ed. (1867). Der Nibelunge noth und die klage : nach der ältesten überlieferung (4 (6th print of the text) ed.). Berlin: Georg Reimer. ISBN 9783111209432.
  - Lachmann, Karl, ed. (1877). Der Nibelunge noth und die klage : nach der ältesten überlieferung ((9th print of the text) ed.). Berlin: G. Reimer.
- Die Klage in der ältesten Gestalt mit den Veränderungen des gemeinen Textes. Als Anhang zum Nibelungenlied herausgegeben und mit einem Wörterbuch und einer Einleitung versehen von Adolf Holtzmann. Stuttgart 1859 (Google)
- Bartsch, Karl, ed. (1875). Die Klage: mit den Lesarten sämmtlicher Handschriften. Leipzig: Brockhaus.
- Bumke, Joachim, ed. (1999). Die "Nibelungenklage": synoptische Ausgabe aller vier Fassungen. Berlin/New York: de Gruyter. ISBN 3110163233.
- Lienert, Elisabeth, ed. (2000). Die Nibelungenklage: mittelhochdeutscher Text nach der Ausgabe von Karl Bartsch. Einführung, neuhochdeutsche Übersetzung und Kommentar. Paderborn: Schöningh. ISBN 3506785095. Text, translation, and commentary, based on the edition of Karl Bartsch.
- Kofler, Walter, ed. (2011). Nibelungenlied und Klage. Redaktion I. Stuttgart: Hirzel. ISBN 978-3-7776-2145-6. Manuscript I.
- Heinzle, Joachim, ed. (2013). Das Nibelungenlied und die Klage. Nach der Handschrift 857 der Stiftsbibliothek St. Gallen. Mittelhochdeutscher Text, Übersetzung und Kommentar. Berlin: Deutscher Klassiker Verlag. ISBN 978-3-618-66120-7. Text, translation and commentary, based on manuscript B.

== Translations into English ==
- William T. Whobrey, The Nibelungenlied: with The Klage, Edited and Translated, with an Introduction, by William T. Whobrey. Hackett Publishing Company 2018. ISBN 978-1-62466-675-9.
