= John Flood (Germanist) =

English literary scholar (1938–2021)

John Lewis Flood, FRHistS (22 September 1938 – 4 November 2021) was an English literary scholar, described as "one of the great figures of German Studies in the United Kingdom". A graduate of and later lecturer at the University of Nottingham, he was professor of German at the University of London from 1993 to 2002 and deputy director of the University of London Institute of Germanic Studies.

== Bibliography ==
- John L. Flood (ed.), Modern Swiss Literature: Unity and Diversity (London: St Martin's Press, 1985)
- John L. Flood (ed.), "Ein Moment Des Erfahrenen Lebens": Zur Lyrik der DDR, Beiträge zu einem Symposium (Amsterdam: Rodopi, 1987).
- John L. Flood and David N. Yeandle (eds), "Mit Regulu Bithuungan": Neue Arbeiten zur Althochdeutschen Poesie und Sprache (Göppingen: Kümmerle, 1989).
- John L. Flood (ed.), Kurz Bevor der Vorhang Fiel: Zum Theater der DDR (Amsterdam: Rodopi, 1990).
- John L. Flood (ed.), Common Currency?: Aspects of Anglo-German Literary Relations since 1945 (Stuttgart: Verlag Hans Dieter Heinz, 1991).
- John L. Flood (ed.), Die Historie von Herzog Ernst: Die Frankfurter Prosafassung des 16. Jahrhunderts (Berlin: Schmidt, 1992).
- John L. Flood and William Kelly (eds), The German Book, 1450–1750: Studies Presented to David L. Paisey in His Retirement (London: The British Library, 1995).
- John L. Flood and David J. Shaw, Johannes Sinapius (1505–1560): Hellenist and Physician in Germany and Italy, Travaux d'humanisme et Renaissance 311 (Geneva: Librairie Droz, 1997).
- Máire C. Davies, John L. Flood and David N. Yeandle (eds), "Proper Words in Proper Places": Studies in Lexicology and Lexicography in Honour of William Jervis Jones., (Stuttgart: Verlag Hans-Dieter Heinz, 2001).
- John L. Flood, Poets Laureate in the Holy Roman Empire: A Bio-Bibliographical Handbook, 4 vols (Berlin: De Gruyter, 2006).
- John L. Flood and Anne Simon, Glanz und Abglanz: Two Centuries of German studies in the University of London (London: Institute of Modern Languages Research, 2017).
