= Karl Bartsch =

German medievalist (1832–1888)

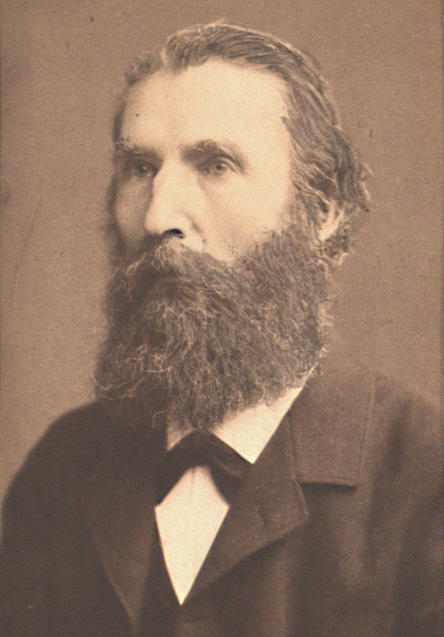
- Born: 25 February 1832; Sprottau, Kingdom of Prussia (now Szprotawa, Poland)
- Died: 19 February 1888 (aged 55); Heidelberg, German Empire
- Known for: Bartsch's law

Academic background
- Education: University of Halle

Academic work
- Discipline: Medieval Germanic and Romance linguistics
- Sub-discipline: Middle High German and Old French
- Institutions: German National Museum; University of Rostock; University of Heidelberg
- Doctoral students: Otto Behaghel

Karl Friedrich Adolf Konrad Bartsch (25 February 1832, in Sprottau – 19 February 1888, in Heidelberg) was a German philologist and medievalist.

He studied philology at the universities of Breslau (from 1848) and Berlin (1851/52), where he was a pupil of Wilhelm Grimm. In 1853 he received his doctorate from the University of Halle, and in 1855 began work as caretaker at the German National Museum in Nuremberg. In 1858, he was appointed professor of German and Romance philology at the University of Rostock, where he founded the first seminar for German philology. In 1871 he succeeded Adolf Holtzmann at the University of Heidelberg, where he taught till his death, shortly before what would have been his fifty-sixth birthday.

== Publications ==
- Provenzalisches Lesebuch: Mit einer literarischen Einleitung und einem Wörterbuche, 1855 – Provençal reading book: with a literary introduction and a dictionary.
- Denkmäler der provenzalischen Litteratur, 1856 Monuments of Provençal literature.
- Peire Vidal’s Lieder (as editor, 1857) Peire Vidal's songs.
- Mittelhochdeutsche Gedichte, 1860 – Middle High German poems.
- Chrestomathie de l'ancien français (1866; 10th edition, 1910) Chrestomathy of Old French.
- Das Nibelungenlied (as editor, 1866).
- Die deutsche Treue in Sage und Poesie, 1867 – German loyalty in legend and poetry.
- Der saturnische Vers und die altdeutsche Langzeile, 1867 - Saturnian verse and the old German langzeile.
- Chrestomathie provençale (2nd edition, 1868) - Provençal chrestomathy.
- Herzog Ernst, 1869 – Herzog Ernst, a German epic.
- Grundriss zur Geschichte der provenzalischen Literatur, 1872 - Outline of the history of Provençal literature.
- Dante Allighieri's Göttliche Komödie: 1: Die Hölle 2. Das Fegefeuer 3. Das Paradies
- Sagen, Märchen und Gebräuche aus Meklenburg (2 volumes, 1879–80) - Tales, legends and customs of Mecklenburg.
- Gesammelte Vorträge und Aufsätze, 1883 - Collected lectures and essays.

He was the author of many biographies in the Allgemeine Deutsche Biographie.
